= Edward C. T. Chao =

Chinese geologist (1919–2008)

Edward C.T. Chao
- Born: November 30, 1919; Suzhou, China
- Died: February 3, 2008 (aged 88); Fairfax, Virginia
- Education: University of Chicago
- Known for: impact metamorphism
- Awards: Barringer Medal (1992)
- Scientific career
- Fields: Geology
- Workplaces: U.S. Geological Survey

Edward Ching-Te Chao (趙景德; November 30, 1919 – February 3, 2008) was one of the founders of the field of impact metamorphism, the study of the effects of meteorite impacts on the Earth's crust.

Born in Suzhou, China, he was best known for discovering two high-pressure forms of silica in nature: coesite and stishovite.

== Early life ==
Chao was born in Suzhou, China. He was the son of theologian T. C. Chao. He was the grandfather of Johanna Chao Kreilick.

== Career ==
Chao came to the United States in 1945 to teach Chinese to American troops. He then attended the University of Chicago and was granted a PhD in geology in 1948. In 1949, he was employed by the United States Geological Survey (USGS), where he spent his entire professional career until retiring in 1994.

== Scientific contributions ==
Chao worked on a variety of topics over the course of his USGS career, including engineering geology, economic geology, and coal petrology. However, he was best known for his work on impact geology and tektites. Shortly after he began work on tektites in 1960, Chao was given a sample of sandstone from the vicinity of Meteor Crater, Arizona. From this material, he was able to isolate an unusual mineral with high refractive index, which he showed to be a high-pressure polymorph of silicon dioxide. He named the new mineral coesite in honor of the scientist who had synthesized the same phase in the laboratory seven years earlier. Several years later, Chao found a second high-pressure polymorph of silica in these rocks. It, too, had been previously synthesized in laboratory studies, but was not known to occur in nature. He named this mineral stishovite in honor of the person who had first made it, Russian physicist, Sergei Stishov. Coesite and stishovite became known as hallmarks of impact crater events, which were essentially the only natural processes that produced high enough pressures to transform ordinary quartz into both of these dense minerals. Chao went on to find coesite and stishovite in rocks from the Ries Crater in Bavaria, Germany, establishing that this structure was also produced by impact cratering.

Chao made many pioneering studies on tektites, and discovered the occurrence of iron-nickel metal in specimens from the Philippines. This helped establish that tektites were produced in meteorite impacts. He also recognized that tektites showed evidence for passage through Earth's atmosphere, which led him to the conclusion that the impacts responsible for tektites occurred on the Moon, a view that is no longer widely held among scientists.

His work on Moon rocks included being a member of preliminary examination teams and a principal investigator during the Apollo 11-17 research programs.

== Publications ==
- Comparative water-quality assessment of the Hai He River basin in the People's Republic of China and three similar basins in the United States U.S. Geological Survey Professional Paper No. 1647 (2001)
- Comparison of the Cretaceous-Tertiary boundary impact events and the 0.77-Ma Australasian tektite event; relevance to mass extinction U.S. Geological Survey Bulletin No. 2050 (1993)
- Allocation of subsamples of Apollo 17 lunar rocks from the boulder at station 7, for study by the International Consortium U.S. Geological Survey Open-File Report No. 78-511 (1978)
- Merumite; a complex assemblage of chromium minerals from Guyana U.S. Geological Survey Professional Paper No. 887 (1976)

== Honors ==
Chao received the John Price Wetherill Medal from the Franklin Institute and, in 1992, the Barringer Medal from the Meteoritical Society for his work in impact geology. He was a recipient of the Alexander von Humboldt Foundation Senior U.S. Scientist Award, and had an asteroid named for him, 3906 Chao. The mineral chaoite, an impact-produced form of carbon discovered at the Ries Crater, was also named in his honor.
