= Seifertite =

Dense silica mineral

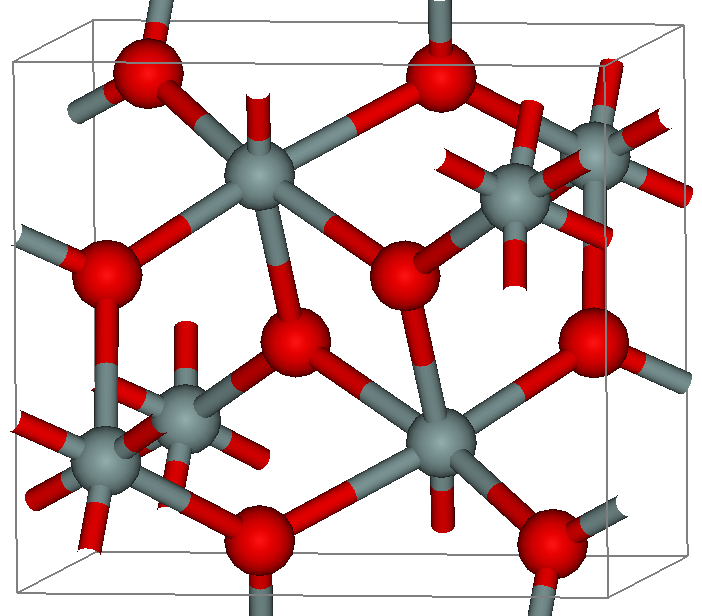
- Crystal structure

General
- Category: Tectosilicate minerals
- Group: Quartz group
- Formula: SiO_{2}
- IMA symbol: Sft
- Strunz classification: 4.DA.05 (oxides)
- Dana classification: 75.01.06 (tectosilicates)
- Crystal system: Orthorhombic (Pbcn)
- Crystal class: Dipyramidal (mmm); H–M symbol: (2/m 2/m 2/m)

Identification
- Formula mass: 60.08 g/mol
- Crystal habit: Microscopic crystals
- Specific gravity: 4.294

Seifertite is a silicate mineral with the formula SiO_{2} and is one of the densest polymorphs of silica. It has only been found in Martian and lunar meteorites, where it is presumably formed from either tridymite or cristobalite – other polymorphs of quartz – as a result of heating during the atmospheric entry and impact to the Earth, at an estimated minimal pressure of 35 GPa. It can also be produced in the laboratory by compressing cristobalite in a diamond anvil cell to pressures above 40 GPa. The mineral is named after Friedrich Seifert (born 1941), the founder of the Bayerisches Geoinstitut at University of Bayreuth, Germany, and is officially recognized by the International Mineralogical Association.

Seifertite forms micrometre-sized crystalline lamellae embedded into a glassy SiO_{2} matrix. The lamellae are rather difficult to analyze, as they vitrify within seconds under laser or electron beams used for standard Raman spectroscopy or electron-beam microanalysis, even at much reduced beam intensities. Nevertheless, it was possible to verify that it is mainly composed of SiO_{2} with minor inclusions of Na_{2}O (0.40 wt.%) and Al_{2}O_{3} (1.14 wt.%). X-ray diffraction reveals that the mineral has scrutinyite (α-PbO_{2}) type structure with an orthorhombic symmetry and Pbcn or Pb2n space group. Its lattice constants a = 4.097, b = 5.0462, c = 4.4946, Z = 4 correspond to the density of 4.294 g/cm^{3}, which is among the highest for any forms of silica (for example, the density of quartz is 2.65 g/cm^{3}). Only stishovite has a comparable density of about 4.287 g/cm^{3}.

Kubo et al. found Seifertite thermodynamically stable at more than ~100 GPa, and metastable with pressures as low as ~11 GPa, given critical shock duration of at least 0.01 seconds, and an impactor greater than approximately 50 meters in size.

== See also ==
- Coesite
- Moganite
