= Tridymite =

Silica mineral, polymorph of quartz

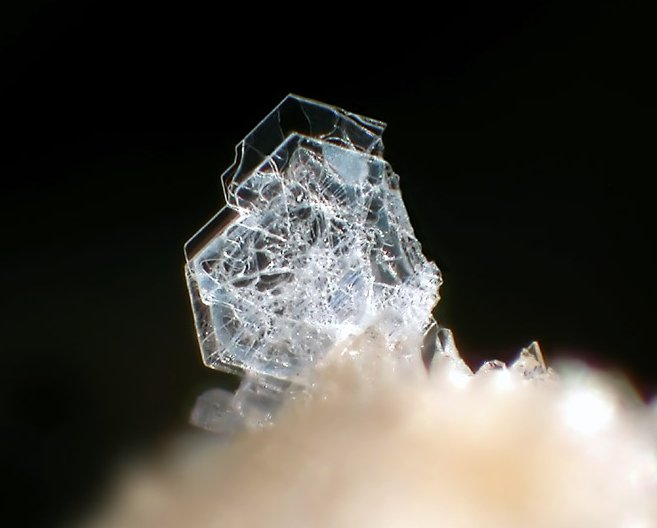
- Tabular tridymite crystals from Ochtendung, Eifel, Germany

General
- Category: Tectosilicate minerals
- Group: Quartz group
- Formula: SiO_{2}
- IMA symbol: Trd
- Strunz classification: 4.DA.10
- Crystal system: Orthorhombic (α-tridymite)
- Crystal class: Disphenoidal (222); H–M symbol: (222)
- Space group: C222_{1}

Identification
- Formula mass: 60.08 g/mol
- Color: Colorless, white, gray.
- Crystal habit: Platy – sheet forms
- Cleavage: {0001} indistinct, {1010} imperfect
- Fracture: Brittle – conchoidal
- Mohs scale hardness: 7
- Luster: Vitreous
- Streak: white
- Specific gravity: 2.25–2.28
- Optical properties: Biaxial (+), 2V = 40–86°, Optical Orientation is X=b, Y=a, Z=c. Relief in the thin section is moderate negative.
- Refractive index: n_{α}=1.468–1.482 n_{β}=1.470–1.484 n_{γ}=1.474–1.486
- Birefringence: δ < 0.004
- Pleochroism: Colorless
- 2V angle: 2Vz=40-90°
- Alters to: At room temperature, is a pseudomorph or paramorph.
- Other characteristics: non-radioactive, non-magnetic; fluorescent, short UV=dark red

Tridymite is a high-temperature polymorph of silica and usually occurs as minute tabular white or colorless pseudo-hexagonal crystals, or scales, in cavities in felsic volcanic rocks. Its chemical formula is SiO_{2}. Tridymite was first described in 1868 and the type location is in Hidalgo, Mexico. The name is from the Greek tridymos for triplet as tridymite commonly occurs as twinned crystal trillings (compound crystals comprising three twinned crystal components).

== Structure ==
Crystal structure of α-tridymite

β-tridymite

Tridymite can occur in seven crystalline forms. Two of the most common at standard pressure are known as α and β. The α-tridymite phase is favored at elevated temperatures (above 870 °C) and it converts to β-cristobalite at 1,470 °C. However, tridymite does not usually form from pure β-quartz, one needs to add trace amounts of certain compounds to achieve this. Otherwise the β-quartz-tridymite transition is skipped and β-quartz transitions directly to cristobalite at 1,050 °C without occurrence of the tridymite phase.

High-temperature β-tridymite has a hexagonal structure. But cooling alters its hexagonal property.

Crystal phases of tridymite
Name	Symmetry	Space group	Temp. (°C)
HP (β)	Hexagonal	P6_{3}/mmc	460
LHP	Hexagonal	P6_{3}22	400
OC (α)	Orthorhombic	C222_{1}	220
OS	Orthorhombic		100–200
OP	Orthorhombic	P2_{1}2_{1}2_{1}	155
MC	Monoclinic	Cc	22
MX	Monoclinic	C1	22

In the table, M, O, H, C, P, L and S stand for monoclinic, orthorhombic, hexagonal, centered, primitive, low (temperature) and superlattice. T indicates the temperature, at which the corresponding phase is relatively stable, though the interconversions between phases are complex and sample dependent, and all these forms can coexist at ambient conditions. Mineralogy handbooks often arbitrarily assign tridymite to the triclinic crystal system, yet use hexagonal Miller indices because of the hexagonal crystal shape (see image).

== Distinguishing Features ==
Tridymite can be indistinguishable from a quartz pseudo-morph when using hand samples.

=== Distinguishing from Quartz ===
Tridymite has low indices of refraction and a low birefrigence. These characteristics can be used to distinguish it from quartz.

== Occurrence ==
Tridymite occurs in felsic, intermediate extrusive, and shallow intrusive igneous rocks. It's also observed in stony meteorites and basaltic lavas.

P-T Diagram for SiO_{2}

== Mars ==
In December 2015, the team behind NASA's Mars Science Laboratory announced the discovery of large amounts of tridymite in Marias Pass on the slope of Aeolis Mons, popularly known as Mount Sharp, on the planet Mars. This discovery was unexpected given the rarity of the mineral on Earth and the apparent lack of volcanic activity where it was discovered, and at the time of discovery no explanation for how it was formed was forthcoming. Its discovery was serendipitous: two teams, responsible for two different instruments on the Curiosity rover, both happened to report what in isolation were relatively uninteresting findings related to their instruments: the ChemCam team reported a region of high silica while the DAN team reported high neutron readings in what turned out to be the same area. Neither team would have been aware of the other's findings had it not been for a fortuitous Mars conjunction in July 2015, during which the various international teams took advantage of the downtime to meet in Paris and discuss their scientific findings.

DAN's high neutron readings would normally have been interpreted as meaning the region was hydrogen-rich, and ChemCam's high-silica readings were not surprising given the ubiquity of silica-rich deposits on Mars, but taken together it was clear that further study of the region was needed. Following conjunction, NASA directed the Curiosity rover back to the area where the readings had been taken and discovered that large amounts of tridymite were present. How they were formed was unknown, as of December 2015.

== See also ==
- Cristobalite
- Coesite
- Stishovite
