= Meteor Crater =

Meteorite impact crater in northern Arizona

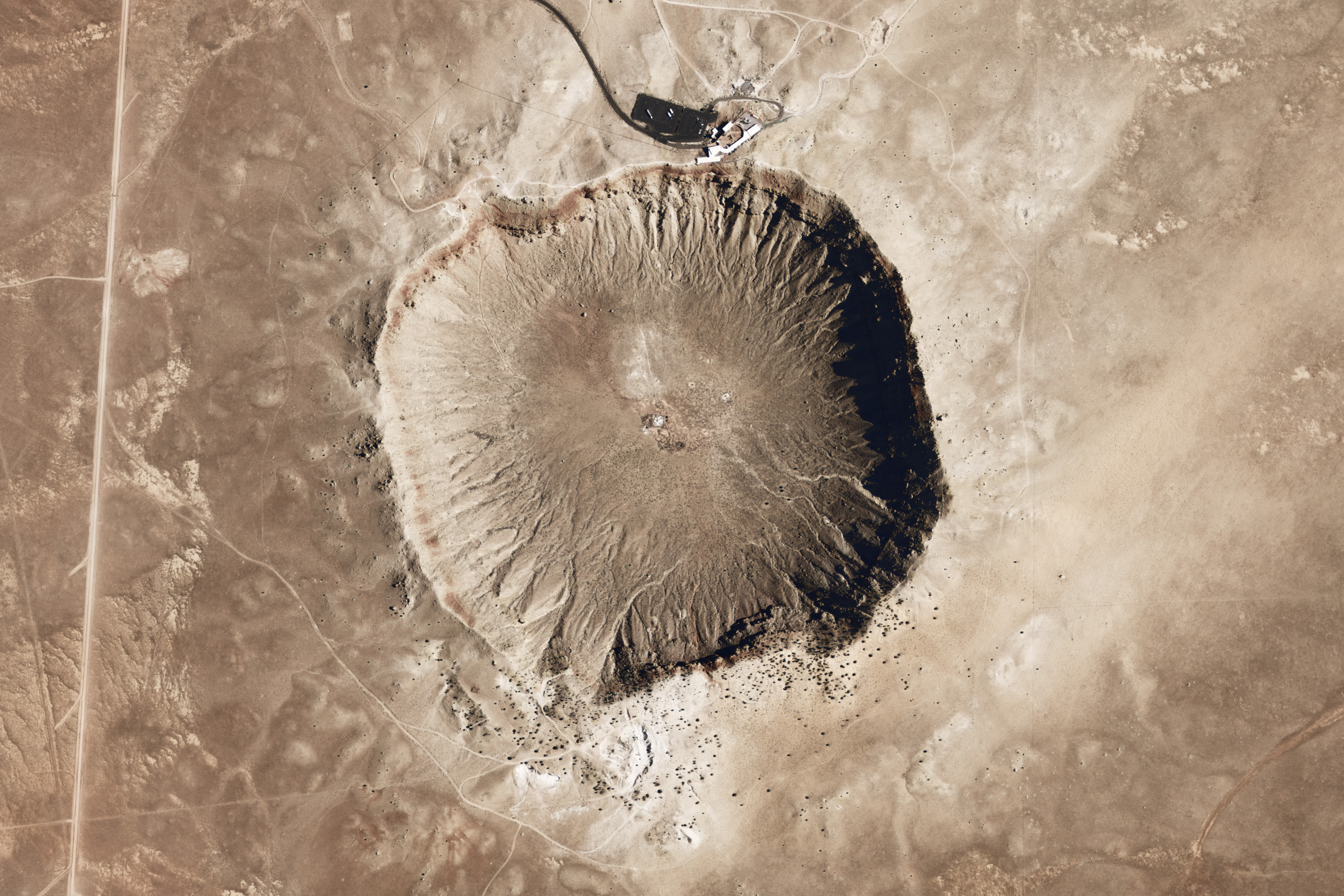
- Meteor Crater

- Location within Arizona
- Location: Coconino County, Arizona, United States; 35°01′41″N 111°01′24″W

Impact crater structure
- Confidence: Confirmed
- Diameter: 0.737 miles (1.186 km)
- Depth: 560 feet (170 m)
- Rise: 148 feet (45 m)
- Impactor diameter: 160 feet (50 m)
- Age: 50,000 years
- Exposed: Yes
- Drilled: Yes
- Bolide type: Iron meteorite
- Access: Interstate 40

U.S. National Natural Landmark
- Designated: November 1967

Meteor Crater, or Barringer Crater, is an impact crater about 37 mi (60 km) east of Flagstaff and 18 mi (29 km) west of Winslow in the desert of northern Arizona, United States. The site had several earlier names, and fragments of the meteorite are officially called the Canyon Diablo Meteorite, after the adjacent Canyon Diablo.

Meteor Crater lies at an elevation of 5,640 ft (1,719 m) above sea level. It is about 3,900 ft (1,200 m) in diameter, some 560 ft (170 m) deep, and is surrounded by a rim that rises 148 ft (45 m) above the surrounding plains. The center of the crater is filled with 690–790 ft (210–240 m) of rubble lying above crater bedrock. One of the features of the crater is its squared-off outline, believed to be caused by existing regional jointing (cracks) in the strata at the impact site.

Despite an attempt to make the crater a public landmark, the crater remains privately owned by the Barringer family to the present day through their Barringer Crater Company. The Lunar and Planetary Institute, the American Museum of Natural History, and other science institutes proclaim it to be the "best-preserved meteorite crater on Earth". It was designated a National Natural Landmark in November 1967.

== Formation ==
Comparison of approximate sizes of notable impactors with the Hoba meteorite and a Boeing 747.

The crater was created about 50,000 years ago during the Pleistocene epoch, when the local climate on the Colorado Plateau was much cooler and damper. The area was an open grassland dotted with woodlands inhabited by mammoths and giant ground sloths.

The object that excavated the crater was a nickel-iron meteorite about 160 ft (50 m) across. The speed of the impact has been a subject of some debate. Modeling initially suggested that the meteorite struck at up to 45,000 mph (20 km/s), but more recent research suggests the impact was substantially slower, at 29,000 mph (12.8 km/s). About half of the impactor's bulk is believed to have been vaporized during its descent through the atmosphere. Impact energy has been estimated at 10 megatons TNT_{e}. The meteorite was mostly vaporized upon impact, leaving few remains in the crater.

Since the crater's formation, the rim is thought to have lost 50–65 ft (15–20 m) of height at the rim crest as a result of natural erosion. Similarly, the basin of the crater is thought to have roughly 100 ft (30 m) of additional postimpact sedimentation from lake sediments and alluvium. Very few remaining craters are visible on Earth, since many have been erased by erosive geological processes. The relatively young age of Meteor Crater, paired with the dry Arizona climate, has allowed this crater to remain comparatively unchanged since its formation. The lack of erosion that preserved the crater's shape greatly accelerated its groundbreaking recognition as an impact crater from a natural celestial body.

== Discovery and investigation ==
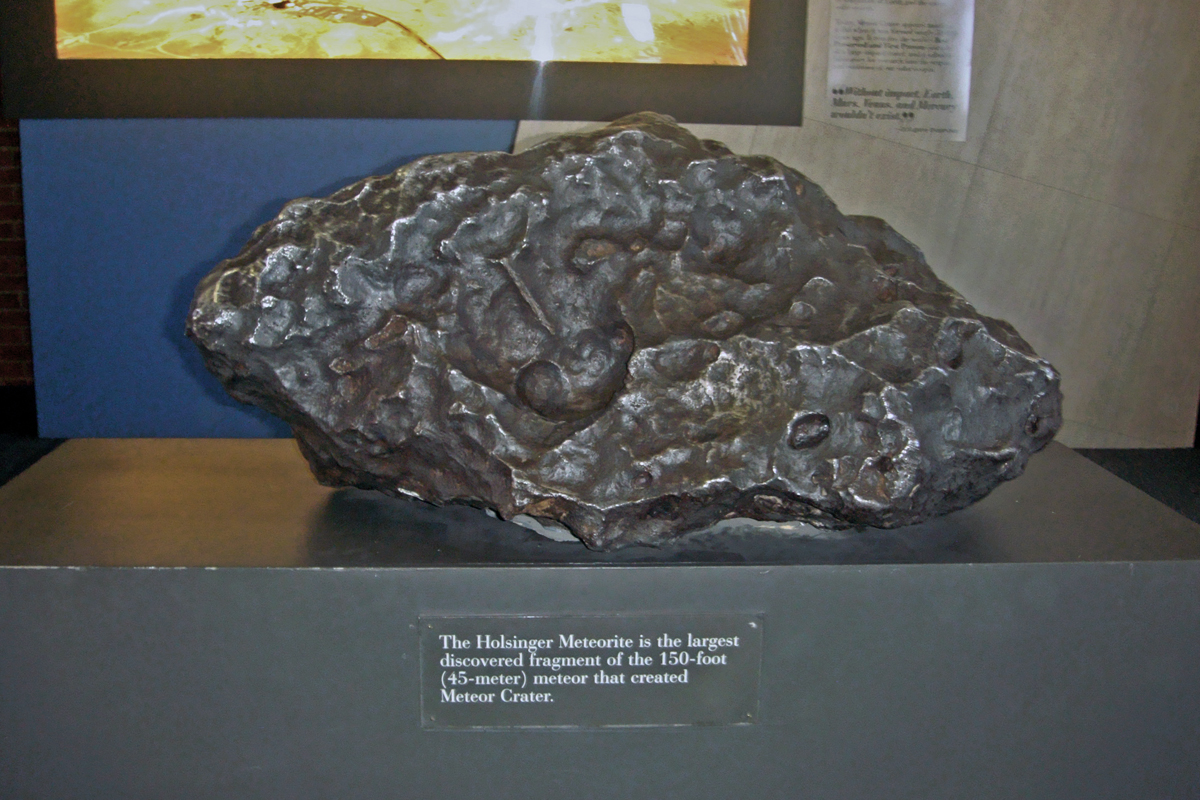
The Holsinger fragment, at roughly 2.6 ft (0.8 m) across, is the largest discovered piece of the meteorite that created Meteor Crater, and it is exhibited in the crater visitor center.

Meteor Crater came to the attention of scientists after American settlers encountered it in the 19th century. The crater was given several early names, including "Coon Mountain", "Coon Butte", "Crater Mountain", "Meteor Mountain," and "Meteor Crater." Daniel M. Barringer was one of the first people to suggest that the crater was produced by a meteorite impact, with the Barringer family filing mining claims and purchasing it and its surroundings in the early 20th century. This led to the crater also being known as "Barringer Crater." Meteorites from the area are called Canyon Diablo meteorites, after the convention of naming the meteorite after the closest post office, which was Canyon Diablo, Arizona. The canyon itself passes 2.5 miles (4.0 km) to the west and crosses the strewn field, where meteorites from the crater-forming event are found. The crater was initially assumed to have been formed by a volcanic steam explosion; evidence of geologically recent volcanic activity occurs across this part of Arizona – the southeastern edge of the San Francisco volcanic field is only about 20 mi (32 km) northwest of Meteor Crater.

=== Albert E. Foote ===
In 1891, mineralogist Albert E. Foote presented the first scientific paper about the meteorites of Northern Arizona. Several years earlier, Foote had received an iron rock for analysis from a railroad executive. Foote immediately recognized the rock as a meteorite and led an expedition to search and retrieve additional meteorite samples. The team collected samples ranging from small fragments to over 600 lb (270 kg). Foote identified several minerals in the meteorites, including microscopic diamonds. His paper to the Association for the Advancement of Science provided the first geological description of Meteor Crater to a scientific community.

=== Grove Karl Gilbert ===
In November 1891, Grove Karl Gilbert, chief geologist for the US Geological Survey, investigated the crater and concluded that it was the result of a volcanic steam explosion. Gilbert assumed that, if it were an impact crater, then the volume of the crater, as well as meteoritic material, should still be present in the crater's rim. Gilbert also assumed a large portion of the meteorite should be buried in the crater and that this should generate a large magnetic anomaly. Gilbert's calculations showed that the volume of the crater and the debris on the rim were roughly equivalent, which meant that the mass of the hypothetical impactor was missing. There were also no detectable magnetic anomalies; he argued that the meteorite fragments found on the rim were coincidental or placed there. Gilbert publicized his conclusions in a series of lectures. In 1892, Gilbert would be among the first scientists to propose that the Moon's craters were caused by impact rather than volcanism.

=== Daniel M. Barringer ===
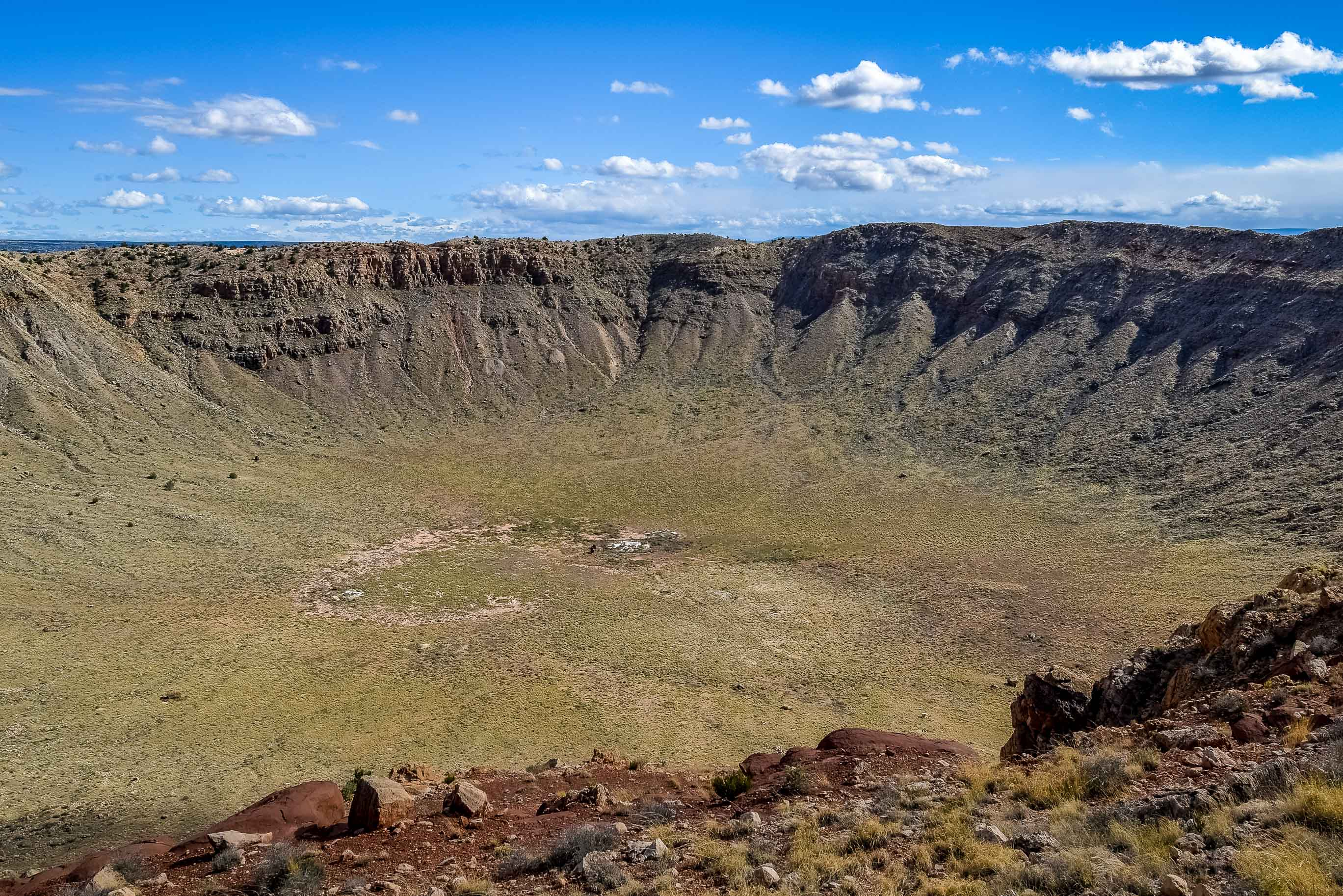
Looking into the crater from the north rim: The rust-colored area on the far (south) rim is where the last drilling for the meteorite occurred, in 1929. This is where Daniel M. Barringer believed the bulk of the meteorite was buried. Rock around the south rim is visibly uplifted.

Mining engineer and businessman Daniel M. Barringer suspected that the crater had been produced by the impact of a large iron meteorite. The theory that the crater was of meteoric origin had been met with skepticism. At the time, the craters visible on the Moon were thought to be volcanic, and no one had conclusively proved that impact craters existed.

Barringer had amassed a small fortune as an investor in the successful Commonwealth Mine in Pearce, Cochise County, Arizona. Barringer believed that the bulk of the Meteor Crater impactor could still be found under the crater floor. Impact physics was poorly understood at the time, and Barringer was unaware that most of the meteorite had vaporized on impact. Barringer incorporated a company, the Standard Iron Company, and staked a mining claim on the land, hoping to mine the asteroid that had produced the crater. He estimated from the size of the crater that the meteorite had a mass of 10 million tons.

The metal content of the iron meteorites found around the crater was valued at the time at US$125/ton, so Barringer was searching for a lode he believed to be worth more than a billion 1903 dollars. "By 1928, Barringer had sunk the majority of his fortune into the crater – $500,000, or roughly $9 million in 2025 dollars."

Barringer spent 27 years trying to locate the nonexistent deposit of meteoric iron, and drilled to a depth of 1,375 ft (419 m), but no significant deposit was ever found.

Barringer was politically well-connected. He received a land patent signed by Theodore Roosevelt for 640 acres (1 sq mi, 260 ha) around the center of the crater in 1903. In 1906, at his request, President Roosevelt also authorized the establishment of a post office unconventionally named "Meteor", located at Sunshine, a stop on the Atchison, Topeka and Santa Fe Railway, 6 miles (9.7 km) north of the crater. The Meteor post office closed on April 15, 1912, due to disuse.

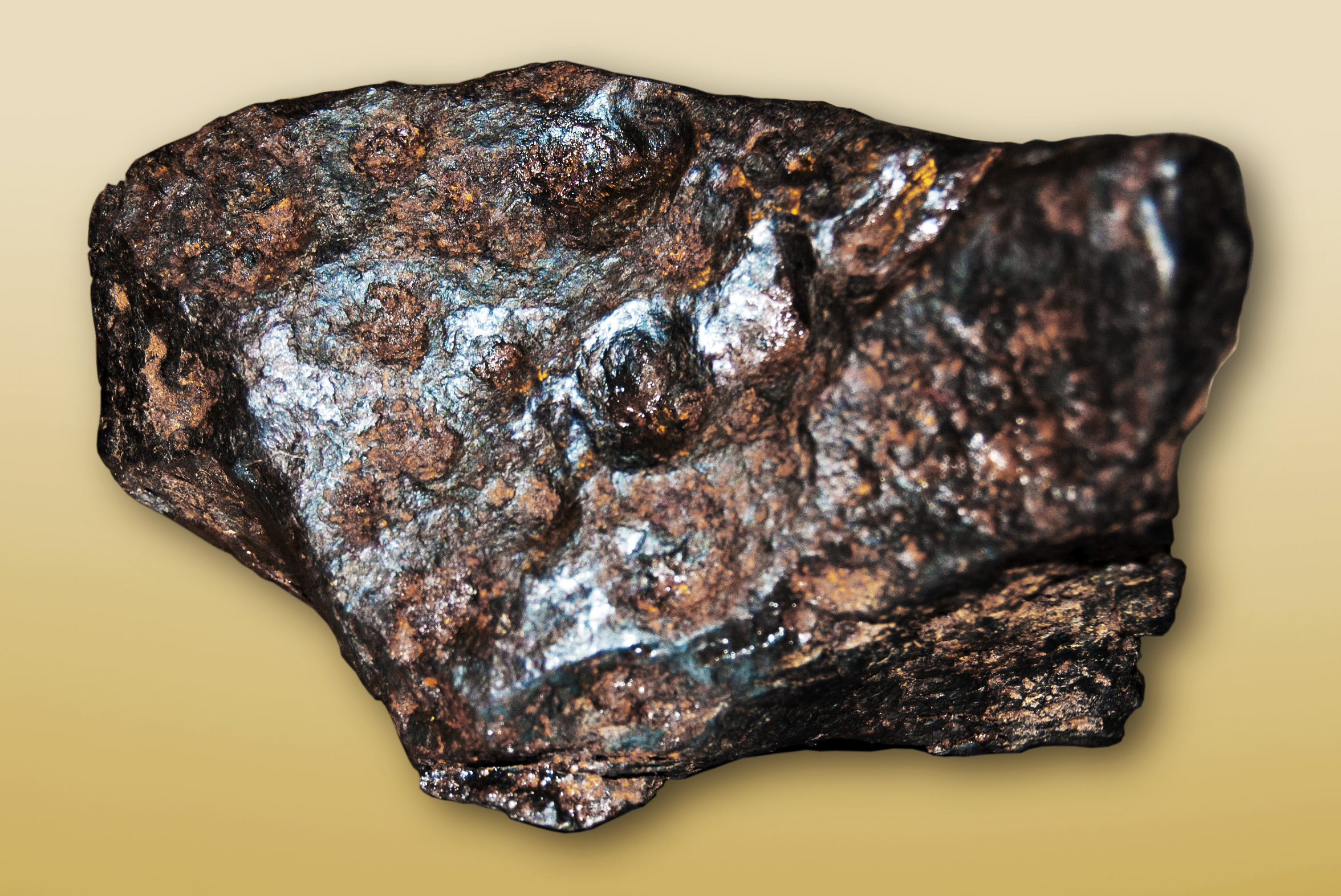
Fragment of the Canyon Diablo meteorite

In 1929, astronomer F. R. Moulton was employed by the Barringer Crater Company to investigate the physics of the impact event. Moulton concluded that the impactor likely weighed as little as 300,000 tonnes, and that the impact of such a body would have generated enough heat to vaporize the impactor instantly. Barringer died just ten days after the publication of Moulton's second report.

By this time, "the great weight of scientific opinion had swung around to the accuracy of the impact hypothesis ... Apparently an idea, too radical and new for acceptance in 1905, no matter how logical, had gradually grown respectable during the intervening 20 years."

=== Harvey H. Nininger ===
Harvey Harlow Nininger was an American meteoriticist and educator, and he initiated a widespread interest in the scientific study of meteorites in the 1930s, and assembled the largest personal collection of meteorites up to that time. While based in Denver, Colorado, Nininger published the first edition of a pamphlet titled "A Comet Strikes the Earth", which described how Meteor Crater formed when an asteroid impacted the Earth. In 1942, Nininger moved his home and business from Denver to the Meteor Crater Observatory, located near the turn-off for Meteor Crater on Route 66. He christened the building the "American Meteorite Museum" and published a number of meteorite and Meteor Crater-related books from the location. He also conducted a wide range of research at the crater, discovering impactite, iron-nickel spherules related to the impact and vaporization of the asteroid, and the presence of many other features, such as half-melted slugs of meteoric iron mixed with melted target rock. Nininger's discoveries were compiled and published in a seminal work, Arizona's Meteorite Crater (1956). Nininger's extensive sampling and fieldwork in the 1930s and 40s contributed significantly to the scientific community's acceptance of the idea that Meteor Crater formed by the impact of an asteroid. Many of his discoveries were later observed at other relatively fresh impact craters, including Henbury and Monturaqui.

Nininger believed that the crater should be a national monument and, in 1948, he successfully petitioned the American Astronomical Society to pass a motion in support of nationalizing the crater by making "the unauthorized—and false—claim that the [Barringers] would be receptive to a fair purchase for the crater." By this time, mining activity at the crater had ceased, and the Barringers were in the process of planning a tourist attraction on the rim of the crater. Nininger was operating the American Meteorite Museum nearby, on Route 66, at the time. Nininger hoped that a public museum could be built on the crater's rim, and that the project might lead to the founding of a federal institute of meteorite research. Offended by Nininger's attempt to nationalize the crater, the Barringer family promptly terminated his exploration rights and ability to conduct further fieldwork at the crater. A few years later, in 1953, the Standard Iron Company was renamed the "Barringer Crater Company," and a private museum was constructed on the crater rim.

=== Eugene M. Shoemaker ===
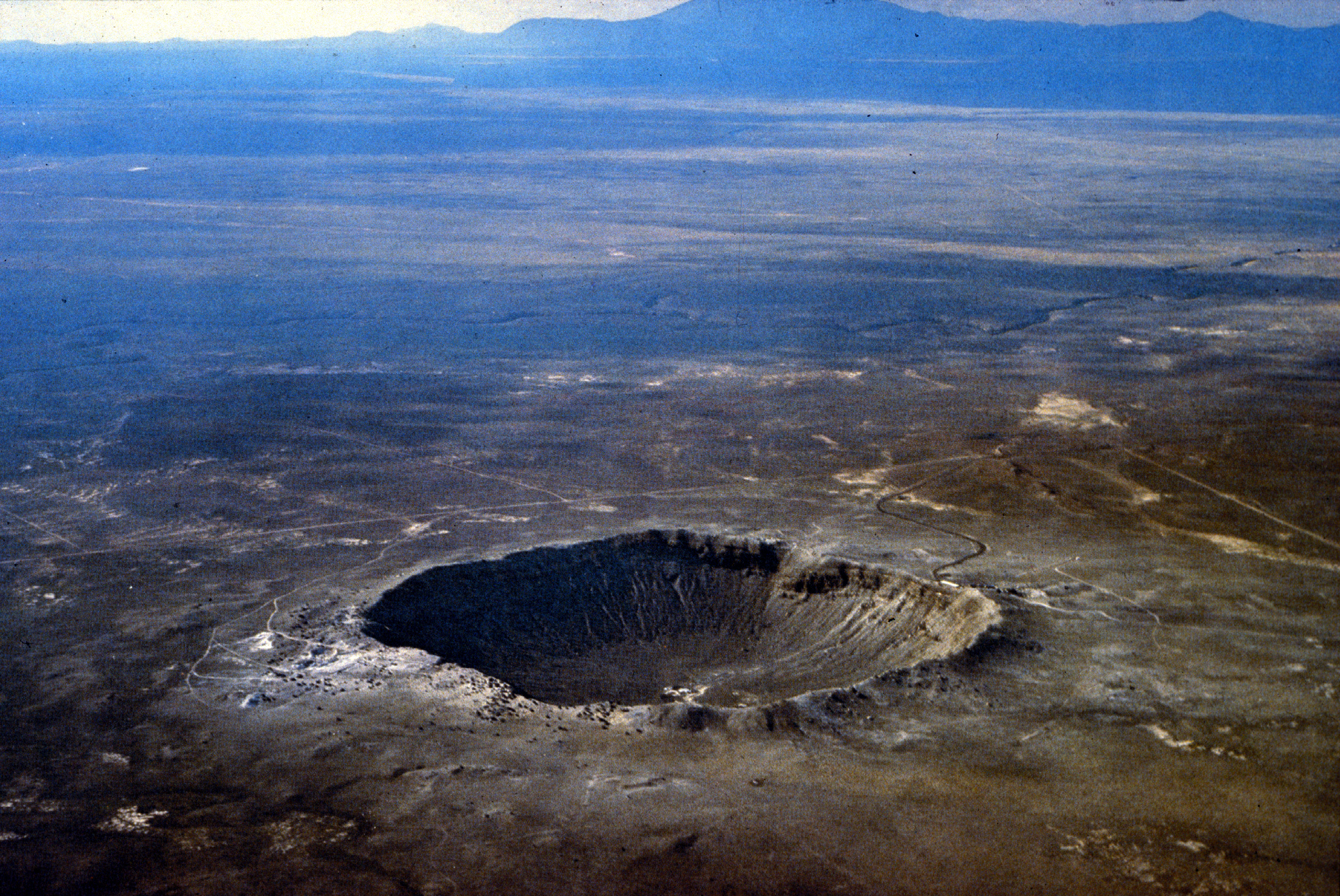
Meteor Crater from the southeast; the uplift around the rim can be seen

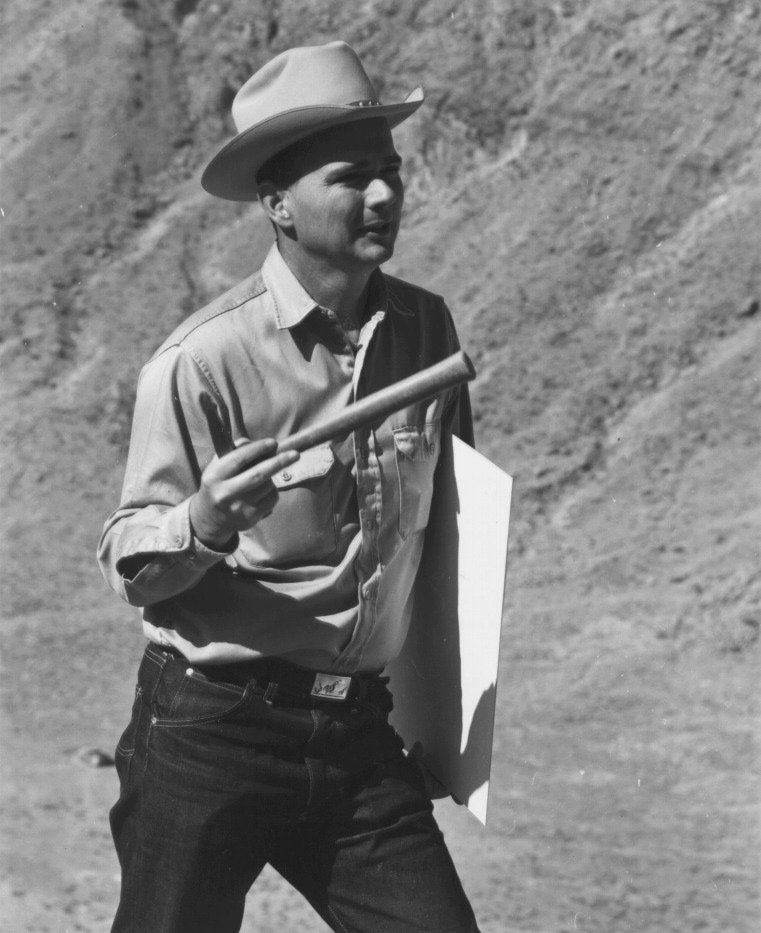

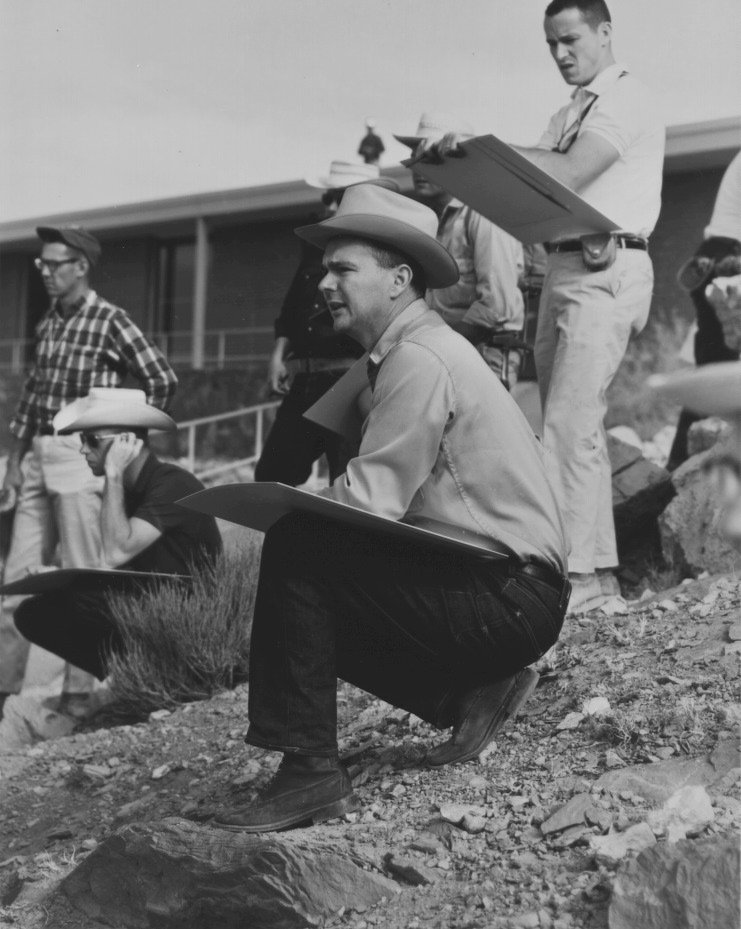
Photos of Shoemaker at Meteor Crater teaching Apollo astronauts

Eugene Merle Shoemaker continued investigations at the crater. A key discovery was the presence in the crater of the minerals coesite and stishovite, rare forms of silica found only where quartz-bearing rocks have been severely shocked by an instantaneous overpressure. Shocked quartz cannot be created by volcanic action; the only known mechanisms of creating it are naturally through lightning or an impact event, or artificially, through a nuclear explosion. In 1960, Edward C. T. Chao and Shoemaker identified coesite at Meteor Crater, adding to the growing body of evidence that the crater was formed from an impact generating extremely high temperatures and pressures. He confirmed what F.R. Moulton and H.H. Nininger already proposed: the impact vaporized the vast majority of the impactor. The pieces of Canyon Diablo meteorite found scattered around the site broke away from the main body before and during the impact. Shoemaker published his conclusions in his 1974 book, the Guidebook to the geology of Meteor Crater, Arizona.

Geologists used the nuclear detonation that created the Sedan crater, and other such craters from the era of atmospheric nuclear testing, to establish upper and lower limits on the kinetic energy of the impactor.

== Geology ==
The impact created an inverted stratigraphy, so that the layers immediately exterior to the rim are stacked in the reverse order to which they normally occur; the impact overturned and inverted the layers to a distance of 1–2 km outward from the crater's edge. Specifically, climbing the rim of the crater from outside, one finds:

- Coconino Sandstone (sandstone formed 265 million years ago) nearest the top of the rim
- Toroweap Formation (limestone formed 255 million years ago)
- Kaibab Formation (dolostone formed 250 million years ago)
- Moenkopi Formation (mudstone formed 245 million years ago) nearest the outer foot of the rim

Soils around the crater are brown, slightly to moderately alkaline, gravelly or stony loam of the Winona series; on the crater rim and in the crater itself, the Winona is mapped in a complex association with rock outcrop.

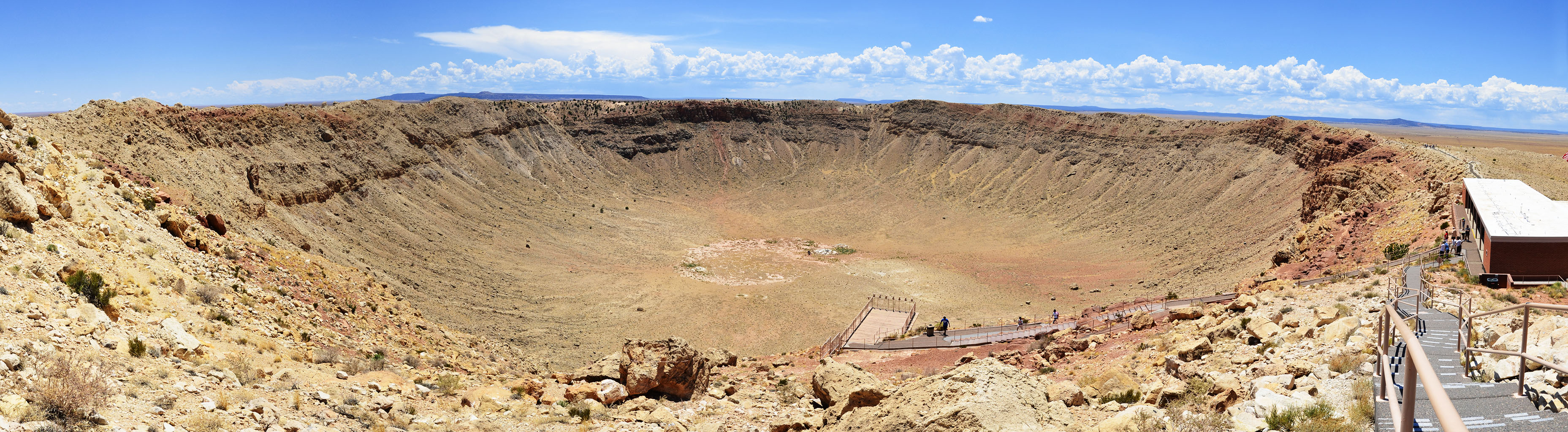
Panoramic view from upper deck

== Climate ==
Climate data for Meteor Crater, Arizona (5535ft or 1687m), 1991–2020 normals
Month	Jan	Feb	Mar	Apr	May	Jun	Jul	Aug	Sep	Oct	Nov	Dec	Year
Mean daily maximum °F (°C)	47.2 (8.4)	53.1 (11.7)	61.7 (16.5)	68.4 (20.2)	76.7 (24.8)	88.3 (31.3)	90.8 (32.7)	88.0 (31.1)	81.7 (27.6)	70.2 (21.2)	56.8 (13.8)	46.8 (8.2)	69.1 (20.6)
Daily mean °F (°C)	36.2 (2.3)	40.6 (4.8)	47.7 (8.7)	54.1 (12.3)	61.3 (16.3)	72.3 (22.4)	76.0 (24.4)	74.4 (23.6)	68.4 (20.2)	56.7 (13.7)	44.2 (6.8)	35.1 (1.7)	55.6 (13.1)
Mean daily minimum °F (°C)	25.1 (−3.8)	28.1 (−2.2)	33.7 (0.9)	39.7 (4.3)	45.9 (7.7)	56.2 (13.4)	61.2 (16.2)	60.7 (15.9)	55.0 (12.8)	43.1 (6.2)	31.6 (−0.2)	23.4 (−4.8)	42.0 (5.5)
Average precipitation inches (mm)	1.13 (29)	1.02 (26)	0.49 (12)	0.69 (18)	0.49 (12)	0.29 (7.4)	1.88 (48)	2.39 (61)	1.65 (42)	0.95 (24)	0.68 (17)	0.64 (16)	12.3 (312.4)
Source: NOAA

== Recent history ==
During the 1960s and 1970s, NASA astronauts trained in the crater to prepare for the Apollo missions to the Moon, and ongoing field training for astronauts continues to this day.

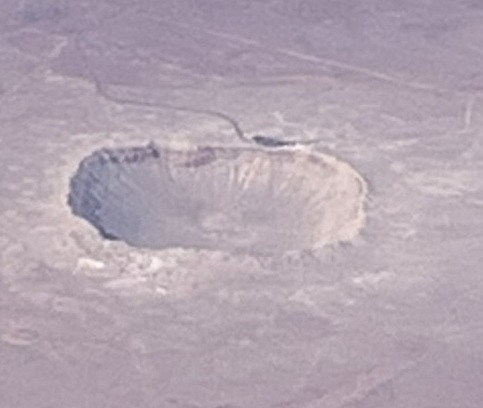
Barringer crater as viewed from an airplane

On August 8, 1964, two commercial pilots in a Cessna 150 flew low over the crater. After crossing the rim, they could not maintain level flight. The pilot attempted to circle in the crater to climb over the rim. During the attempted climb out, the aircraft stalled, crashed, and caught fire. The plane is commonly reported to have run out of fuel, but this is incorrect. Both occupants were severely injured, but survived. A small portion of the wreckage not removed from the crash site remains visible.

In 2006, a project called METCRAX (meteor crater experiment) investigated "the diurnal buildup and breakdown of basin temperature inversions or cold-air pools and the associated physical and dynamical processes accounting for their evolving structure and morphology."

== Tourist attraction ==
Meteor Crater is a popular tourist destination with roughly 270,000 visitors per year. The crater is owned by a family company, the Barringer Crater Company. Meteor Crater is an important educational and research site. It was used to train Apollo astronauts and continues to be an active training site for astronauts.

The Meteor Crater Visitor Center sits on the north rim of the crater. It features interactive exhibits and displays about meteorites and asteroids, space, the Solar System, and comets including the American Astronaut Wall of Fame and such artifacts on display as an Apollo boilerplate command module (BP-29), a 1,406 lb (638 kg) meteorite found in the area, and meteorite specimens from Meteor Crater that can be touched. Formerly known as the Museum of Astrogeology, the Visitor Center includes a Discovery Center & Space Museum, a movie theater, a gift shop, and observation areas with views inside the rim of the crater. Guided tours of the rim are offered daily, weather permitting.

== See also ==
- Barringer Medal
- List of impact craters on Earth
- Elugelab island, in the Pacific – a smaller-volume nuclear blast crater, despite being created by an object with an almost identical estimated energy release as the Barringer event, 10.4 megatons.
