= Cristobalite =

Silica mineral, polymorph of quartz

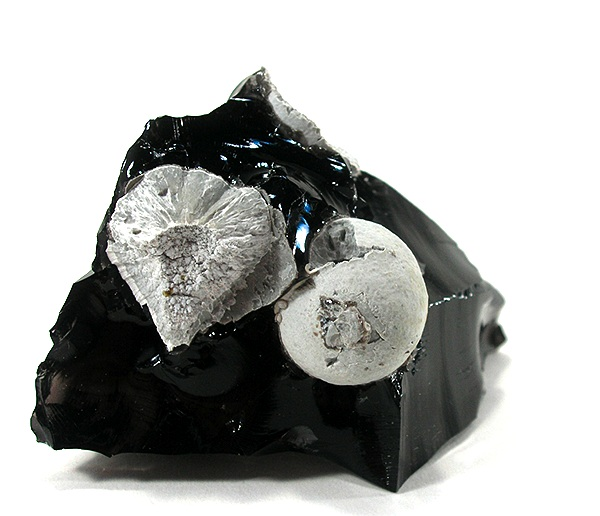
- Cristobalite spherulites formed by devitrification from the obsidian matrix. Specimen from California, US; size: 5.9 cm × 3.8 cm × 3.8 cm (2.3 in × 1.5 in × 1.5 in).

General
- Category: Tectosilicate minerals
- Group: Quartz group
- Formula: SiO_{2}
- IMA symbol: Crs
- Strunz classification: 4.DA.15
- Dana classification: 75.1.1.1
- Crystal system: Tetragonal
- Crystal class: Trapezohedral (422)
- Space group: P4_{1}2_{1}2, P4_{3}2_{1}2
- Unit cell: a = 4.9709(1) Å, c = 6.9278(2) Å; Z = 4 (α polytype)

Structure
- Jmol (3D): Interactive image

Identification
- Color: Colorless, white
- Crystal habit: Octahedra or spherulites up to several cm in diameter
- Twinning: on {111}
- Fracture: Conchoidal
- Tenacity: Brittle
- Mohs scale hardness: 6–7
- Luster: Vitreous
- Streak: White
- Diaphaneity: Transparent
- Specific gravity: 2.32–2.36
- Optical properties: Uniaxial (−)
- Refractive index: n_{ω} = 1.487 n_{ε} = 1.484
- Birefringence: 0.003
- Pleochroism: None
- Melting point: 1,713 °C (3,115 °F) (β)

Cristobalite (/krɪˈstoʊbəlaɪt/ krist-OH-bə-lyte) is a mineral polymorph of silica that is formed at very high temperatures. It has the same chemical formula as quartz, SiO_{2}, but a distinct crystal structure. Both quartz and cristobalite are polymorphs with all the members of the quartz group, which also include coesite, tridymite and stishovite. It is named after Cerro San Cristóbal in Pachuca Municipality, Hidalgo, Mexico.

It is used in dentistry as a component of alginate impression materials as well as for making models of teeth.

== Properties ==
=== Metastability ===
Cristobalite is stable only above 1470 °C, but can crystallize and persist metastably at lower temperatures. The persistence of cristobalite outside its thermodynamic stability range occurs because the transition from cristobalite to quartz or tridymite is "reconstructive", requiring the breaking up and reforming of the silica framework. These frameworks are composed of SiO_{4} tetrahedra in which every oxygen atom is shared with a neighbouring tetrahedron, so that the chemical formula of silica is SiO_{2}. The breaking of these bonds, required to convert cristobalite to tridymite and quartz, requires considerable activation energy and may not happen on a human time frame at room temperature. Framework silicates are also known as tectosilicates.

When devitrifying silica, cristobalite is usually the first phase to form, even when well outside its thermodynamic stability range. This is an example of Ostwald's step rule. The dynamically disordered nature of the β phase is partly responsible for the low enthalpy of fusion of silica.

P-T Diagram for SiO_{2}

=== Structures ===
There is more than one form of the cristobalite framework. At high temperatures, the structure is called β-cristobalite. It is in the cubic crystal system, space group Fd3̅m (No. 227, Pearson symbol cF104). It has the diamond structure, but instead of carbon atoms as in diamond, it consists of linked tetrahedra of silicon and oxygen. A chiral tetragonal form called α-cristobalite (space group either P4_{1}2_{1}2, No. 92, or P4_{3}2_{1}2, No. 96, at random) occurs on cooling below about 250 °C at ambient pressure and is related to the cubic form by static tilting of the silica tetrahedra in the framework. This transition is variously called the low-high or $\alpha{-}\beta$ transition. It may be termed "displacive"; i.e., it is not generally possible to prevent the cubic β form from becoming tetragonal by rapid cooling. Under rare circumstances the cubic form may be preserved if the crystal grain is pinned in a matrix that does not allow for the considerable spontaneous strain that is involved in the transition, which causes a change in shape of the crystal. This transition is highly discontinuous. Going from the α form to the β form causes an increase in volume of 3 or 4 percent. The exact transition temperature depends on the crystallinity of the cristobalite sample, which itself depends on factors such as how long it has been annealed at a particular temperature.

The cubic β phase consists of dynamically disordered silica tetrahedra. The tetrahedra remain fairly regular and are displaced from their ideal static orientations due to the action of a class of low-frequency phonons called rigid unit modes. It is the "freezing" of one of these rigid unit modes that is the soft mode for the α–β transition.

In β-cristobalite, there are right-handed and left-handed helices of tetrahedra (or of silicon atoms) parallel to all three axes. In the α–β phase transition, however, only the right-handed or the left-handed helix in one direction is preserved (the other becoming a two-fold screw axis), so only one of the three degenerate cubic crystallographic axes retains a fourfold rotational axis (actually a screw axis) in the tetragonal form. (That axis becomes the "c" axis, and the new "a" axes are rotated 45° compared to the other two old axes. The new "a" lattice parameter is shorter by approximately the square root of 2, so the α unit cell contains only 4 silicon atoms rather than 8.) The choice of axis is arbitrary, so that various twins can form within the same grain. These different twin orientations coupled with the discontinuous nature of the transition (volume and slight shape change) can cause considerable mechanical damage to materials in which cristobalite is present and that pass repeatedly through the transition temperature, such as refractory bricks.

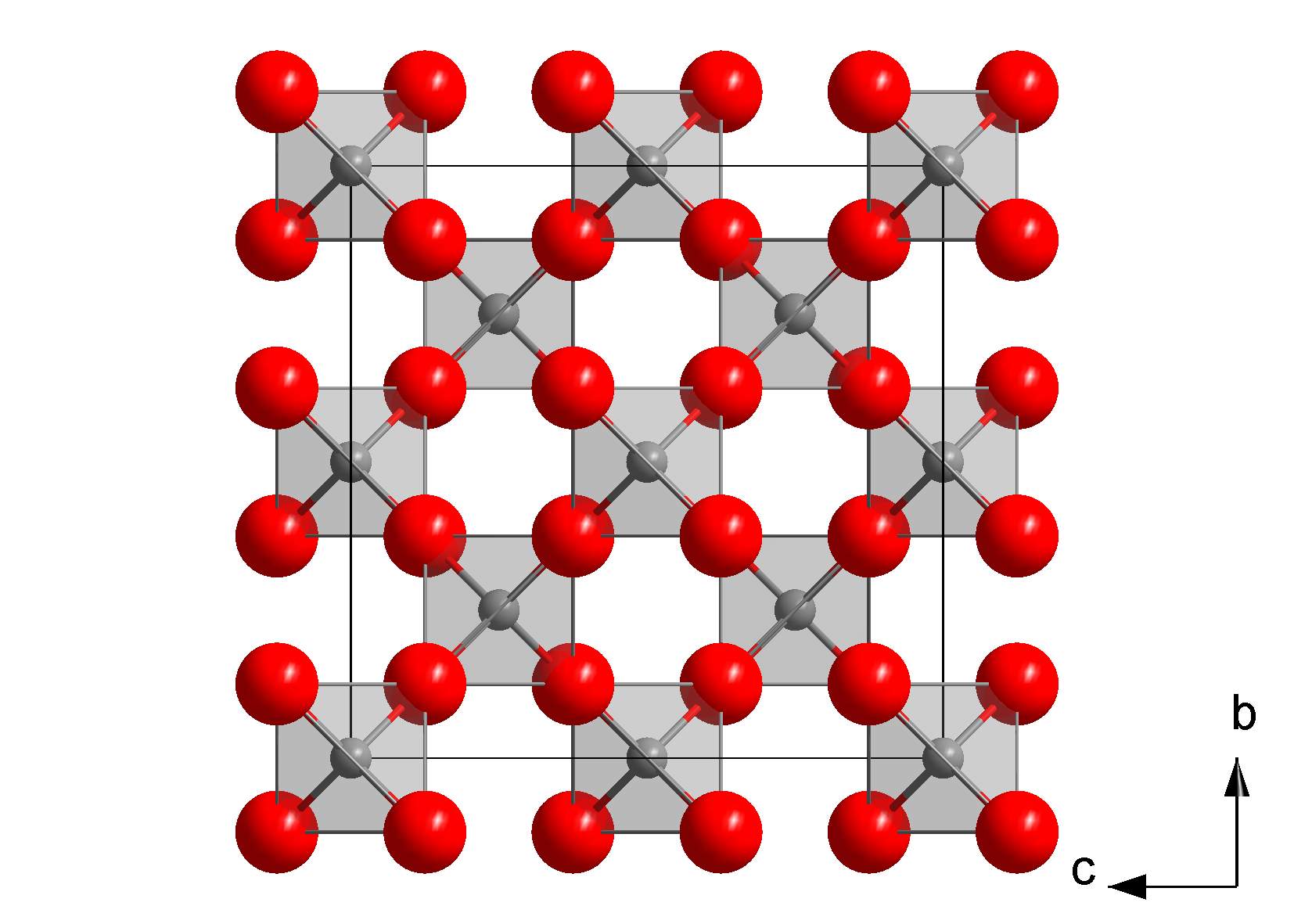
An idealized model of β-cristobalite, showing corner-bonded SiO_{4} tetrahedra. There is a right-handed four-fold screw axis at the centre of half the white squares, and a left-handed one at the centre of the others. In this projection we see glide planes parallel to the axes and mirrors on the diagonals. In reality the tetrahedra are constantly wobbling.

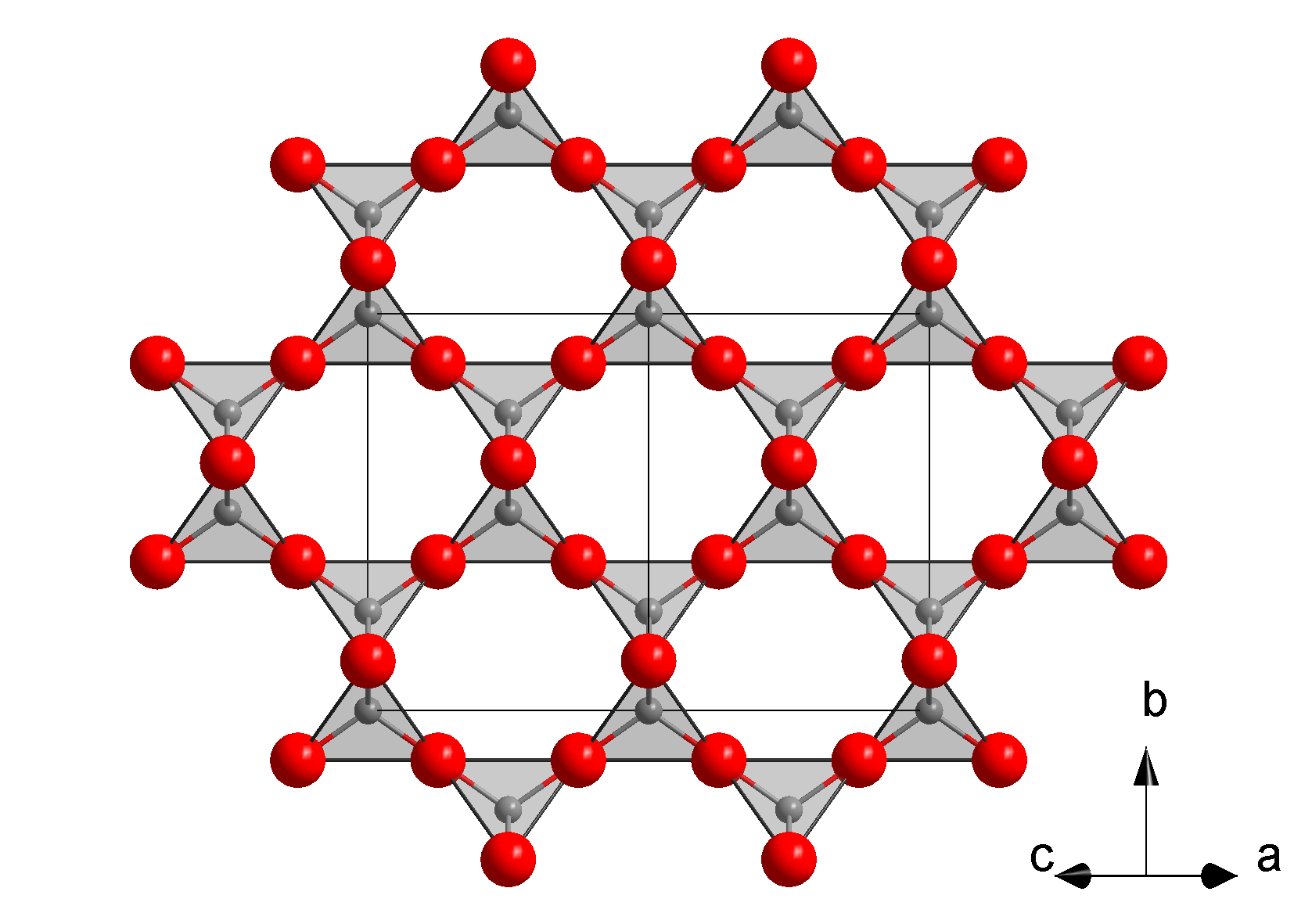
β-cristobalite viewed along the 101 direction

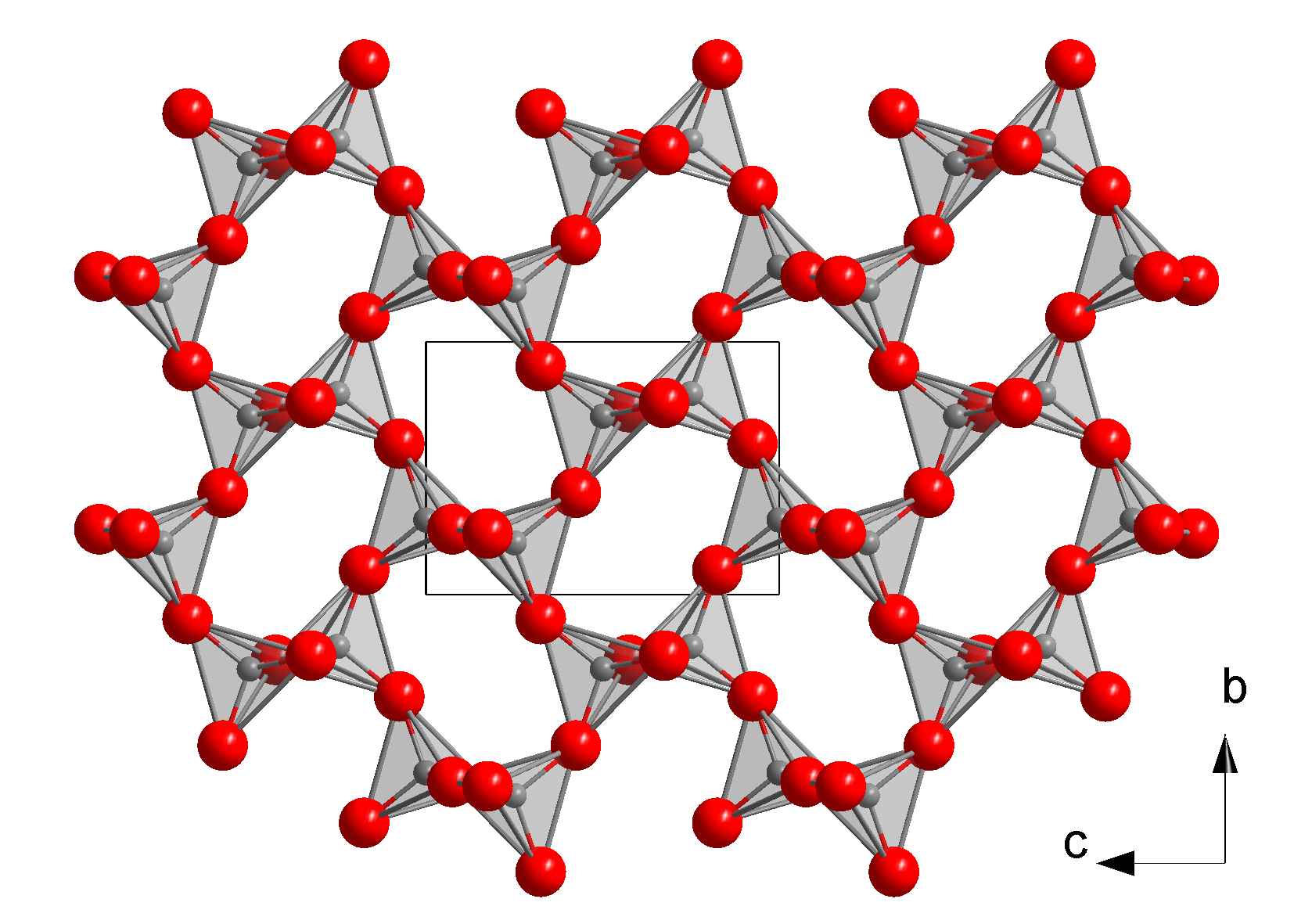
The crumpled framework of α-cristobalite, related to the β form by static tilting of the tetrahedra. This view corresponds to the view along the 101 direction of the previous illustration, except that the "b" axis of that picture is now horizontal. The two-fold screw axes appear here as two-fold axes of rotation going through the middle of the white areas and between the pairs of almost superimposed oxygen atoms.

Unit cell of α-cristobalite; red spheres are oxygen atoms. We see here five silicon atoms in a helix (the first and the last are equivalent atoms in the lattice) going in the "c" direction (into the page). The horizontal and vertical axes are the "a" axes.

Unit cell of β-cristobalite; red spheres are oxygen atoms.

== Occurrence ==
Cristobalite occurs as white octahedra or spherulites in acidic volcanic rocks and in converted diatomaceous deposits in the Monterey Formation of the US state of California and similar areas.

The micrometre-scale spheres that make up precious opal exhibit some X-ray diffraction patterns that are similar to that of cristobalite, but lack any long-range order so they are not considered true cristobalite. In addition, the presence of structural water in opal makes it doubtful that opal consists of cristobalite.

Cristobalite is visible as the white inclusions in snowflake obsidian, a volcanic glass.
