= Friedrich Seifert =

German mineralogist and geophysicist (1941–2026)

Friedrich Alfred Seifert (8 May 1941 – 7 May 2026) was a German mineralogist and geophysicist. He was the founding director of Bayerisches Geoinstitut at University of Bayreuth. A silicate mineral, seifertite, is named after him.

== Life and work ==
Seifert was born in Dresden, Germany on 8 May 1941. He studied mineralogy at the University of Kiel and the University of Zurich and received his PhD degree from the University of Zurich in 1966 for his work on the rock metamorphosis at high temperatures and pressures. For his post-doctorate work, Seifert moved to University of Bochum and defended a habilitation thesis in 1970. In 1972, he became professor at the University of Bochum. He then stayed at the Carnegie Geophysical Laboratory in Washington, DC, where he applied Mössbauer spectroscopy to study the kinetics of the formation of rocks and minerals. After returning to Germany in 1974, he assumed a professor position at the University of Kiel. Seifert changed to the University of Bayreuth in 1986 and became the first director of the newly founded Bayerisches Geoinstitut at the university. Seifert died on 7 May 2026, one day before his 85th birthday.

== Awards and honors ==
Seifert was a member of several academic societies, including Academia Europaea (1990), German Academy of Sciences Leopoldina (1991), Göttingen Academy of Sciences (1992) and Bavarian Academy of Sciences and Humanities (2006). In 1987, he was awarded the Gottfried Wilhelm Leibniz Prize, worth €2.5 million. In 1994, he received an honorary doctorate from the Faculty of Science and Technology at Uppsala University, Sweden. In 2004, he received the Abraham Gottlob Werner Medal for achievements in the experimental and theoretical petrology and spectroscopy of minerals and silicate melts.

In 2008, a high-pressure polymorph of quartz (SiO_{2}), seifertite, was named after Seifert. This mineral and its name are officially recognized by the International Mineralogical Association.
