= Gretchen Goldman =

American environmental scientist

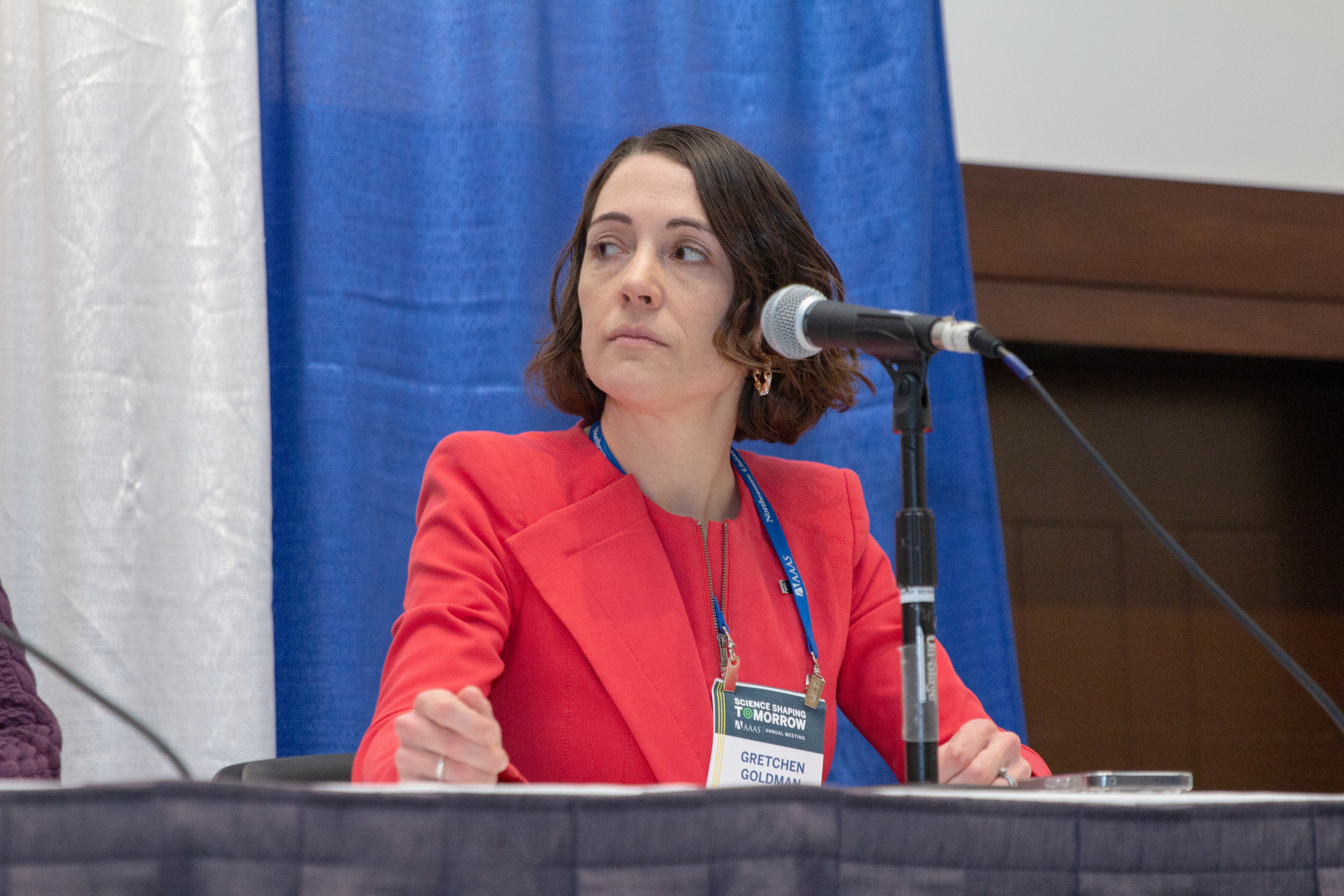
- Education: Cornell University, Georgia Tech, Georgia Tech
- Occupation: Environmental engineer
- Employers: Office of Science and Technology Policy; Union of Concerned Scientists; United States Department of Transportation
- Website: gretchengoldman.com

Gretchen Goldman is an American environmental scientist, policy advocate, and the president of the Union of Concerned Scientists. In 2024 she was the climate change research and technology director at the U.S. Department of Transportation and served between July 2021 and 2023 as the assistant director for environmental science, engineering, policy, and justice for the White House Office of Science and Technology Policy. Through a viral tweet and her work with 500 Women Scientists, she has also become known as an advocate for working mothers in the STEM fields.

== Education ==
Goldman earned a bachelor's degree in Atmospheric Science at Cornell University in 2006. She then went on to earn a master's and PhD in Environmental Engineering at Georgia Tech in 2008 and 2011 respectively.

== Career ==
Following a postdoc at Georgia Tech, Goldman served for 10 years as research director for the Center for Science and Democracy at the Union of Concerned Scientists, where she led research efforts at the intersection of science and policy. In this role, she led research in environmental justice, fossil fuels, climate change, energy production, and scientific integrity. During the first Trump administration, she warned of the potential chilling effects on science due to the removal of scientific information from government websites. Her team documented 206 attacks on science by the Trump administration during his first term. She has testified before Congress and offered proposals that have been adopted by the Biden Administration.

Between July 2021 and 2023, Goldman served as the assistant director for environmental science, engineering, policy, and justice for the White House Office of Science and Technology Policy. There she focused on issues including climate equity, air quality, indigenous knowledge, environmental justice, and scientific integrity.

As the climate change research and technology director at the U.S. Department of Transportation in 2024, Goldman was recognized for her work on decarbonization of the transportation sector and her efforts to improve community resilience in the face of climate change.

Goldman has also served as an expert on the Public Health Rulemaking of the California Department of Conservation's Geologic Energy Management Division. Goldman chaired the Air and Climate Public Advisory Committee for the Metropolitan Washington Council of Governments in 2017 and 2018. She served in the UNESCO/AAAS Consultation Group.

As of February 3, 2025, Goldman rejoined the Union of Concerned Scientists as president.

Goldman is a member of the board of 500 Women Scientists. Through this group, she has worked to support working mothers in STEM fields during the pandemic. In an attempt to raise awareness for the struggles faced by mothers working from home, Goldman posted what became a viral tweet that brought attention to the cause. It showed the chaotic reality of the home office she was using during an online video conference. She continues to fight to protect women's opportunities in the workplace.

She has been quoted and featured in many news outlets including The Washington Post, The New York Times, Science, Nature, CNN, BBC, and NPR.

== Awards ==
- 2024, Secretary's Award, U.S. Department of Transportation
- 2022, Young Alumni Achievement Award, Cornell University
- 2022, Georgia Tech alumni 40 Under 40 List
- 2020, named in Glamour Magazine's Women of the Year

== Personal life ==
Goldman has two sons.

== List of works ==
- Mittelman, Anjuliee; Goldman, Gretchen; Rechtman, Liya; Vennema, Alessandra; Bhanjee, Sheliza; Klein, Georgia; Patronella, Amy; Richardt, Emily; Lamoureux, Katie; Fox, Emma (January 2025). USDOT Climate Strategies that Work (DOT-VNTSC-OST-25-03) (PDF). Washington, D.C.: United States. Department of Transportation.
- Desikan, Anita; MacKinney, Taryn; Kalman, Casey; Carter, Jacob M.; Reed, Genna; Goldman, Gretchen T. (March 1, 2023). "An equity and environmental justice assessment of anti-science actions during the Trump administration". Journal of Public Health Policy. 44 (1): 147–162. doi:10.1057/s41271-022-00390-6. PMC 9896454. PMID 36737622.
- Wyndham, Jessica; Weisenberg, Nathaniel; McCarty, Catherine; Goldman, Gretchen; Brown, Matthew; Borenstein, Jason (August 16, 2022). UNESCO Recommendation on Science and Scientific Researchers and the United States: An Analysis of Key Themes. doi:10.1126/aaas.ade8203.
- Reed, Genna; Hendlin, Yogi; Desikan, Anita; MacKinney, Taryn; Berman, Emily; Goldman, Gretchen T. (December 2021). "The disinformation playbook: how industry manipulates the science-policy process—and how to restore scientific integrity". Journal of Public Health Policy. 42 (4): 622–634. doi:10.1057/s41271-021-00318-6. PMC 8651604. PMID 34811464.
- Goldman, Gretchen T.; Desikan, Anita; Morse, Richard; Kalman, Casey; MacKinney, Taryn; Cohan, Daniel S.; Reed, Genna; Parras, Juan (December 1, 2022). "Assessment of Air Pollution Impacts and Monitoring Data Limitations of a Spring 2019 Chemical Facility Fire". Environmental Justice. 15 (6): 362–372. Bibcode:2022EnvJ...15..362G. doi:10.1089/env.2021.0030.
- Carter, Jacob M.; Goldman, Gretchen T.; Rosenberg, Andrew A.; Reed, Genna; Desikan, Anita; MacKinney, Taryn (February 12, 2021). "Strengthen scientific integrity under the Biden administration". Science. 371 (6530): 668–671. Bibcode:2021Sci...371..668C. doi:10.1126/science.abg0533. PMID 33574196.
- Goldman, Gretchen T.; Carter, Jacob M.; Wang, Yun; Larson, Janice M. (April 23, 2020). "Perceived losses of scientific integrity under the Trump administration: A survey of federal scientists". PLOS ONE. 15 (4) e0231929. Bibcode:2020PLoSO..1531929G. doi:10.1371/journal.pone.0231929. PMC 7179855. PMID 32324823.
- Declet-Barreto, Juan; Goldman, Gretchen T.; Desikan, Anita; Berman, Emily; Goldman, Joshua; Johnson, Charise; Montenegro, Leonard; Rosenberg, Andrew A. (May 3, 2020). "Hazardous air pollutant emissions implications under 2018 guidance on U.S. Clean Air Act requirements for major sources". Journal of the Air & Waste Management Association. 70 (5): 481–490. Bibcode:2020JAWMA..70..481D. doi:10.1080/10962247.2020.1735575. PMID 32101104.
- Goldman, Gretchen T.; Dominici, Francesca (March 29, 2019). "Don't abandon evidence and process on air pollution policy". Science. 363 (6434): 1398–1400. Bibcode:2019Sci...363.1398G. doi:10.1126/science.aaw9460. PMID 30898845.
- Goldman, Gretchen T.; Berman, Emily; Halpern, Michael; Johnson, Charise; Kothari, Yogin; Reed, Genna; Rosenberg, Andrew A. (February 17, 2017). "Ensuring scientific integrity in the Age of Trump". Science. 355 (6326): 696–698. Bibcode:2017Sci...355..696G. doi:10.1126/science.aam5733. PMID 28209862.
- Goldman, GT; Mulvey, K; Frumhoff, P; Sethi, R; Pfirman, S; Commoss, H (2017). "A Methodology for Assessment of Corporate Responsibility on Climate Change: A Case Study of the Fossil Energy Industry" (PDF). Journal of Environmental Investing. 8 (1).
- Carroll, Carlos; Hartl, Brett; Goldman, Gretchen T.; Rohlf, Daniel J.; Treves, Adrian; Kerr, Jeremy T.; Ritchie, Euan G.; Kingsford, Richard T.; Gibbs, Katherine E.; Maron, Martine; Watson, James E. M. (October 2017). "Defending the scientific integrity of conservation-policy processes". Conservation Biology. 31 (5): 967–975. Bibcode:2017ConBi..31..967C. doi:10.1111/cobi.12958. PMID 28741747.
- Strickland, Matthew J; Gass, Katherine M; Goldman, Gretchen T; Mulholland, James A (March 2015). "Effects of ambient air pollution measurement error on health effect estimates in time-series studies: a simulation-based analysis". Journal of Exposure Science & Environmental Epidemiology. 25 (2): 160–166. Bibcode:2015JESEE..25..160S. doi:10.1038/jes.2013.16. PMC 4721572. PMID 23571405.
- Rosenberg, A; Phartiyal, P; Goldman, G; Branscomb, L (October 1, 2014). "Exposing Fracking to Sunlight". Issues in Science and Technology. 31 (1): 74–79.
- Goldman, GT; Mulholland, JA; Russell, AG; Gass, K; Strickland, MJ; Tolbert, PE (September 2012). "Characterization of Ambient Air Pollution Measurement Error in a Time-Series Health Study using a Geostatistical Simulation Approach". Atmospheric Environment. 57: 101–108. Bibcode:2012AtmEn..57..101G. doi:10.1016/j.atmosenv.2012.04.045. PMC 3628542. PMID 23606805.
- Goldman, Gretchen T; Mulholland, James A; Russell, Armistead G; Strickland, Matthew J; Klein, Mitchel; Waller, Lance A; Tolbert, Paige E (December 2011). "Impact of exposure measurement error in air pollution epidemiology: effect of error type in time-series studies". Environmental Health. 10 (1): 61. Bibcode:2011EnvHe..10...61G. doi:10.1186/1476-069X-10-61. PMC 3146396. PMID 21696612.
- Goldman, Gretchen T.; Mulholland, James A.; Russell, Armistead G.; Srivastava, Abhishek; Strickland, Matthew J.; Klein, Mitchel; Waller, Lance A.; Tolbert, Paige E.; Edgerton, Eric S. (October 1, 2010). "Ambient Air Pollutant Measurement Error: Characterization and Impacts in a Time-Series Epidemiologic Study in Atlanta". Environmental Science & Technology. 44 (19): 7692–7698. Bibcode:2010EnST...44.7692G. doi:10.1021/es101386r. PMC 2948846. PMID 20831211.
