= Johanna Chao Kreilick =

President of the Union of Concerned Scientists

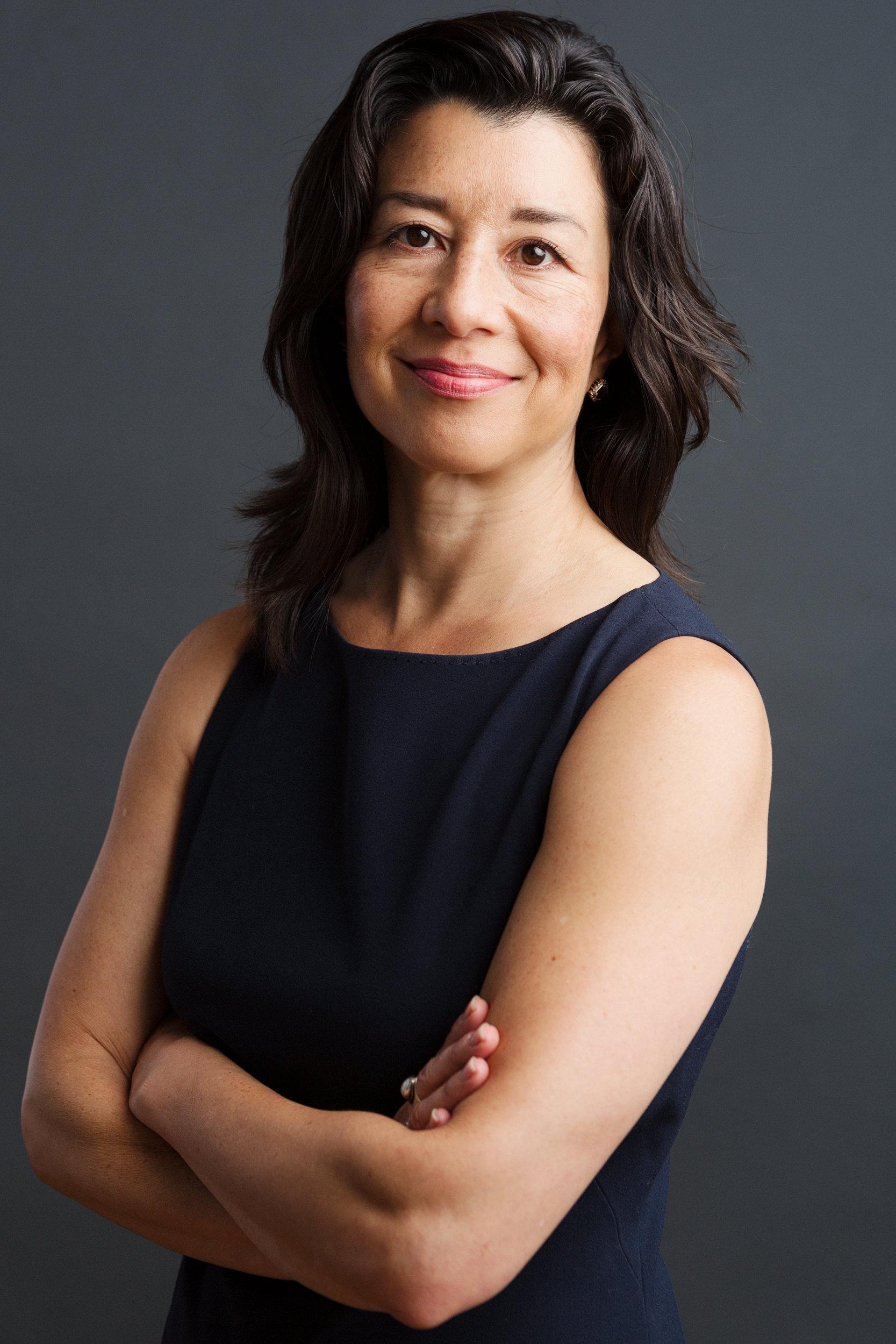
- Kreilick in October 2017
- Education: Stanford University, Harvard Kennedy School of Government
- Scientific career
- Fields: Science advocacy, social justice
- Workplaces: Union of Concerned Scientists, Open Society Foundations, the Hauser Center for Nonprofit Organizations at Harvard University, and the Unitarian Universalist Service Committee

Johanna Chao Kreilick is the Chief Strategy Officer at Blue Ocean Law, a Pacific-led public-interest law firm founded by Julian Aguon focused on climate justice, ocean governance, and Indigenous rights. In this role, she works on efforts related to the implementation of findings by the International Court of Justice concerning state responsibility for climate harm.

Kreilick was the president of the Union of Concerned Scientists, a scientific advocacy nonprofit based in the United States from May 2021 - February 2024. She represented the organization in lobbying Congress and business leaders to address climate change.

Kreilick previously led major international initiatives with the Open Society Foundations, the Hauser Center for Nonprofit Organizations at Harvard University, and the Unitarian Universalist Service Committee. She is noted for her work on racial justice and for engaging scientists, lawyers and civil society advocates in effective decision making.

== Early life and education ==
Kreilick studied anthropology at Stanford University, receiving her B.A. with distinction. She was named the 2005 Lucius N. Littauer Fellow at the Harvard Kennedy School of Government, where she earned an M.P.A.

== Career ==
Kreilick established a grant-making program for economic justice at the Unitarian Universalist Service Committee (UUSC), working with partners in 62 countries around the world. Those she supported include Asian and Pacific Islander immigrant communities and workers worldwide.

Kreilick established the Justice and Human Rights Program at the Hauser Center for Nonprofit Organizations at Harvard University, focusing on international criminal justice and prison reform.

In 2013 Kreilick joined the Open Society Foundations. As an executive officer she was responsible for its Strategy Unit including the planning, research and the assessment of over fifty programs globally. She also founded a major Climate Action Initiative at the Foundations.

Kreilick became President of the Union of Concerned Scientists (UCS) in May 2021..

She also serves on a number of advisory boards for organizations including the Climate Policy Initiative, the Environmental Voter Project, the BlueGreen Alliance and TSNE MissionWorks.
