= Union of Concerned Scientists =

U.S.-based nonprofit organization

- Formation: 1969
- Headquarters: Cambridge, Massachusetts, U.S.
- Members: over 200,000
- President: Gretchen Goldman
- Founder: Kurt Gottfried, Henry Way Kendall
- Revenue: $55.5 million (2025)
- Expenses: $49.8 million (2025)
- Staff: 251 (2023)
- Website: www.ucs.org

The Union of Concerned Scientists (UCS) is a nonprofit science advocacy organization based in the United States. The UCS membership includes many private individuals in addition to professional scientists. Kim Waddell chairs the UCS Board of Directors as of 2025, having replaced Dr. Anne Kapuscinski.

== History ==
The Union of Concerned Scientists was founded in 1969 by faculty and students of the Massachusetts Institute of Technology. The organization's founding document says it was formed to "initiate a critical and continuing examination of governmental policy in areas where science and technology are of actual or potential significance" and to "devise means for turning research applications away from the present emphasis on military technology toward the solution of pressing environmental and social problems." The organization employs scientists, economists, and engineers engaged in environmental and security issues, as well as executive and support staff.

One of the co-founders was physicist and Nobel laureate Henry Kendall, who served for many years as chairman of the board of UCS.

In 1992, Kendall presided over the World Scientists' Warning to Humanity, which called for "fundamental change" to address a range of security and environmental issues. The document was signed by 1700 scientists, including a majority of the Nobel prize winners in the sciences.

In 1997, the UCS presented their "World Scientists Call For Action" petition to world leaders meeting to negotiate the Kyoto Protocol. The declaration asserted, "A broad consensus among the world's climatologists is that there is now 'a discernible human influence on global climate.'" It urged governments to make "legally binding commitments to reduce industrial nations' emissions of heat-trapping gases", and called global warming "one of the most serious threats to the planet and to future generations." The petition was signed by "more than 1,500 of the world's most distinguished senior scientists, including the majority of Nobel laureates in science." When a petition that questioned the consensus was circulated by the Oregon Institute of Science and Medicine, a small, privately-funded institute, was signed by more than 17,000 science graduates, UCS declared it a "deliberate attempt to deceive the scientific community with misinformation."

On December 11, 2006, the UCS issued a statement calling for the restoration of scientific integrity to federal policy-making, which was signed by 10,600 leading scientists including 52 Nobel laureates, 63 National Medal of Science recipients and almost 200 members of the National Academies of Science.

In August 2008, the UCS purchased billboards at the airports in Denver, Colorado, and Minneapolis–Saint Paul, Minnesota, where the Democratic and Republican presidential conventions were to be held. The two nearly identical billboards showed the downtown areas of each convention city in a cross hairs, with the message that "when only one nuclear bomb could destroy a city" like Minneapolis or Denver, "we don't need 6,000." The name of Senator John McCain or Senator Barack Obama follows, with this admonition: "It's time to get serious about reducing the nuclear threat." The billboards were removed after a complaint from Northwest Airlines, the official airline of the Republican convention. The UCS has accused Northwest, whose headquarters were in Minnesota, of "taking on a new role as censor" and of having acted because it regarded the Minneapolis advertisement as "scary" and "anti-McCain".

In June 2020, a UCS staffer named Ruth Tyson resigned and sent a 17-page open letter expressing her opinions on racial inequality in the organization, saying that ideas of black workers were routinely dismissed or given low priority. After reading the letter, UCS president Ken Kimmell responded by saying the criticism was fair, and that he believed it was reflective of a wider culture of white supremacy in society, vowing to address issues and diversify the UCS workforce. His successor, Johanna Chao Kreilick, was chosen in part for "her track record of integrating racial justice into the work and culture of complex organizations".

In February 2025, noted environmental scientist and policy advocate Dr. Gretchen Goldman became the organization's president.

== Funding and governance ==
According to the organization's IRS Form 990, the UCS received $39.9 million in total revenue and had $3.1 million in expenses and $48.8 million in net assets for the tax year beginning October 1, 2017, and ending September 30, 2018.

In February 2004, the UCS published "Scientific Integrity in Policymaking". The report criticized the administration of U.S. President George W. Bush for "politicizing" science. Some of the allegations include altering information in global warming reports by the Environmental Protection Agency (EPA), and choosing members of scientific advisory panels based on their business interests rather than scientific experience. In July 2004, the UCS released an addendum to the report in which they criticize the Bush administration and allege that reports on West Virginia strip mining had been improperly altered, and that "well-qualified" nominees for government posts such as Nobel laureate Torsten Wiesel were rejected because of political differences. On April 2, 2004, John Marburger, the director of the White House Office of Science and Technology Policy, issued a statement claiming that incident descriptions in the UCS report are "false", "wrong", or "a distortion", and dismissed the report as "biased". UCS responded to the White House document by saying that Marburger's claims were unjustified. UCS later wrote that from then on, the Bush administration was "virtually silent" about the issue.

== Issue stances ==
UCS has been critical of proposed Generation III reactor designs. Edwin Lyman, a senior staff scientist at UCS, has challenged specific cost-saving design choices made for both the AP1000 and Economic Simplified Boiling Water Reactor.

The UCS endorsed the 2007 Forests Now Declaration, which calls for new market based mechanism to protect forests, as the group has recognised the importance of curbing deforestation to tackle climate change.

The group also supports governmental incentives for people who want to preserve undeveloped land instead of selling it to developers.

The UCS opposes the use of space weapons and supports efforts to reduce the number of nuclear weapons around the world.
