= Hauser Center for Nonprofit Organizations =

Center at Harvard University

Established by Rita Hauser and her husband Gustave M. Hauser in 1997, the Hauser Center for Nonprofit Organizations at Harvard Kennedy School at Harvard University was formed with the goal of expanding understanding and accelerating critical thinking about civil society among scholars, practitioners, policy makers, and the general public, by encouraging scholarship, developing curriculum, fostering mutual learning between academics and practitioners, and shaping policies that enhance the sector and its role in society.

In 2013 the Hauser Center merged with the Harvard Center for Public Leadership to form the Hauser Institute for Civil Society within the Harvard Kennedy School's Center for Public Leadership, led by Hanna Riley Bowles and Deval Patrick.
