= Stishovite =

Tetragonal form of silicon dioxide

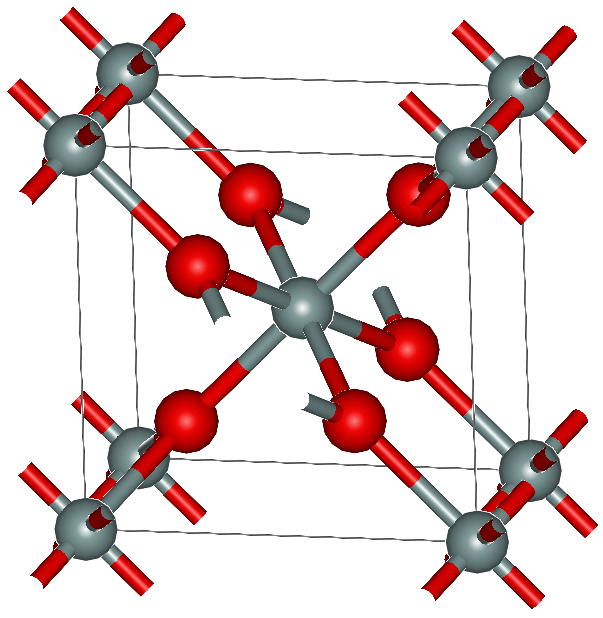
- Crystal structure of stishovite

General
- Category: Tectosilicate minerals
- Group: Quartz group
- Formula: SiO_{2}
- IMA symbol: Sti
- Strunz classification: 4.DA.40 (Oxides)
- Crystal system: Tetragonal
- Crystal class: Ditetragonal dipyramidal (4/mmm); H–M symbol: (4/m 2/m 2>/m)
- Space group: P4_{2}/mnm (No. 136)
- Unit cell: a = 4.1772(7) Å, c = 2.6651(4) Å; Z = 2

Identification
- Color: Colorless (when pure)
- Mohs scale hardness: 9.5
- Luster: Vitreous
- Diaphaneity: Transparent to translucent
- Specific gravity: 4.35 (synthetic); 4.29 (calculated)
- Optical properties: Uniaxial (+)
- Refractive index: n_{ω} = 1.799–1.800 n_{ε} = 1.826–1.845
- Birefringence: δ = 0.027
- Melting point: (decomposes)

Pressure-temperature diagram for various forms of silicon dioxide, including stishovite (at top left)

Stishovite (/ˈstɪʃəvaɪt/ STISH-ə-vyte) is an extremely hard, dense tetragonal form (polymorph) of silicon dioxide. It is very rare on the Earth's surface; however, it may be a predominant form of silicon dioxide in the Earth, especially in the lower mantle.

Stishovite was named after Sergey Stishov, a Soviet high-pressure physicist who first synthesized the mineral in 1961. It was then discovered in Meteor Crater in 1962 by Edward C. T. Chao.

Unlike other silica polymorphs, stishovite features six-coordinated silicon centers, being bound to six oxides. Its crystal structure resembles that of rutile, one polymorph of TiO_{2}. Similarly, the oxides are three-connected, unlike low-pressure forms of SiO_{2} where the oxides link only pairs of Si atoms. In most silicates, silicon is tetrahedral, being bound to four oxides. It was long considered the hardest known oxide (~30 GPa Vickers); however, boron suboxide has been discovered in 2002 to be much harder. At normal temperature and pressure, stishovite is metastable.

Stishovite can be separated from quartz by applying hydrogen fluoride (HF); unlike quartz, stishovite will not react.

== Appearance ==
Large natural crystals of stishovite are extremely rare and are usually found as clasts of 1 to 2 mm in length. When found, they can be difficult to distinguish from regular quartz without laboratory analysis. It has a vitreous luster, is transparent (or translucent), and is extremely hard. Stishovite usually sits as small rounded gravels in a matrix of other minerals.

== Synthesis ==
The only known occurrences of stishovite in nature formed at the very high shock pressures (>100 kbar, or 10 GPa) and temperatures (> 1200 °C) present during hypervelocity meteorite impact into quartz-bearing rock. Minute amounts of stishovite have been found within diamonds, and post-stishovite phases were identified within ultra-high-pressure mantle rocks. Stishovite may also be synthesized by duplicating these conditions in the laboratory, either isostatically or through shock (see shocked quartz). At 4.287 g/cm^{3}, it is the second densest polymorph of silica, after seifertite. It has tetragonal crystal symmetry, P4_{2}/mnm, No. 136, Pearson symbol tP6.

== See also ==
- Coesite, another mineral form of silicon dioxide
- Thaumasite, another rare mineral with hexacoordinated octahedral silica
