= Coesite =

Silica mineral, rare polymorph of quartz

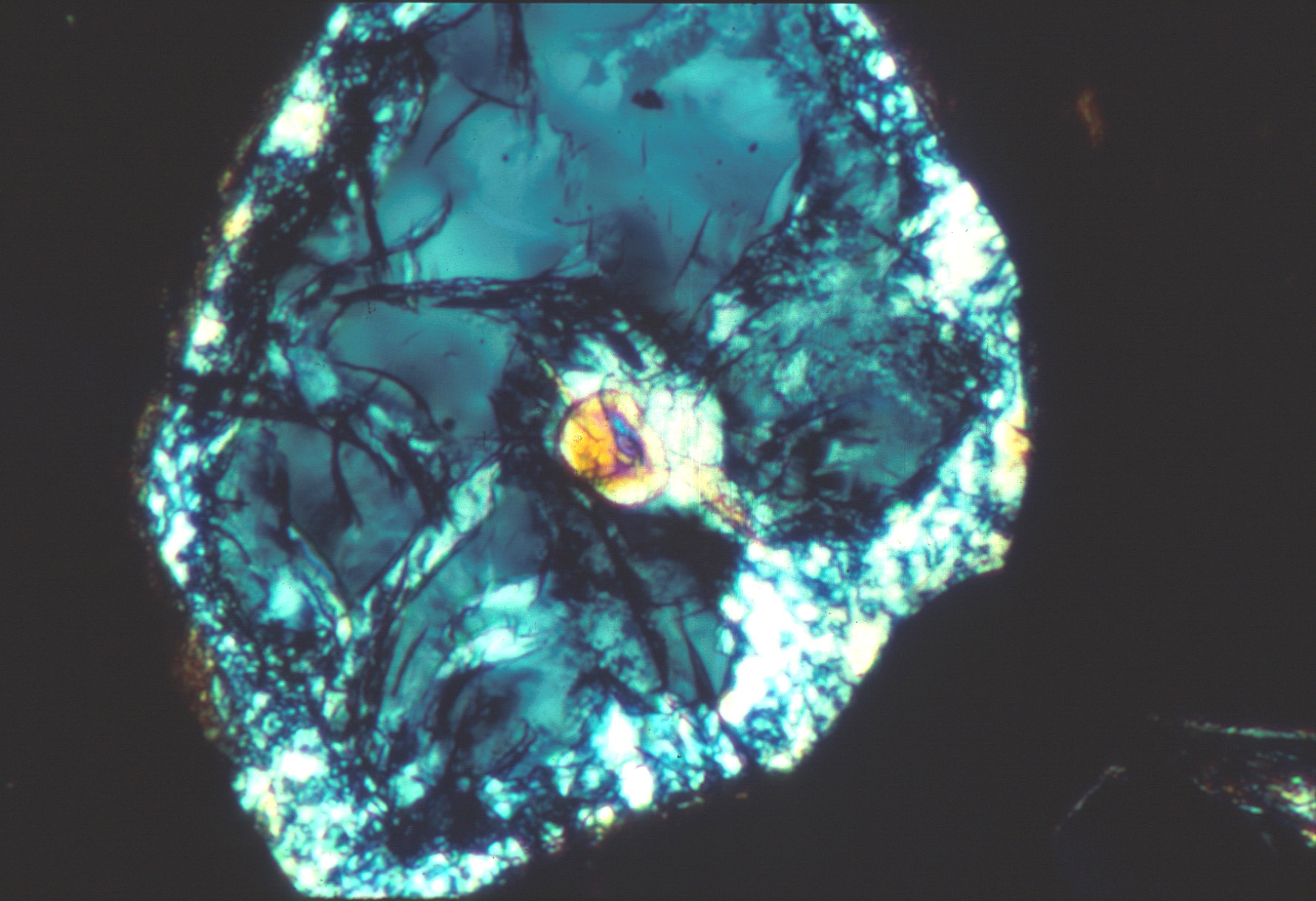
- Crossed-polars image of coesite grain (gray) ~1 mm across in eclogite. Small, colored inclusion is pyroxene. Polycrystalline rim is quartz.

General
- Category: Tectosilicate minerals
- Group: Quartz group
- Formula: SiO_{2}
- IMA symbol: Coe
- Strunz classification: 4.DA.35
- Crystal system: Monoclinic
- Crystal class: Prismatic (2/m) (same H–M symbol)
- Space group: C2/c
- Unit cell: a = 7.143 b = 12.383 c = 7.143 [Å] β = 120.00° Z = 16

Identification
- Formula mass: 60.0843 g/mol
- Color: Colorless
- Crystal habit: Inclusions in UHP metamorphic minerals up to 3 mm in size
- Fracture: Conchoidal
- Tenacity: Brittle
- Mohs scale hardness: 7.5-8
- Luster: Vitreous
- Streak: White
- Diaphaneity: Transparent
- Density: 2.92 (calculated)
- Optical properties: Biaxial
- Refractive index: n_{x} = 1.594 n_{y} = 1.595 n_{z} = 1.599
- Birefringence: +0.006
- 2V angle: 60–70

Coesite (/ˈkoʊsaɪt/) is a form (polymorph) of silicon dioxide (SiO_{2}) that is formed when very high pressure (2–3 gigapascals), and moderately high temperature (700 °C, 1,300 °F), are applied to quartz. Coesite was first synthesized by Loring Coes, Jr., a chemist at the Norton Company, in 1953.

== Occurrences ==
In 1960, a natural occurrence of coesite was reported by Edward C. T. Chao, in collaboration with Eugene Shoemaker, from Barringer Crater, in Arizona, US, which was evidence that the crater must have been formed by an impact. After this report, the presence of coesite in unmetamorphosed rocks was taken as evidence of a meteorite impact event or of an atomic bomb explosion. It was not expected that coesite would survive in high pressure metamorphic rocks.

In metamorphic rocks, coesite was initially described in eclogite xenoliths from the mantle of the Earth that were carried up by ascending magmas; kimberlite is the most common host of such xenoliths. In metamorphic rocks, coesite is now recognized as one of the best mineral indicators of metamorphism at very high pressures (UHP, or ultrahigh-pressure metamorphism). Such UHP metamorphic rocks record subduction or continental collisions in which crustal rocks are carried to depths of 70 km (43 mi) or more. Coesite is formed at pressures above about 2.5 GPa (25 kbar) and temperature above about 700 °C. This corresponds to a depth of about 70 km in the Earth. It can be preserved as mineral inclusions in other phases because as it partially reverts to quartz, the quartz rim exerts pressure on the core of the grain, preserving the metastable grain as tectonic forces uplift and expose these rock at the surface. As a result, the grains have a characteristic texture of a polycrystalline quartz rim (see infobox figure).

Coesite has been identified in UHP metamorphic rocks around the world, including the western Alps of Italy at Dora Maira, the Ore Mountains of Germany, the Lanterman Range of Antarctica, in the Kokchetav Massif of Kazakhstan, in the Western Gneiss region of Norway, the Dabie-Shan Range in Eastern China, the Himalayas of Eastern Pakistan, and in the Appalachian Mountains of Vermont.

== Crystal structure ==
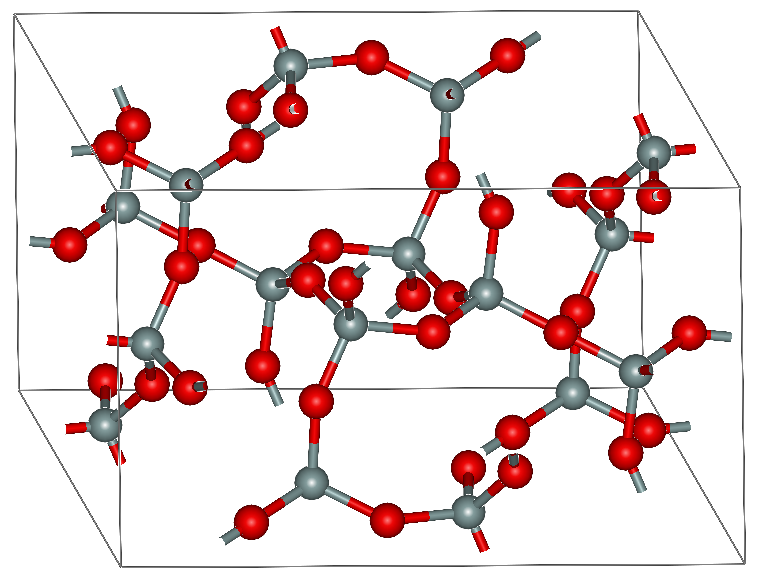
Atomic structure of coesite

Coesite is a tectosilicate with each silicon atom surrounded by four oxygen atoms in a tetrahedron. Each oxygen atom is then bonded to two Si atoms to form a framework. There are two crystallographically distinct Si atoms and five different oxygen positions in the unit cell. Although the unit cell is close to being hexagonal in shape ("a" and "c" are nearly equal and β nearly 120°), it is inherently monoclinic and cannot be hexagonal. The crystal structure of coesite is similar to that of feldspar and consists of four silicon dioxide tetrahedra arranged in Si_{4}O_{8} and Si_{8}O_{16} rings. The rings are further arranged into chains. This structure is metastable within the stability field of quartz: coesite will eventually decay back into quartz with a consequent volume increase, although the metamorphic reaction is very slow at the low temperatures of the Earth's surface. The crystal symmetry is monoclinic C2/c, No.15, Pearson symbol mS48.

== See also ==
- Seifertite, forming at higher pressure than stishovite
- Stishovite, a higher-pressure polymorph
