= Silicon dioxide =

Oxide of silicon

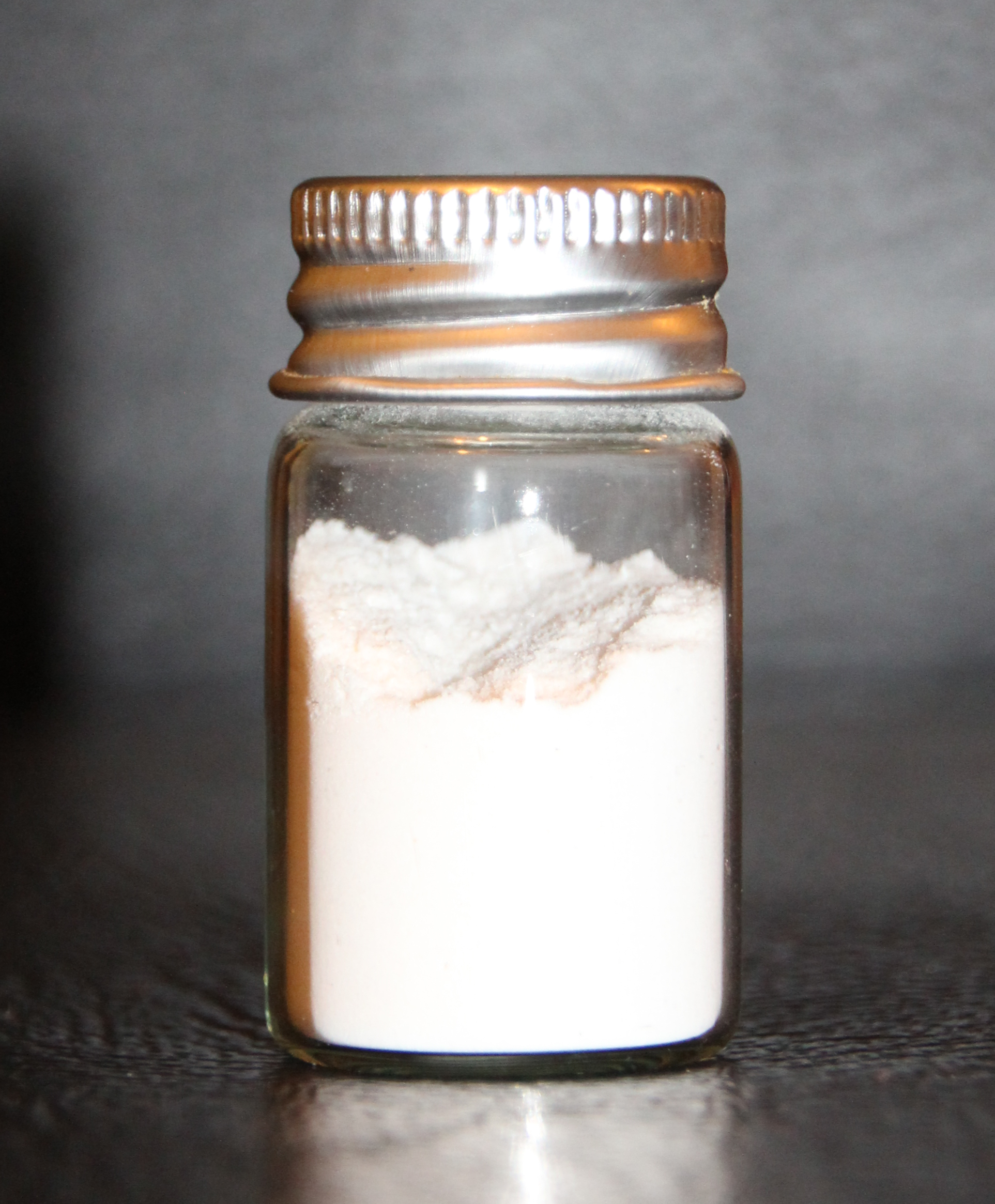
- A sample of silicon dioxide

Names
- IUPAC name Silicon dioxide
- Other names: Quartz; Silica; Silicic oxide; Silicon(IV) oxide; Crystalline silica; Pure Silica; Silicea; Silica sand

Identifiers
CAS Number	7631-86-9
ChEBI	CHEBI:30563
ChemSpider	22683
ECHA InfoCard	100.028.678
EC Number	231-545-4
E number	E551 (acidity regulators, ...)
Gmelin Reference	200274
KEGG	C16459
MeSH	Silicon+dioxide
PubChem CID	24261
RTECS number	VV7565000
UNII	ETJ7Z6XBU4
CompTox Dashboard (EPA)	DTXSID1029677
- InChI: InChI=1S/O2Si/c1-3-2 Key: VYPSYNLAJGMNEJ-UHFFFAOYSA-N

Properties
Chemical formula	SiO_{2}
Molar mass	60.08 g/mol
Appearance	Colorless crystals or white crystalline powder
Density	2.648 (α-quartz), 2.196 (amorphous) g·cm^{−3}
Melting point	1,713 °C (3,115 °F; 1,986 K) (amorphous)
Boiling point	2,950 °C (5,340 °F; 3,220 K)
Magnetic susceptibility (χ)	−29.6·10^{−6} cm^{3}/mol
Thermal conductivity	12 (|| c-axis), 6.8 (⊥ c-axis), 1.4 (am.) W/(m⋅K)
Refractive index (n_{D})	1.544 (o), 1.553 (e)

Hazards
NFPA 704 (fire diamond)	0 0 0
- NIOSH (US health exposure limits)
PEL (Permissible)	TWA 20 mppcf (80 mg/m^{3}/%SiO_{2}) (amorphous)
REL (Recommended)	TWA 6 mg/m^{3} (amorphous); Ca TWA 0.05 mg/m^{3}
IDLH (Immediate danger)	3000 mg/m^{3} (amorphous); Ca [25 mg/m^{3} (cristobalite, tridymite); 50 mg/m^{3} (quartz)]

Related compounds
Related dioxides	Carbon dioxide Germanium dioxide Tin dioxide Lead dioxide
Related compounds	Silicon monoxide Silicon disulfide

Thermochemistry
Std molar entropy (S^{⦵}_{298})	42 J·mol^{−1}·K^{−1}
Std enthalpy of formation (Δ_{f}H^{⦵}_{298})	−911 kJ·mol^{−1}
- Except where otherwise noted, data are given for materials in their standard state (at 25 °C [77 °F], 100 kPa). verify (what is ?) Infobox references

Silicon dioxide, also known as silica, is the main dioxide of silicon. With the chemical formula SiO_{2}, it is commonly found in nature as quartz. Silica is the major constituent of sand. Silica is one of the most complex and abundant families of materials, existing as several minerals and as a synthetic product. Examples include fused quartz, fumed silica, opal, and aerogels. It is used in structural materials, microelectronics, and as components in the food and pharmaceutical industries. All forms are white or colorless, although impure samples can be colored or opaque. Silicon dioxide is the main constituent of most glass.

== Structure ==
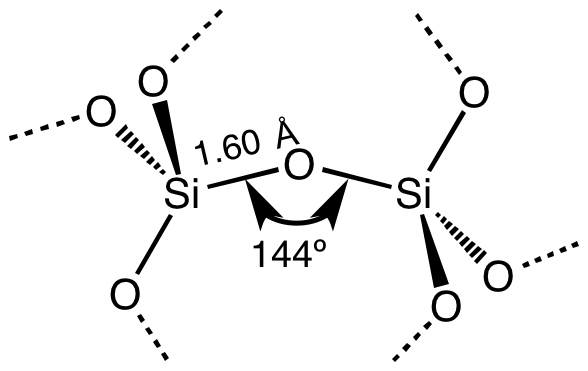
Structural motif found in α-quartz, but also found in almost all forms of silicon dioxide

Typical subunit for low pressure silicon dioxide

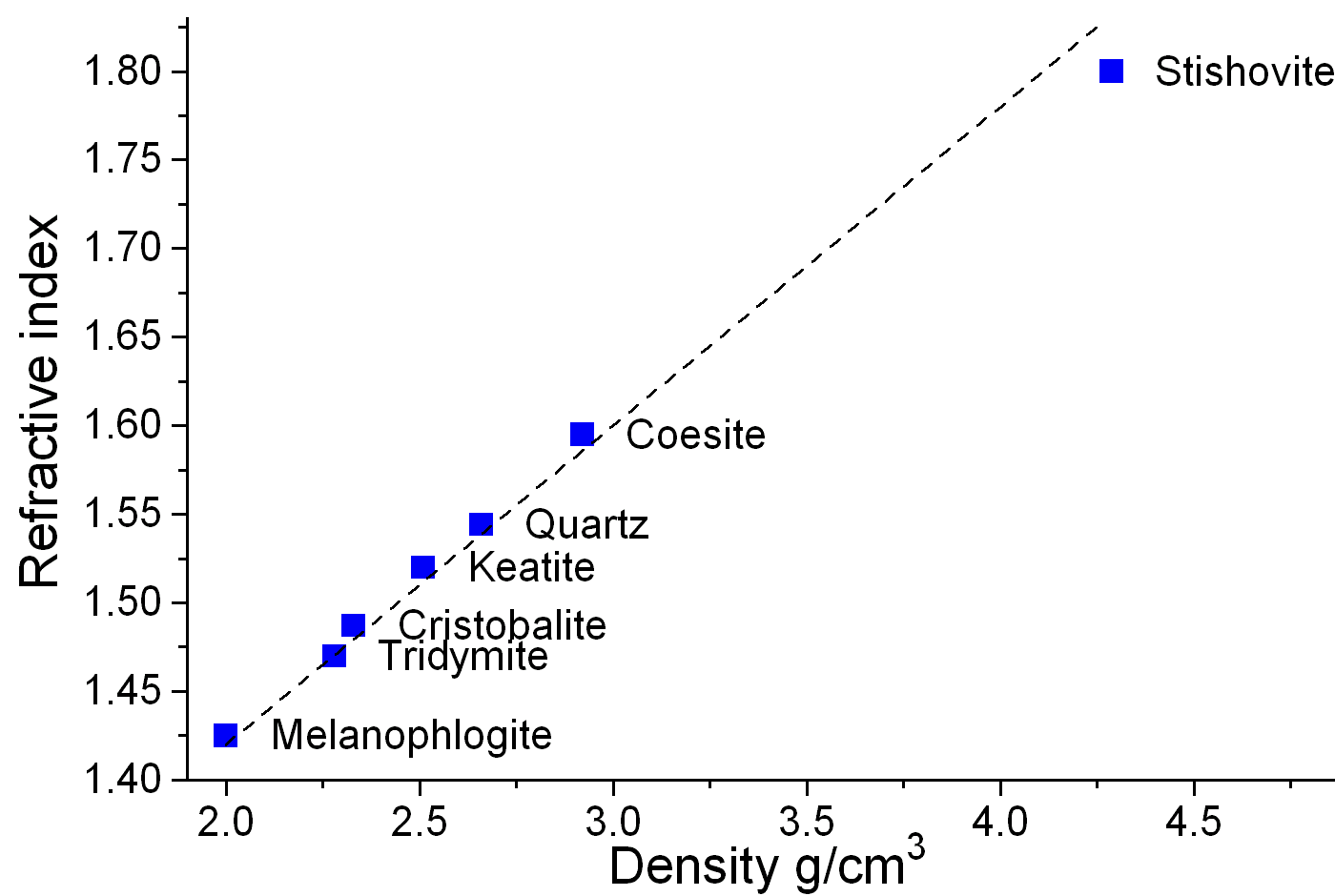
Relationship between refractive index and density for some SiO_{2} forms

In the majority of silicon dioxides, the silicon atom shows tetrahedral coordination, with four oxygen atoms surrounding a central Si atom (see 3-D Unit Cell). Thus, SiO_{2} forms 3-dimensional network solids in which each silicon atom is covalently bonded in a tetrahedral manner to 4 oxygen atoms. In contrast, CO_{2} is a linear molecule. The starkly different structures of the dioxides of carbon and silicon are a manifestation of the double bond rule.

Based on the crystal structural differences, silicon dioxide can be divided into two categories: crystalline and non-crystalline (amorphous). In crystalline form, this substance can be found naturally occurring as quartz, tridymite (high-temperature form), cristobalite (high-temperature form), stishovite (high-pressure form), and coesite (high-pressure form). On the other hand, amorphous silica can be found in nature as opal and diatomaceous earth. Quartz glass is a form of intermediate state between these structures.

Many of these distinct crystalline forms have the same local structure around Si and O. In α-quartz the Si–O bond length is 161 pm, whereas in α-tridymite it is in the range 154–171 pm. The Si–O–Si angle also varies between a low value of 140° in α-tridymite, up to 180° in β-tridymite. In α-quartz, the Si–O–Si angle is 144°.

=== Polymorphism ===
Alpha quartz is the most stable form of solid SiO_{2} at room temperature. The high-temperature minerals, cristobalite and tridymite, have both lower densities and refractive indices than quartz. The transformation from α-quartz to beta-quartz takes place abruptly at 573 °C. Since the transformation is accompanied by a significant change in volume, it can easily induce fracturing of ceramics or rocks passing through this temperature limit. The high-pressure minerals, seifertite, stishovite, and coesite, though, have higher densities and indices of refraction than quartz. Stishovite has a rutile-like structure where silicon is 6-coordinate. The density of stishovite is 4.287 g/cm^{3}, which compares to α-quartz, the densest of the low-pressure forms, which has a density of 2.648 g/cm^{3}. The difference in density is the less open structure. The change in the coordination increases the ionicity of the Si–O bond.

Faujasite silica, another polymorph, is obtained by the dealumination of a low-sodium, ultra-stable Y zeolite with combined acid and thermal treatment. The resulting product contains over 99% silica, and has high crystallinity and specific surface area (over 800 m^{2}/g). Faujasite-silica has very high thermal and acid stability. For example, it maintains a high degree of long-range molecular order or crystallinity even after boiling in concentrated hydrochloric acid.

=== Molten SiO_{2} ===
Molten silica exhibits several peculiar physical characteristics that are similar to those observed in liquid water: negative temperature expansion, density maximum at temperatures ~5000 °C, and a heat capacity minimum. Its density decreases from 2.08 g/cm^{3} at 1950 °C to 2.03 g/cm^{3} at 2200 °C.

=== Molecular SiO_{2} ===
Molecular silicon dioxide has a linear structure like CO_{2}. It is mainly of academic interest. It has been generated by combining silicon monoxide (SiO) with oxygen in an argon matrix. The dimeric silicon dioxide, (SiO_{2})_{2} has been obtained by reacting O_{2} with matrix isolated dimeric silicon monoxide, (Si_{2}O_{2}). In dimeric silicon dioxide there are two oxygen atoms bridging between the silicon atoms with an Si–O–Si angle of 94° and bond length of 164.6 pm and the terminal Si–O bond length is 150.2 pm. The Si–O bond length is 148.3 pm, which compares with the length of 161 pm in α-quartz. The bond energy is estimated at 621.7 kJ/mol. All molecular forms of silicon dioxide rapidly and irreversibly polymerize when these gases are condensed.

== Natural occurrence ==
=== Geology ===

SiO_{2} is most commonly encountered in nature as quartz, which comprises more than 10% by mass of the Earth's crust. Quartz is the only polymorph of silica stable at the Earth's surface. Metastable occurrences of the high-pressure forms coesite and stishovite have been found around impact structures and associated with eclogites formed during ultra-high-pressure metamorphism. The high-temperature forms of tridymite and cristobalite are known from silica-rich volcanic rocks. In many parts of the world, silica is the major constituent of sand.

=== Biology ===
Even though it is poorly soluble, silica occurs in many plants such as rice. Plant materials with high silica phytolith content appear to be of importance to grazing animals, from chewing insects to ungulates. Silica accelerates tooth wear, and high levels of silica in plants frequently eaten by insects may have developed as a defense mechanism against predation.

Silica is also the primary component of rice husk ash, which is used, for example, in filtration and as supplementary cementitious material (SCM) in cement and concrete manufacturing.

Silicification in and by cells has been common in the biological world and it occurs in bacteria, protists, plants, and animals (invertebrates and vertebrates).

Prominent examples include:

- Tests or frustules (i.e. shells) of diatoms, Radiolaria, and testate amoebae.
- Silica phytoliths in the cells of many plants including Equisetaceae, many grasses, and a wide range of dicotyledons.
- The spicules forming the skeleton of many sponges.

== Uses ==
=== Structural use ===
About 95% of the commercial use of silicon dioxide (sand) is in the construction industry, e.g. in the production of concrete (Portland cement concrete).

Certain deposits of silica sand, with desirable particle size and shape and desirable clay and other mineral content, were important for sand casting of metallic products. The high melting point of silica enables it to be used in applications such as iron casting; modern sand casting sometimes uses other minerals for other reasons.

Crystalline silica is used in hydraulic fracturing of formations which contain tight oil and shale gas.

=== Precursor to glass and silicon ===
Silica is the primary ingredient in the production of most glass. As other minerals are melted with silica, the principle of freezing point depression lowers the melting point of the mixture and increases fluidity. The glass transition temperature of pure SiO_{2} is about 1475 K. When molten silicon dioxide SiO_{2} is rapidly cooled, it does not crystallize, but solidifies as a glass. Because of this, most ceramic glazes have silica as the main ingredient.

The chemical structure of glass is similar to that in quartz and most other forms of silicon dioxide. Silicon is surrounded by regular tetrahedra of oxygen centres. The difference between the glass and crystalline forms arises from the connectivity of the tetrahedral units: Although there is no long-range periodicity in the glassy network, ordering remains at length scales well beyond the Si-O bond length. One example of this ordering is the preference to form six-membered rings of tetrahedra.

The majority of optical fibers for telecommunications are also made from silica. It is a primary raw material for many ceramics such as earthenware, stoneware, and porcelain.

Silicon dioxide is used to produce elemental silicon. The process involves carbothermic reduction in an electric arc furnace:

SiO_{2} + 2 C → Si + 2 CO

=== Fumed silica ===
Fumed silica, also known as pyrogenic silica, is prepared by burning SiCl_{4} in an oxygen-rich hydrogen flame to produce a "smoke" of SiO_{2}.

SiCl_{4} + 2 H_{2} + O_{2} → SiO_{2} + 4 HCl

It can also be produced by vaporizing quartz sand in a 3000 °C electric arc. Both processes result in microscopic droplets of amorphous silica fused into branched, chainlike, three-dimensional secondary particles which then agglomerate into tertiary particles, a white powder with extremely low bulk density (0.03–0.15 g/cm^{3}) and thus high surface area. The particles act as a thixotropic thickening agent, or as an anti-caking agent, and can be treated to make them hydrophilic or hydrophobic for either water or organic liquid applications.

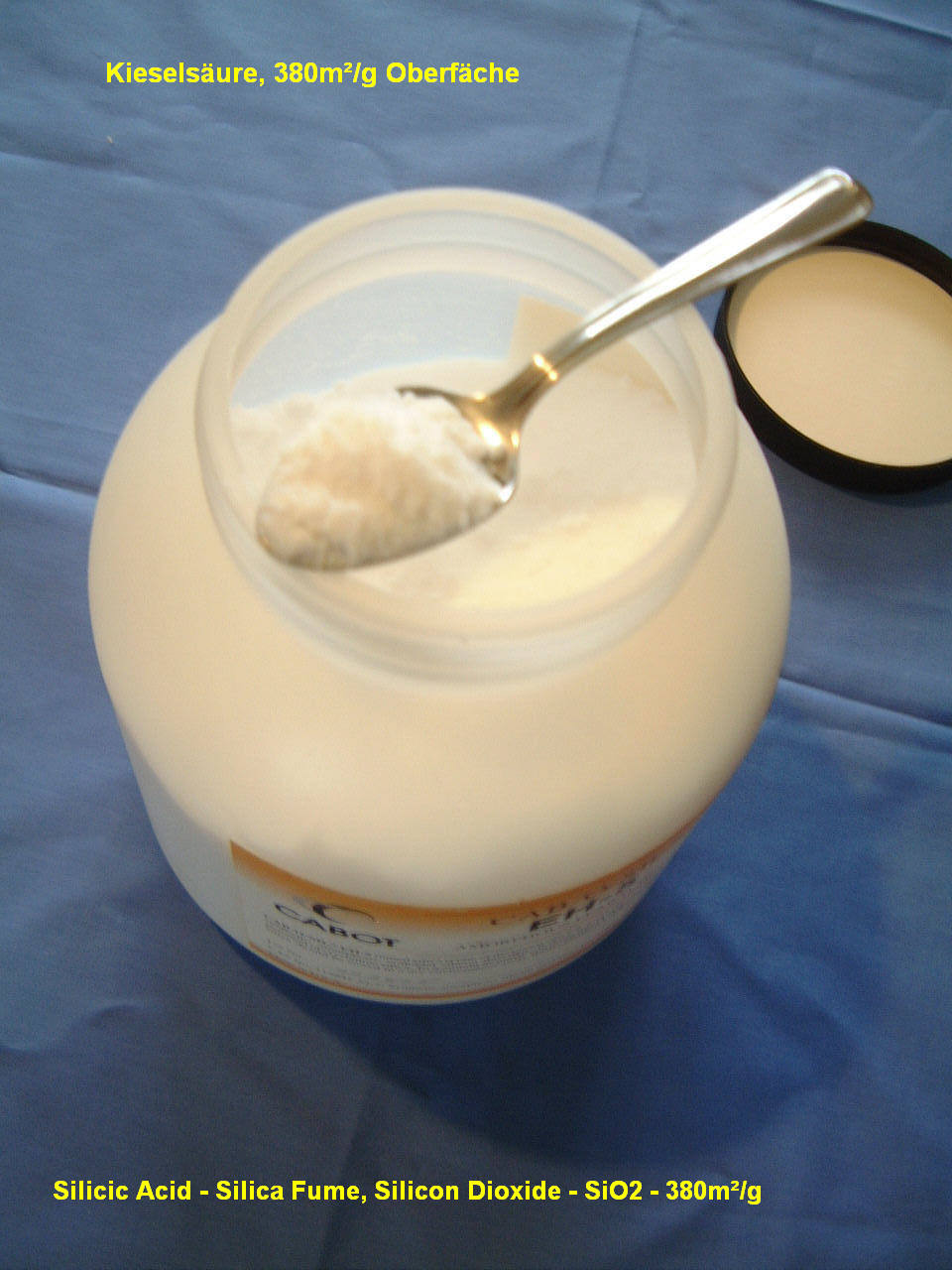
Manufactured fumed silica with maximum surface area of 380 m^{2}/g

Silica fume is an ultrafine powder collected as a by-product of the silicon and ferrosilicon alloy production. It consists of amorphous (non-crystalline) spherical particles with an average particle diameter of 150 nm, without the branching of the pyrogenic product. The main use is as pozzolanic material for high performance concrete. Fumed silica nanoparticles can be successfully used as an anti-aging agent in asphalt binders.

=== Food, cosmetic, and pharmaceutical applications ===
Silica, either colloidal, precipitated, or pyrogenic fumed, is a common additive in food production. It is used primarily as a flow or anti-caking agent in powdered foods such as spices and non-dairy coffee creamer, or powders to be formed into pharmaceutical tablets. It can adsorb water in hygroscopic applications. Colloidal silica is used as a fining agent for wine, beer, and juice, with the E number reference E551.

In cosmetics, silica is useful for its light-diffusing properties and natural absorbency.

=== Semiconductors ===
Silicon dioxide is widely used in the semiconductor technology:

- for the primary passivation (directly on the semiconductor surface),
- as an original gate dielectric in MOS technology. Now that scaling (dimension of the gate length of the MOS transistor) has progressed below 10 nm, silicon dioxide has been replaced by other dielectric materials like hafnium oxide or similar with higher dielectric constant compared to silicon dioxide,
- as a dielectric layer between metal (wiring) layers (sometimes up to 8–10) connecting elements and
- as a second passivation layer (for protecting semiconductor elements and the metallization layers) typically today layered with some other dielectrics like silicon nitride.

The stability of its oxide coating is a major advantage of silicon in microelectronics. Other semiconductors such as gallium arsenide or indium phosphide do not form robust passivating coatings.

Silicon dioxide can be grown on a silicon semiconductor surface. Silicon oxide layers could protect silicon surfaces during diffusion processes, and could be used for diffusion masking.

Surface passivation is the process by which a semiconductor surface is rendered inert, so that its properties do not change semiconductor properties as a result of interaction with air or other materials in contact with the surface or edge of the crystal. The formation of a thermally grown silicon dioxide layer greatly reduces the concentration of electronic states at the silicon surface. SiO_{2} films preserve the electrical characteristics of p–n junctions and prevent these electrical characteristics from deteriorating by the gaseous ambient environment. Silicon oxide layers could be used to electrically stabilize silicon surfaces. The surface passivation process is an important method of semiconductor device fabrication that involves coating a silicon wafer with an insulating layer of silicon oxide passivates surface states and lowers interface trap density. Growing a layer of silicon dioxide on top of a silicon wafer enables it to overcome the surface states.

The process of silicon surface passivation by thermal oxidation (silicon dioxide) is critical to the semiconductor industry. It is commonly used to manufacture metal–oxide–semiconductor field-effect transistors (MOSFETs) and silicon integrated circuit chips (with the planar process).

=== Other ===
Hydrophobic silica is used as a defoamer component.

In its capacity as a refractory, it is useful in fiber form as a high-temperature thermal protection fabric.

Silica is used in the extraction of DNA and RNA due to its ability to bind to the nucleic acids under the presence of chaotropes.

Silica aerogel was used in the Stardust spacecraft to collect extraterrestrial particles.

Amorphous silicon dioxide, being a glass with no distinct melting point, is used to make fibreglass, which is about 65% silica.

== Production ==
Silicon dioxide is mostly obtained by mining, including sand mining and purification of quartz. While mined quartz is suitable for many purposes, chemical processing is required for many applications.

=== Precipitated silica ===
Precipitated silica or amorphous silica is produced by the acidification of solutions of sodium silicate. The gelatinous precipitate, a form of silica gel, is first washed and then dehydrated to produce colorless microporous silica. An idealized equation involving a trisilicate and sulfuric acid is:

Na_{2}Si_{3}O_{7} + H_{2}SO_{4} → 3 SiO_{2} + Na_{2}SO_{4} + H_{2}O

Approximately one billion kilograms/year (1999) of silica were produced in this manner, mainly for use for polymer composites – tires and shoe soles.

=== On microchips ===
Thin films of silica grow spontaneously on silicon wafers via thermal oxidation, producing a very shallow layer of about 1 nm or 10 Å of so-called native oxide. Higher temperatures and alternative environments are used to grow well-controlled layers of silicon dioxide on silicon, for example at temperatures between 600 and 1200 °C, using so-called dry oxidation with O_{2}

Si + O_{2} → SiO_{2}

or wet oxidation with H_{2}O.

Si + 2 H_{2}O → SiO_{2} + 2 H_{2}

The native oxide layer is beneficial in microelectronics, where it acts as electric insulator with high chemical stability. It can protect the silicon, store charge, block current, and even act as a controlled pathway to limit current flow.

=== Laboratory or special methods ===
==== From organosilicon compounds ====
Many routes to silicon dioxide start with an organosilicon compound, e.g., HMDSO, TEOS. Synthesis of silica is illustrated below using tetraethyl orthosilicate (TEOS). Simply heating TEOS at 680–730 °C results in the oxide:

Si(OC_{2}H_{5})_{4} → SiO_{2} + 2 O(C_{2}H_{5})_{2}

Similarly TEOS combusts around 400 °C:

Si(OC_{2}H_{5})_{4} + 12 O_{2} → SiO_{2} + 10 H_{2}O + 8 CO_{2}

TEOS undergoes hydrolysis via the so-called sol-gel process. The course of the reaction and nature of the product are affected by catalysts, but the idealized equation is:

Si(OC_{2}H_{5})_{4} + 2 H_{2}O → SiO_{2} + 4 HOCH_{2}CH_{3}

==== Other methods ====
Being highly stable, silicon dioxide arises from many methods. Conceptually simple, but of little practical value, combustion of silane gives silicon dioxide. This reaction is analogous to the combustion of methane:

SiH_{4} + 2 O_{2} → SiO_{2} + 2 H_{2}O

However the chemical vapor deposition of silicon dioxide onto crystal surface from silane has been carried out with nitrogen as a carrier gas at 200–500 °C.

== Chemical reactions ==
Silicon dioxide is a relatively inert material, hence its widespread occurrence as a mineral and its use for inert containers (e.g. glassware). At high temperatures, it eventually converts to silicon by reduction with carbon, a carbothermic reaction.

Fluorine reacts with silicon dioxide to form SiF_{4} and O_{2} whereas the other halogens (Cl_{2}, Br_{2}, I_{2}) are unreactive.

Most forms of silicon dioxide are attacked ("etched") by hydrofluoric acid (HF) to produce hexafluorosilicic acid:

SiO_{2} + 6 HF → H_{2}SiF_{6} + 2 H_{2}O

HF is used to remove or pattern silicon dioxide in the semiconductor industry. The dissolution process entails addition of fluoride ion to silicon to give a fluorosilicate.

Stishovite does not react with HF to any significant degree. It is this non-reactivity that allows stishovite to be freed from silica-based components.

Silicon dioxide acts as a Lux–Flood acid, being able to react with bases under certain conditions. As it does not contain any hydrogen, non-hydrated silica cannot directly act as a Brønsted–Lowry acid. While silicon dioxide is only poorly soluble in water at low or neutral pH (typically, 2 × 10^{−4} M for quartz up to 10^{−3} M for cryptocrystalline chalcedony), strong bases react with glass and easily dissolve it. Therefore, strong bases have to be stored in plastic bottles to avoid jamming the bottle cap, to preserve the integrity of the container, and to avoid undesirable contamination by silicate anions.

Silicon dioxide dissolves in hot concentrated alkali or fused hydroxide, as described in this idealized equation:

SiO_{2} + 2 NaOH → Na_{2}SiO_{3} + H_{2}O

Silicon dioxide will neutralise basic metal oxides (e.g. sodium oxide, potassium oxide, lead(II) oxide, zinc oxide, or mixtures of oxides, forming silicates and glasses as the Si-O-Si bonds in silica are broken successively). As an example the reaction of sodium oxide and SiO_{2} can produce sodium orthosilicate, sodium silicate, and glasses, dependent on the proportions of reactants:

2 Na_{2}O + SiO_{2} → Na_{4}SiO_{4}

Na_{2}O + SiO_{2} → Na_{2}SiO_{3}

Such glasses have commercial significance, e.g. soda–lime glass, borosilicate glass, lead glass. In these glasses, silica is termed the network former or lattice former. Related reactions are also used in blast furnaces to remove sand impurities in the ore by neutralisation with calcium oxide, forming calcium silicate slag.

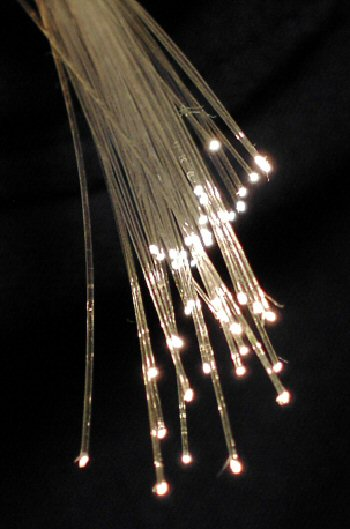
Bundle of optical fibres composed of high purity silica

Silicon dioxide dissolves in a mixture of ethylene glycol and an alkali metal owing to the formation of pentacoordinate silicates.

Silicon dioxide reacts with elemental silicon at high temperatures to produce gaseous SiO:

SiO_{2} + Si → 2 SiO

=== Water solubility ===
The solubility of silicon dioxides in water is essentially zero until high temperatures, which can be achieve high pressure apparatus. Amorphous silica is far more soluble than quartz. This property is used to grow single crystals of quartz in a hydrothermal process where natural quartz is dissolved in superheated water Crystals of 0.5–1 kg can be grown over 1–2 months. These crystals are a source of very pure quartz for use in electronic applications. Above the critical temperature of water 647.096 K (373.946 °C; 705.103 °F) and a pressure of 22.064 megapascals (3,200.1 psi) or higher, water is a supercritical fluid and solubility is once again higher than at lower temperatures.

== Health effects ==
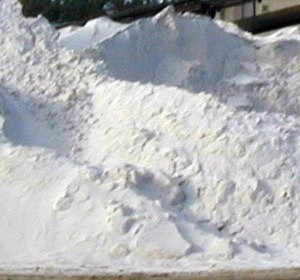
Quartz sand (silica) as main raw material for commercial glass production

Released into the air when rock is crushed or cut in manufacturing, crystalline silica dust, also called respirable crystalline silica, can be inhaled, potentially causing silicosis and increasing the risk of lung cancer when exposure is chronic. Silica dust is an occupational hazard for abrasive blasting workers, bricklayers, construction workers drilling stone, grinding operators, miners, and people with similar chronic exposure.

Silicosis is the world's oldest and most common occupational lung disease. It is a preventable condition having substantial disease and mortality prevalence with no cure.

=== Epidemiology ===
Tens of millions of workers worldwide have potential inhalation exposure to respirable silica dust. Manufacturing and construction industries involving stone dust represent about 63% and 20% of exposure risk, respectively.

In 1995, the World Health Organization pledged efforts to eliminate silicosis worldwide by 2030, but silicosis remains a major disease internationally, as of the 2020s. In 2016, the Global Burden of Disease Study estimated that 10,400 deaths occurred each year, and that 210,000 years of life were lost due to silicosis.

=== Pathophysiology ===
Silica dust particles are sufficiently small to enter terminal lung airways and alveoli where the particles are coated with surfactant. Levels of surfactant increase in a temporary protective manner, after which the surfactant is digested by defensive proteins that accumulate as alveolar debris – a condition called silicoproteinosis, a hallmark of silicosis and impending pulmonary fibrosis.

In attempts to clear the lungs of inhaled dust and protein debris, alveolar macrophages and lysosomes engulf the particles, leading to an increase in digestive enzymes in macrophages, which can stimulate cell death and further accumulation of cell debris. Accumulated macrophage debris collecting in damaged alveoli triggers fibroblast activity, leading to fibrosis, formation of silica-dense nodules, and reduced lung surface area available for gas exchange. The silica particles released by macrophage deterioration can become part of a cycle of debris accumulation, inflammation, lung damage, and inability to breathe.

The most common histopathological finding of silicosis is called a silicotic nodule having zones of collagen-ringed fibers with an outside region containing fibroblasts, lymphocytes, and silica particle-imbedded macrophages.

=== Clinical symptoms ===
Irreversible pulmonary fibrosis leads to severe lung disease. Symptoms include cough and labored breathing within 10 to 30 years after the first major exposure to silica dust. Computerized tomography for chest imaging indicates that silicosis includes nodular opacities typically in the upper lung lobes, lung calcification and fibrosis. Pneumoconiosis is linked to chronic exposure of inhaled silica dust.

=== Regulation ===
Respirable crystalline silica dust is classified by the International Agency for Research on Cancer as a Group 1 human carcinogen. Regulations restricting silica exposure specify the risk is with silica particles that are crystalline and dust-forming.

Respirable crystalline silica is listed in the Workplace Hazardous Materials Information System of Canada as a hazardous material that may cause cancer and damage to organs through prolonged or repeated exposure.

The 2017 OSHA silica standard in the United States requires industry and construction employers to provide medical examinations for workers exposed to silica dust above permissible levels over the applicable work period. After the initial examination, clinical followup is required at least every 3 years. In 2013, the U.S. Occupational Safety and Health Administration proposed reducing the exposure limit to 50 μg/m^{3} of air. The final rule, published on 25 March 2016 and effective from 23 June 2016, set a permissible exposure limit of 50 μg/m^{3} of respirable crystalline silica as an 8-hour time-weighted average, with an action level of 25 μg/m^{3}. The previous limits were approximately equivalent to 100 μg/m^{3} for general industry and 250 μg/m^{3} for construction and shipyards.

=== Workplace risk management ===
The European Network for Silica, NepSi, provides a Good Practice Guide for employers and workers to manage the occupational risk of respirable silica dust across diverse industries. The guide recommends that at each industrial site – before beginning work that may cause workers to have occupational exposure to respirable crystalline silica – employers should perform a rigorous risk assessment to identify and isolate the source and type of silica dust, and determine the extent of exposure in the work environment. The guide encourages that control measures be enforced to eliminate or reduce silica dust exposures in compliance with legal requirements.

== Crystalline forms ==
SiO_{2}, more so than almost any material, exists in many crystalline forms. These forms are called polymorphs.

Crystalline forms of SiO_{2}
Form	Crystal symmetry Pearson symbol, group no.	ρ (g/cm^{3})	Notes	Structure
α-quartz	rhombohedral (trigonal) hP9, P3_{1}21 No.152	2.648	Helical chains making individual single crystals optically active; α-quartz converts to β-quartz at 846 K	
β-quartz	hexagonal hP18, P6_{2}22, No. 180	2.533	Closely related to α-quartz (with an Si-O-Si angle of 155°) and optically active; β-quartz converts to β-tridymite at 1743 K	
α-tridymite	orthorhombic oS24, C222_{1}, No.20	2.265	Metastable form under normal pressure	
β-tridymite	hexagonal hP12, P6_{3}/mmc, No. 194		Closely related to α-tridymite; β-tridymite converts to β-cristobalite at 2010 K	
α-cristobalite	tetragonal tP12, P4_{1}2_{1}2, No. 92	2.334	Metastable form under normal pressure	
β-cristobalite	cubic cF104, Fd3̅m, No.227		Closely related to α-cristobalite; melts at 1978 K	
keatite	tetragonal tP36, P4_{1}2_{1}2, No. 92	2.5	Si_{5}O_{10}, Si_{4}O_{8}, Si_{8}O_{16} rings; synthesised from glassy silica and alkali at 600–900 K and 40–400 MPa	
moganite	monoclinic mS46, C2/c, No.15		Si_{4}O_{8} and Si_{6}O_{12} rings	
coesite	monoclinic mS48, C2/c, No.15	2.911	Si_{4}O_{8} and Si_{8}O_{16} rings; 900 K and 3–3.5 GPa	
stishovite	tetragonal tP6, P4_{2}/mnm, No.136	4.287	One of the densest (together with seifertite) polymorphs of silica; rutile-like with 6-fold coordinated Si; 7.5–8.5 GPa	
seifertite	orthorhombic oP, Pbcn	4.294	One of the densest (together with stishovite) polymorphs of silica; is produced at pressures above 40 GPa.	
melanophlogite	cubic (cP*, P4_{2}32, No.208) or tetragonal (P4_{2}/nbc)	2.04	Si_{5}O_{10}, Si_{6}O_{12} rings; mineral always found with hydrocarbons in interstitial spaces – a clathrasil (silica clathrate)	
fibrous W-silica	orthorhombic oI12, Ibam, No.72	1.97	Like SiS_{2} consisting of edge-sharing chains, melts at ~1700 K	
2D silica	hexagonal		Sheet-like bilayer structure	

== Safety ==
Inhaling finely divided crystalline silica can lead to severe inflammation of the lung tissue, silicosis, bronchitis, lung cancer, and systemic autoimmune diseases, such as lupus and rheumatoid arthritis. Inhalation of amorphous silicon dioxide, in high doses, leads to transient inflammation.

== Other names ==
This extended list enumerates synonyms for silicon dioxide; all of these values are from a single source; values in the source were presented capitalized.

- CAS 112945-52-5
- Acitcel
- Aerosil
- Amorphous silica dust
- Aquafil
- CAB-O-GRIP II
- CAB-O-SIL
- CAB-O-SPERSE
- Colloidal silica
- Colloidal silicon dioxide
- Dicalite
- DRI-DIE Insecticide 67
- FLO-GARD
- Fossil flour
- Fumed silica
- Fumed silicon dioxide
- HI-SEL
- LO-VEL
- Ludox
- Nalcoag
- Nyacol
- Santocel
- Silica
- Silica aerogel
- Silica, amorphous
- Silicic anhydride
- Silikill
- Synthetic amorphous silica
- Vulkasil

== See also ==
- Mesoporous silica
- Orthosilicic acid
- Silicon carbide
