= Hydrothermal mineral deposit =

Geologic Feature

Hydrothermal mineral deposits are accumulations of valuable minerals which formed from hot waters circulating in Earth's crust through fractures. They eventually produce metallic-rich fluids concentrated in a selected volume of rock, which become supersaturated and then precipitate ore minerals. In some occurrences, minerals can be extracted for a profit by mining. Discovery of mineral deposits consumes considerable time and resources and only about one in every one thousand prospects explored by companies are eventually developed into a mine. A mineral deposit is any geologically significant concentration of an economically useful rock or mineral present in a specified area. The presence of a known but unexploited mineral deposit implies a lack of evidence for profitable extraction.

Hydrothermal mineral deposits are divided into six main subcategories: porphyry, skarn, volcanogenic massive sulfide (VMS), sedimentary exhalative (SEDEX), and epithermal and Mississippi Valley-type (MVT) deposits. Each hydrothermal mineral deposit has different distinct structures, ages, sizes, grades, geological formation, characteristics and, most importantly, value. Their names derive from their formation, geographical location or distinctive features.

Generally, porphyry-type mineral deposits form in hydrothermal fluid circulation systems developed around felsic to intermediate magma chambers and/or cooling plutons. However, they did not precipitate directly from the magma. While, a skarn deposit is an assemblage of ore and calc-silicate minerals, formed by metasomatic replacement of carbonate rocks in the contact aureole of a pluton. Volcanogenic massive sulfide deposits form when mafic magma at depth, (perhaps a few kilometers beneath the surface), acts as a heat source, causing convective circulation of seawater through the oceanic crust. The hydrothermal fluid leaches metals as it descends and precipitates minerals as it rises. Sedimentary exhalative deposits, also called sedex deposits, are lead-zinc sulfide deposits formed in intracratonic sedimentary basins by the submarine venting of hydrothermal fluids. These deposits are typically hosted in shale. Hydrothermal epithermal deposits consist of geological veins or groups of closely spaced geological veins. Finally, Mississippi Valley-type (MVT) are hosted in limestone or dolomite that was deposited in a shallow marine environment in a tectonically stable intraplate environment. As expected in such an environment, volcanic rocks, folding and regional metamorphism are absent as a general rule. MVT deposits commonly lie in close proximity to evaporites.

== Background ==
A mineral ore deposit is the volume of rock that can be mined at a profit. Therefore, there are many variants that can define whether a mineral deposit is profitable or not, such as price, tonnage, or location. Mineral commodities can be classified as metals or non-metals. Metals refer to elements of the periodic table which include base, ferrous, minor fissionable and precious metals. On the other hand, non-metals refer to industrial minerals such as gypsum, diamonds, oil, coal and aggregate. Hydrothermal deposits of economically valuable and recoverable minerals are generally considered scarce, meaning such deposits are very small relative to the total area of earth's surface.

Each of these deposit types is usually considered to represent a distinctive deposit group with common features and in a similar four-dimensional geodynamic context. The formation of deposits of a particular type can vary in time and location, but different deposit types may also form synchronously, but spatially separated within the same broad orogen.

Hydrothermal mineral deposits play a key role in nearly all modern industrial activities.

Mineral Deposit Classification
Igneous	Ore minerals are precipitated directly from a magma.
Sedimentary	Ore minerals are concentrated or formed by sedimentary processes.
Metamorphic	Ore minerals are formed during metamorphism.
Hydrothermal	Ore minerals are precipitated by a hydrothermal solution percolating through intergranular spaces and along bedding planes and fractures in the host rocks.

According to some authors, the hydrothermal solutions can have four origins, although any single volume of hydrothermal solution is commonly a mixture of two or more types:

1. Deuteric fluid derived from magma at a late stage of crystallization
2. Metamorphic fluid derived by progressive removal of hydrothermal fluids during regional metamorphism
3. Meteoric water descending from the surface
4. Fluid formed by the degassing of the core? and mantle
5. Basinal brines are also considered as a possible source of hydrothermal fluids. The fluids are thought to be connate water expelled from sediments with compactions and tectonic forces.

Ore minerals can form at the same time and from the same processes as the host rock, also termed as syngenetic, they can form slightly after the formation of the host rock, perhaps during weathering or compaction, also termed as diagenetic, or they can form much later than the host rock or epigenetic. Host rock is the rock surrounding the ore deposit.

Hydrothermal deposit Subcategory	Known abbreviation	Formation	Principal metals	Host rocks
Porphyry	—	Epigenetic	Cu, Mo, Au	The ore is spatially associated with one or more high-level intrusions of felsic to intermediate composition such as granite, granodiorite or diorite.
Skarn	—	Epigenetic	Cu, Mo, Ag, Au	A skarn deposit is an assemblage of ore and calc-silicate minerals, formed by metasomatic replacement of carbonate rocks in the contact aureole of a pluton.
Volcanogenic massive sulphide	VMS	Syngenetic	Cu, Zn, Pb	The host rocks are mainly volcanic, with the felsic volcanic rocks pointing to a convergent setting (island arc or orogenic belt).
Sedimentary exhalative	SEDEX	Syngenetic	Zn, Pb	These deposits are commonly stratiform and are typically hosted in shale.
Epithermal	—	Epigenetic	Au, Ag	The host rocks can be sheared muscovite granite, small plutons.
Mississippi Valley-type	MVT	Epigenetic	Pb, Zn	MVT deposits are hosted in carbonate rocks, whereas sedex deposits are found within marine shales

== Porphyry Ore Deposits ==
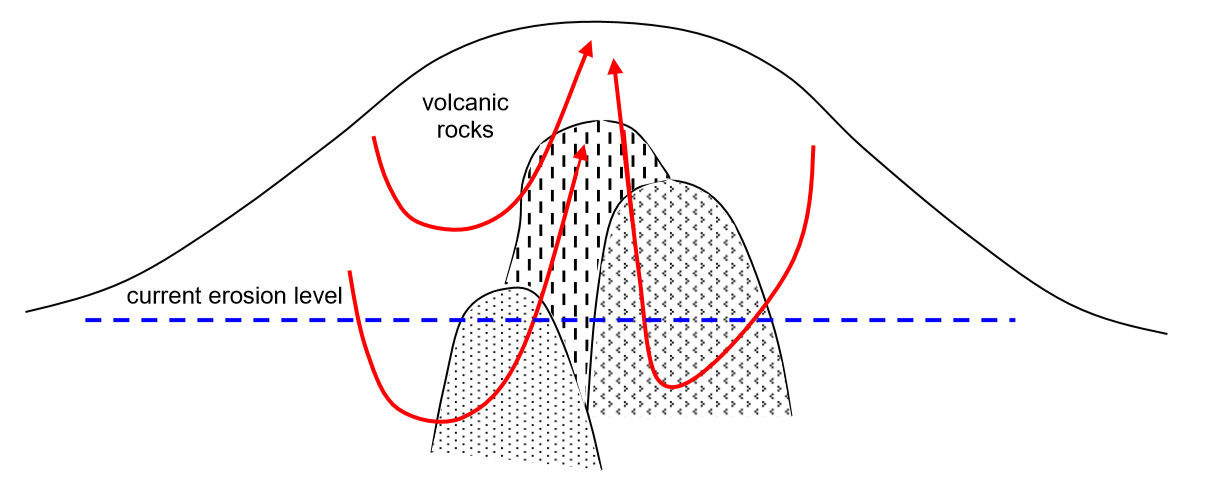
Hypothetical cross-section of an island arc volcano showing intrusions emplaced into the core of the volcano. During the development of porphyry-type ore, one or more intrusions would have generated a separate hydrothermal fluid phase and/or acted as a heat source to drive convection of meteoric waters (see red arrows).

Porphyry deposits account for most of the copper and molybdenum world production, 60 and 95 percent of its supply respectively.

Porphyry-type ore deposits form in hydrothermal fluid circulation systems developed above and around high-level, subvolcanic felsic to intermediate magma chambers and/or cooling plutons. The ore is temporally and genetically related to the intrusions, but did not precipitate directly from the magma.

=== Formation ===
Porphyry mineral deposits are formed when two plate tectonic plates collide in an advanced subduction zone, then cools off reacting with existing rocks and finally forming a copper deposit. The level of displacement is usually shallow at less than two kilometers below surface in an active volcanic area.

An example for a typical arc-island porphyry deposit is described as follows:

1. The formation starts during early volcanism on the seafloor above a subduction zone in an oceanic-oceanic collision zone
2. Then as the magma crystallizes, volatiles such as water, carbon dioxide and sulfur dioxide increase in concentration in the liquid phase of the magma.
3. Eventually, at a very late stage of crystallization, the volatile concentration becomes so great that a separate hydrothermal fluid phase separated from the silicate magma.
4. As the amount of hydrothermal fluid increases, vapour pressure increases.
5. At some point, vapour pressure exceeds the strength of the overlying roof rocks and a volcanic explosion takes place fracturing the overlying rock.
6. The sudden reduction in confining pressure on the remaining magma leads to instantaneous vigorous boiling of the magma as more and more volatiles separate.
7. Consequently, the closing of the fractures in the roof rocks by precipitation of minerals allow confining pressure to increase once again.
8. As time passed, increasingly felsic magmas rise up into the core of the volcano. Some of these later magmas probably erupt on the surface, forming new layers of volcanic rocks that will later be removed by erosion.

Finally, volcanic activity ceased and erosion removed the upper portions of the volcano and exposed the intrusive rocks and stockwork mineralization that used to lie within.

=== Porphyry characteristics ===
Age	Average age of 13 million years, continental and oceanic arcs of Tertiary and Quaternary age.
Size	Amongst the largest in the world, especially porphyry-type deposits.
Location	The 25 biggest porphyry deposits are found in the southwest Pacific and South America.
Host rocks	Ore is associated with one or more subvolcanic intrusions of felsic to intermediate composition such as granite, granodiorite or diorite.
Economic metals	In island arc settings where the host plutons are typically andesitic in composition, the elements of economic interest are mainly copper and gold. In contrast, those that occur in continental orogenic belts are typically rhyolitic in composition and carry copper, molybdenum and gold, and in some cases tin and/or tungsten.
Grade	Commonly low in grade and have relatively low dollar value
Fractures	Ore minerals are generally confined to small veinlets and less common larger veins that formed as fracture fillings in the host rocks. Hydrothermal breccia can often occur, sometimes in the form of pebble dikes.
Hydrothermal alteration	The wallrock on both sides of each veinlet is typically altered to varying degrees. The primary silicate minerals such as feldspar and amphibole are replaced by hydrothermal minerals stable at temperatures of about 400 °C or less such as chlorite, epidote, muscovite and quartz. Alteration assemblages typically include proximal potassic, intermediate phyllic or QSP, and more distal propylitic and argillic alteration. Where veinlets are close together, the zones of alteration around each veinlet overlap, making the whole rock hydrothermally altered.
Mining activity	Bingham Mine, The Chuquicamata deposit, El Teniente deposit, Henderson Mine

== Skarn Mineral Deposits ==
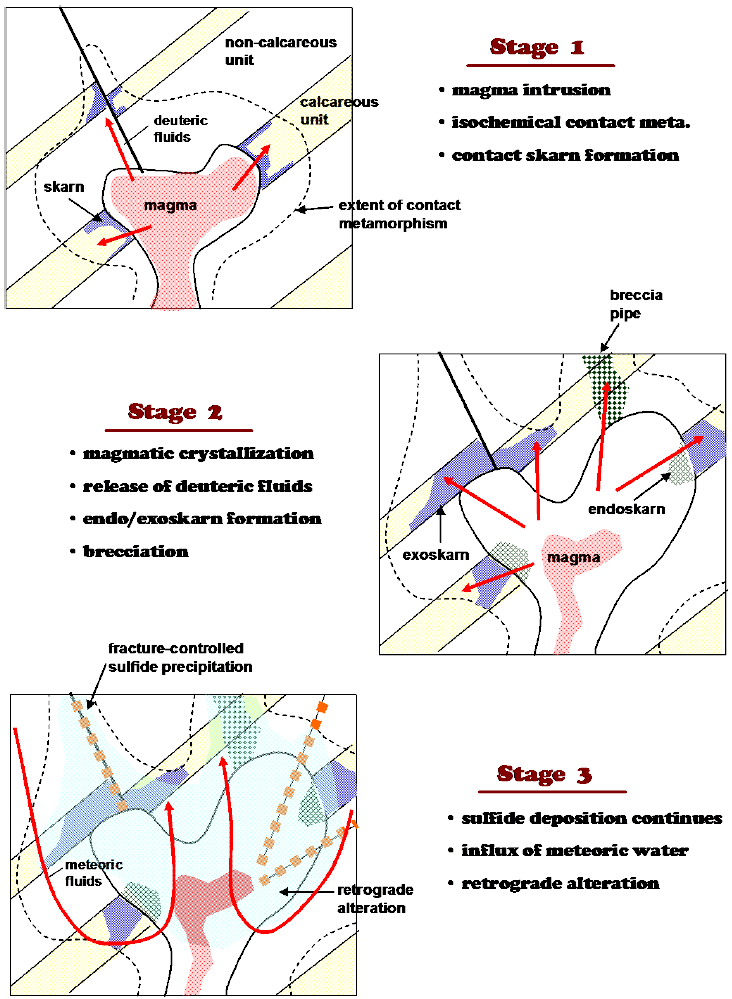
Skarn Formation - three main stages of this mineral ore deposit formation

Skarn Mineral Deposits tend to be small in size but high in mineral grade. Therefore, it is a balance and challenge to find a profitable skarn orebody.

Geologically speaking, a skarn deposit is an assemblage of ore and calc-silicate minerals, formed by metasomatic replacement of carbonate rocks in the contact aureole of a pluton. Typical calc-silicate minerals are garnet, epidote, pyroxene, chlorite, amphibole and quartz – magnesian minerals dominate if dolomite is replaced whereas calcic minerals dominate where limestone is replaced.

Skarn deposits are of economic interest, since they are the source of numerous metals as well as minerals of industrial application.

=== Formation ===
Skarn formation, as illustrated in the figure on the right, can be explained in three stages:

1. Intrusion of a felsic to intermediate magma body rich in volatiles. Contact metamorphism and minor metasomatism, skarn formation, occurs in favorable locations.
2. Continued crystallization of the magma and widespread release of volatiles as a hydrothermal fluid which causes widespread skarn formation and localized brecciation.
3. Characterized by decreasing temperatures and hydrothermal activity, during which sulfide deposition occurs in veins and retrograde alteration is common.

There is a very close spatial association with the granite, the skarn occurs only within marble which is known to be a very reactive rock type, and the skarn has a chemical composition that is unlike any known igneous or sedimentary rock type. Furthermore, various structures such as flexures in the contact or impermeable hornfels beds affected the distribution and ore grade of the skarn zones.

=== Skarn characteristics ===
Size	Relatively small, they tend to be less than 10 million tonnes, although a few large ones exist such as the Mission mine in Arizona, 320 million tonnes.
Economic Metals	Tungsten, tin, molybdenum, copper, iron, lead-zinc and gold ores.
Geologic Features	Nonfoliate rock textures formed by contact metamorphism such as hornfels and marble
Level of Emplacement	Close proximity to a felsic to intermediate pluton of relatively large size. Therefore, shallow depths.
Grade	Ore zones may grade laterally into calcic or dolomitic marble.
Geometry	Equidimensional geometries are most common. Many orebodies are elongate along structural weaknesses such as faults and bedding planes The largest and thickest orebodies tend to occur where carbonate beds lie immediately above gently inclined pluton contacts.
Mining activity	Grasberg and Ertsberg Mines are part of a single mining complex in the glacier-capped mountains of Irian Jaya, Indonesia. Together, they comprise the single largest copper-gold mine in the world, with reserves of 2.8 billion tonnes grading 1.1% Cu and 1.1 g/t Au.

== Epithermal hydrothermal vein deposits ==
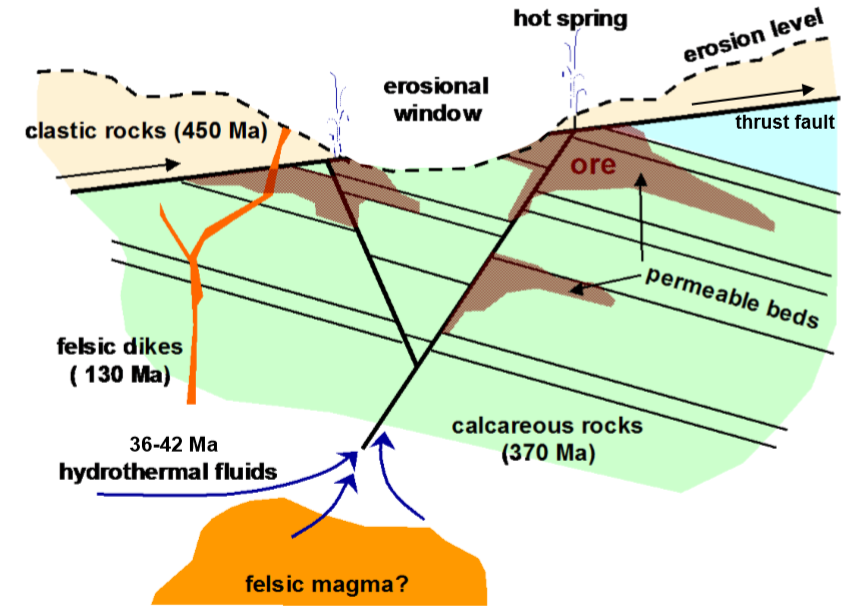
Ascending hydrothermal solutions rich in gold, sulfur and metals were channelled upward along major fracture and fault zones. Fluid that made it to the surface would have vented as hot springs and geysers. Localized erosion through the thrust sheet has formed windows into the underlying ore-bearing rocks. Adapted from Edwards and Atkinson (1985).

Hydrothermal vein ore deposits consist of discrete veins or groups of closely spaced veins. Veins are believed to be precipitated by hydrothermal solutions travelling along discontinuities in a rockmass. They are commonly epithermal in origin, that is to say they form at relatively high crustal levels and moderate to low temperatures. They are epigenetic since they form after their host rocks.

=== Formation ===
Hydrothermal vein deposits fall into three main categories:

1. Felsic pluton association - many veins are spatially associated with felsic plutons, presumably because a pluton is a source of deuteric fluids.
2. Mafic volcanic rock association - many veins and vein packages occur within mafic volcanic sequences such as the greenstone belts of the Canadian Shield.
3. The metasedimentary association.

There are two main possibilities for the origin of the ore, both of which are hydrothermal:

One possibility, the rise of a small body of felsic magma may have led to either the:

- Release of deuteric hydrothermal fluid, or
- The formation of a convective meteoric water system driven by the hot pluton.

Elements were leached from the already solidified portions of the pluton. The fluids would have migrated upward and outward, following fractures in the solidified part of the granite pluton, precipitating ore minerals in veins and altering the wallrocks.

The other possibility, a regional shearing event developed in the crust. Shearing take place at temperatures on the order of 300–400 °C. Thus, the shearing event may have been accompanied by the generation and movement of hydrothermal fluid as the crust was subjected to prograde devolatilization. This fluid might have leached the ore elements from one part of the granite pluton and reprecipitated them in veins in another part of the same pluton, effectively concentrating them.

=== Characteristics ===
Epithermal ore deposits form at shallow depth and are typically tabular (two-dimensional) in geometry.

=== Mining activity ===
Good examples are the gold-silver veins in northwestern Nevada and large ion veins such as the fluorspar veins in the St. Lawrence mine in Newfoundland and the tin-bearing veins that made up the East Kemptville Mine in southwestern Nova Scotia.

== Volcanogenic massive sulfide mineral deposits ==
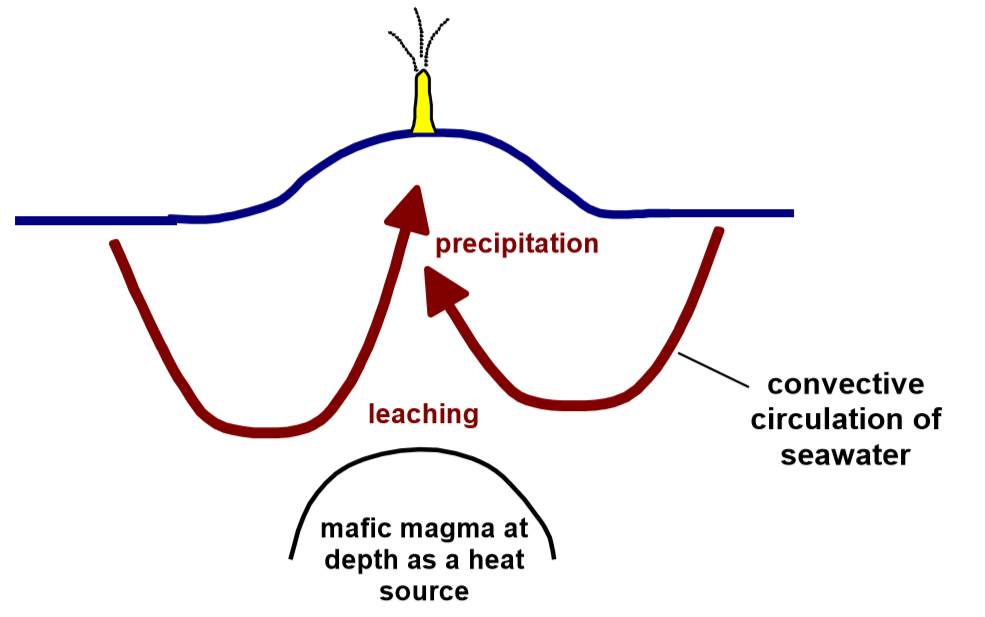
The origin of modern seafloor smokers and ancient volcanogenic massive sulfide deposits: mafic magma at depth (perhaps a few kilometers beneath the surface) acts as a heat source, causing convective circulation of seawater through the oceanic crust.

Volcanogenic massive sulfide (VMS) are responsible for almost a quarter of the world's zinc production while contributing for lead, silver and copper as well. VMS deposits tend to be of great size since they form over a long period of time and have a relatively high grade in valuable minerals. The main minerals in this deposit are sulphide minerals such as pyrite, sphalerite, chalcopyrite and galena.

The term “massive sulfide” deposit refers to any deposit containing more than 50% sulfide minerals. The modifier “volcanogenic” indicates that the massive sulfides are believed to be genetically related to volcanism that was ongoing at the time of sulfide deposition. Thus, VMS deposits are believed to be syngenetic or perhaps slightly diagenetic in age relative to their host volcanic rocks.

=== Formation ===
Deposition of VMS is due to mainly two reasons:

1. Mixing between ascending hot mineral-bearing fluids and the cold descending water.
2. Cooling of the ascending high-temperature solution.

VMS deposits form in zones of extension and active volcanism. The original fluid is mainly cold, alkaline, deficient-in-metals sea water and in some cases it can include a lesser proportion of magmatic fluid.

The main source of the minerals comes from the volcanic rocks through which the sea water flows, taking with it the minerals of the volcanic rock.

The sea water is heated, convection currents are formed and they ascend carrying the minerals which are discharged at the bottom of the sea or immediately below the surface in the form of black smokers.

Magma rises up from the mantle and then cools off in the crust and then releases volatile fluids that contain metals that are eventually transported up to the surface and over time these accumulations become mineral deposits.

As the high-temperature volatile fluids from the magma make contact with low-temperature liquids such as seawater that travel downwards via cracks and faults, producing, due to the large difference in temperature and chemical properties, mineral precipitation, yielding the black colour in the black smokers that end up showing up in the seafloor.

The host rocks are mainly volcanic, with the felsic volcanic rocks pointing to a convergent setting such as an island arc or orogenic belt. Minor sedimentary beds such as chert and slate are found in VMS deposits and they indicate marine deposition, below the wave base.

VMS deposits formed on the seafloor, in the same way that modern seafloor smokers are forming today. The most recent compilations of VMS deposits on land include about 1,100 deposits in more than 50 countries and 150 different mining camps or districts.

=== VMS Characteristics ===
Age	Almost any age can potentially host a VMS deposit, the oldest VMS deposits are 3.4 billion years old.
Size	Individual lenses that are a hundred meters thick and extend hundred meters along strike. The median deposit size is only about 70,000 tonnes.
Types	There are three of types of sulfide ore that can be found in these mineral deposits.: 1. Stringer ore, quartz-chalcopyrite-pyrite veins, are prominent at the stratigraphic base of the ore.; 2. Massive sulfide ore locally shows primary stratiform features such as lamination and grading.; 3. Breccia ore is common near the top of the ore, with sulfide fragments as large as 10 m or more in diameter. Although the breccia may be the result of hydrofracturing or slumping in a seafloor smoker, a tectonic origin such as faulting, cannot be discounted. The ore is Zn-rich at the top and Cu-rich at the base.
Geometry	Typically tabular to lensoid, and range from less than 1 to more than 150 million tonnes. They often occur in clusters.
Economic minerals	Chalcopyrite (Cu), sphalerite (Zn), galena (Pb), silver and gold. The dominant gangue minerals are quartz, pyrite and pyrrhotite. Lenses of barite (BaSO_{4}), gypsum or anhydrite are associated with the sulfides in some deposits.
Mining activity	Flin Flon, Manitoba, Canada, Kidd Creek Mine, Ontario, Canada

== Sedimentary Exhalative Mineral Deposits ==
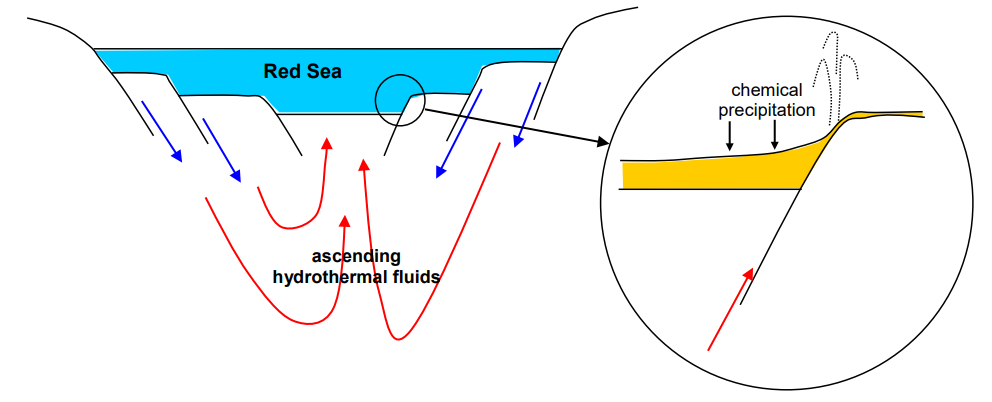
The petrogenetic model for the origin of the Red Sea sulfide deposits. Cold seawater (blue arrows) enters the seafloor via deep-seated fractures. As it descends, it heats up and leaches Si, metals and other solutes from the seafloor basalts.

Sedimentary exhalative (SEDEX) deposits account for 40% of total world zinc production, 60% of lead and a significant proportion of silver. Despite their economic importance however, sedex deposits are relatively rare. A worldwide compilation of sedex deposits indicates that about 70 are known, of which 24 have been or are being mined. The majority is uneconomic to mine because of relatively low grade or unusually fine grain size, making mill recovery rather low.

SEDEX deposits are lead-zinc sulfide deposits formed in intracratonic rift basins by the submarine venting of hydrothermal fluids. These deposits are commonly stratiform, tabular - lenticular and are typically hosted in shale however, sedimentary rocks detrictics or even carbonates could be the host.

=== Formation ===
SEDEX deposits form in sedimentary basins under a regional tectonic extensional environment, under the ocean where cold seawater (blue arrows) is mixed with basin water and through sinsedimentary faults flow towards the bottom of the basin, which are heated by the geothermal gradient, and later ascends by convective currents (red arrows).

Model for the origin of the Red Sea sulfide deposits. Cold seawater (blue arrows) enters the seafloor via deep-seated fractures. As it descends, it heats up and leaches silicon, metals and other solutes from the seafloor basalts.

The source of sulfur can be by bacterial reduction of marine sulfate a process that takes place at the bottom of the basin. It can also come from the washing of the underlying series or by the thermochemical reduction of the marine sulfate. Precipitation of sulfide minerals could be triggered by inorganic precipitation and/or bacterial precipitation.

=== SEDEX Characteristics ===
Size	Average 41 million tonnes Generally take the form of stratiform lenses with maximum thicknesses in the range of just 5 to 20 m.. In contrast, sphalerite tends to be concentrated in the lower grade outer portions of the ore bodies.
Grade	6.8% Zn, 3.5% Pb and 50 g/t Ag
Ore minerals	Zinc, lead, silver, copper, tin and tungsten
Geometry	Form of stratiform lenses with maximum thicknesses in the range of just 5 to 20 meters.
Mining activity	Mt Isa, Australia, Red Dog, USA, Sullivan Mine

== Mississippi Valley type mineral deposits ==
=== Formation ===
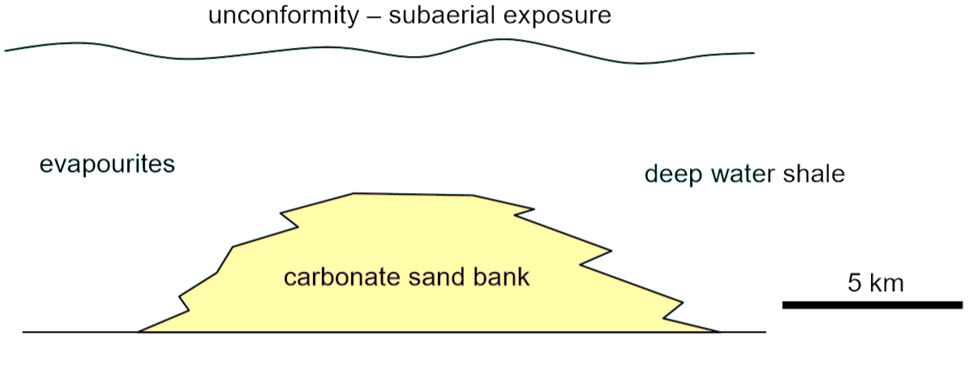
MVT deposits petrogenetic model in general - Carbonate sand banks deposited on a shallow tropical marine platform separated very shallow water evaporite basins (landward) and deeper water muds (seaward).

The deposits are hosted in limestone or dolomite that was deposited on shallow marine platforms in a tectonically stable intraplate environment. As expected in such an environment, volcanic rocks, folding and regional metamorphism are absent as a general rule. MVT deposits commonly lie in close proximity to evaporites and/or beneath unconformities.

Deposits are discordant to bedding on a deposit scale, and are confined to specific stratigraphic horizons. Ore-hosting structures are most commonly zones of highly brecciated dolomite – these structures may be more or less vertical, crossing bedding at high angles, or they may be lensoid in shape extending in the same direction as bedding.

A petrogenetic model to explain MVT deposits in general:

1. The ore minerals fill cavities and fractures in dolomite. Hence, they must be hydrothermal and epigenetic in origin.
2. The hydrothermal fluids involved must have been fairly low in temperature since no rocks in the region are metamorphosed in any way.
3. In addition, the presence of numerous cavities implies that the rocks were so shallow that confined pressure was insufficient to collapse the cavities.
4. Moreover, the sphalerite is generally very pale yellow, meaning that it was a low temperature sphalerite rich in zinc and low in iron.
5. Ore deposition occurred close to the surface, during or soon after karst development.

Deposits are discordant to bedding on a deposit scale.

Ore-hosting structures are most commonly zolinknes of highly brecciated dolomite.

These structures may be more or less vertical, crossing bedding at high angles, or they may be lensoid in shape extending in the same direction as bedding.

=== MVT Characteristics ===
Size	Tend to be less than 10 million tonnes each, and they tend to occur in clusters. As many as 400 individual deposits occur within the upper Mississippi Valley mining district alone.
Grade	Generally fall between 5% and 15% combined Pb plus Zn. Iron sulfides are commonly minor, although pyrite and chalcopyrite can be present and are even abundant in a few deposits.
Host rocks	Limestones and dolomite, deposited on shallow marine platforms in a tectonically stable intraplate environment
Ore minerals	Sphalerite and galena
Mining activity	Pine Point Mine, NWT

Mississippi Valley-type deposits can be compared with the Red Sea deposits, which are modern analogues of ancient sedex deposits, some differences can be made:

- MVT deposits are hosted in carbonate rocks, whereas sedex deposits are found within marine shales
- MVT deposits are believed to form in very shallow water, most likely less than 50 meters in depth, whereas sedex deposits can form under relatively deep marine conditions
- Mineralization is characterized by coarse grain size, cavities, breccia fragments and euhedral crystals. In contrast, sedex mineralization is commonly fine grained and laminated
- MVT deposits are stratabound whereas sedex deposits tend to be stratiform
- Copper and pyrite/pyrrhotite are generally absent or minor in MVT deposits, whereas they can be more abundant in SEDEX deposits.

== See also ==
- Hydrothermal circulation
- Hydrothermal vent
- Mining
- SEDEX
- Porphyry copper deposit
