= Polymetallic ore =

Complex metal ores

Polymetallic ores or multimetal ores are complex ores containing a number of chemical elements, among which the most important are lead and zinc. In addition, polymetallic ores can contain copper, gold, silver, cadmium, sometimes bismuth, tin, indium and gallium. The main minerals that form polymetallic ores are galena, sphalerite, to a lesser extent pyrite, chalcopyrite, arsenopyrite, cassiterite. They are most commonly formed from sulfides but also include oxides.

The three main families of sulfide polymetallic ores are identified as the volcanogenic massive sulphide family, the sedimentary exhalative family, and the Mississippi Valley type family. The classification of lead-zinc deposits in particular has been varied and resulted in a number of different organizations schemes. The term "polymetallic ore" also includes nodules, principally Manganese nodules, that do not form as terrestrial deposits but as concretions on the ocean floor.

Rocks containing polymetallic ores are often altered or formed by hydrothermal processes — chloritization, sericitization and silicification. These deposits are often iron hydroxides containing cerussite PbCO_{3}, anglesite PbSO_{4}, smithsonite ZnCO_{3}, calamine Zn_{4}[Si_{2}O_{7}] [OH]_{2}×H_{2}O, malachite Cu_{2}[CO_{3}](OH)_{2}, azurite Cu_{3}[CO_{3}]_{2}(OH)_{2}. Depending on the concentration of ore minerals, a distinction is made between solid or disseminated ores. Ore bodies of polymetallic ores are distinguished by a variety of sizes (having a length of several m to km), morphology (lenticular bedding deposits, stockwork, veins, nests, complex tube-like bodies) and occurrence conditions (gentle, steep, consonant, secant, etc.).

== See also ==
- Carbonate-hosted lead-zinc ore deposits
- Ore genesis
- Polymetallic replacement deposit
- Flotation of lead polymetallic ores
- Lead-zinc ores
- Resources and reserves of lead
- Concise mining encyclopedia
- Zinc resources and reserves

== Literature ==
- Evans, Anthony, (1992) Ore Geology and Industrial Minerals: An Introduction, Blackwell Science; 3rd edition ISBN 0-632-02953-6
- Guilbert, John M. and Charles F. Park, Jr (1986) The Geology of Ore Deposits, W. H. Freeman ISBN 0-7167-1456-6
