= Phyllic alteration =

Geological process

Phyllic alteration is a hydrothermal alteration zone in a permeable rock that has been affected by circulation of hydrothermal fluids. It is commonly seen in copper porphyry ore deposits in calc-alkaline rocks. Phyllic alteration is characterised by the assemblage of quartz + sericite + pyrite, and occurs at high temperatures and moderately acidic (low pH) conditions.

Hydrogen-ion metasomatism is the process that causes phyllic alteration. While the mineralogy of the rock is altered throughout, texture is preserved and primary porphyry structure (including position of original veins) may still be visible. If a rock undergoes phyllic alteration, then orthoclase feldspar, biotite and various silicates are altered in addition to plagioclase. Plagioclase will be altered to sericite (a fine-grained white mica) by sericitic alteration, and mafic minerals are replaced by quartz. Tourmaline may appear as radiating aggregate or prismatic crystals between the quartz-sericite assemblage. Phyllic alteration is often closely associated with argillic alteration, which occurs at lower temperatures and dominantly affects plagioclase.

== Variation with depth ==
Phyllic alteration typically forms in the base-metal zone of a porphyry system. Alteration assemblages vary with depth and with degree of fluid interaction. In deep environments, the most highly altered areas are veins and thin selvages, or halos, that surround them. The selvages are generally <10 cm in diameter and composed of major sericite and minor quartz. Vein orientation is preserved from original rock, but minerals within are mostly replaced by pyrite. With decreasing depth, selvages widen (10 cm - 1m) and contain more quartz and pyrite.

Outside of selvages, most alteration occurs in replacement of mafic minerals by chlorite and of plagioclase by sericite.
