= Iglesia de Santa Bárbara (Santa Rosalía) =

Historic church in Santa Rosalía, Baja California Sur

Coordinates: 27.3371°N 112.2686°W

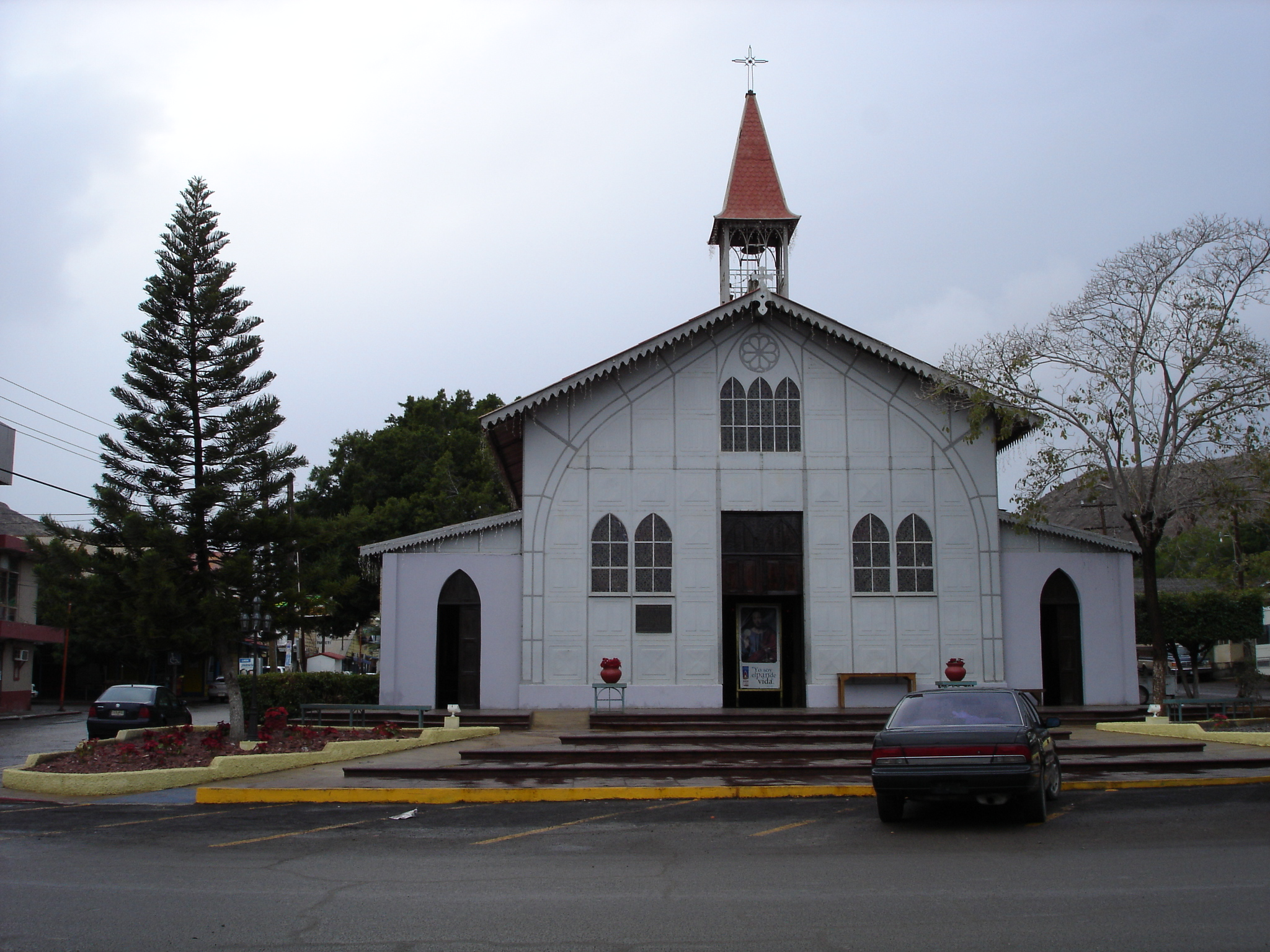
Iglesia de Santa Bárbara in Santa Rosalía, Baja California Sur

Iglesia de Santa Bárbara is a prefabricated iron church in Santa Rosalía, Baja California Sur, Mexico. It is said to be designed by Alexandre-Gustave Eiffel in 1884, and built in 1887. First shown at the 1889 Exposition Universelle of Paris, France, it was moved to Brussels, where it was acquired by the Boleo Mining Company who installed it in Santa Rosalia in late 1897.

== Architecture ==
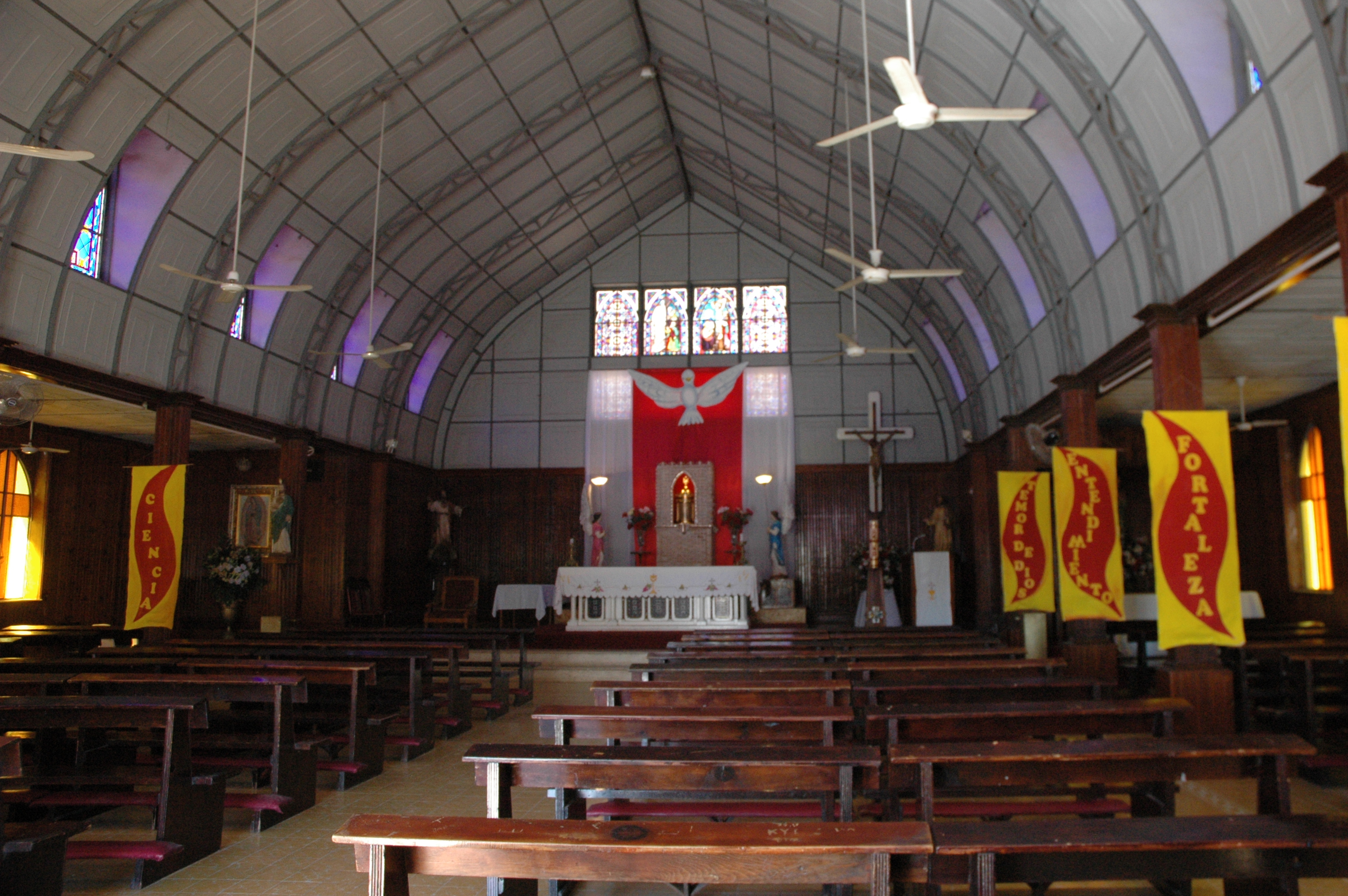
Interior view

It was built entirely of stamped steel sheet squares, and is supported by a formidable steel structure in a sober and austere style. It was later modified in favor of functionality, its former lateral corridors were turned into habitable space using crude masonry, and the building was stripped of several of its original stained glasses. Despite these modifications, it still preserves some of the original 1880s design.

== History ==
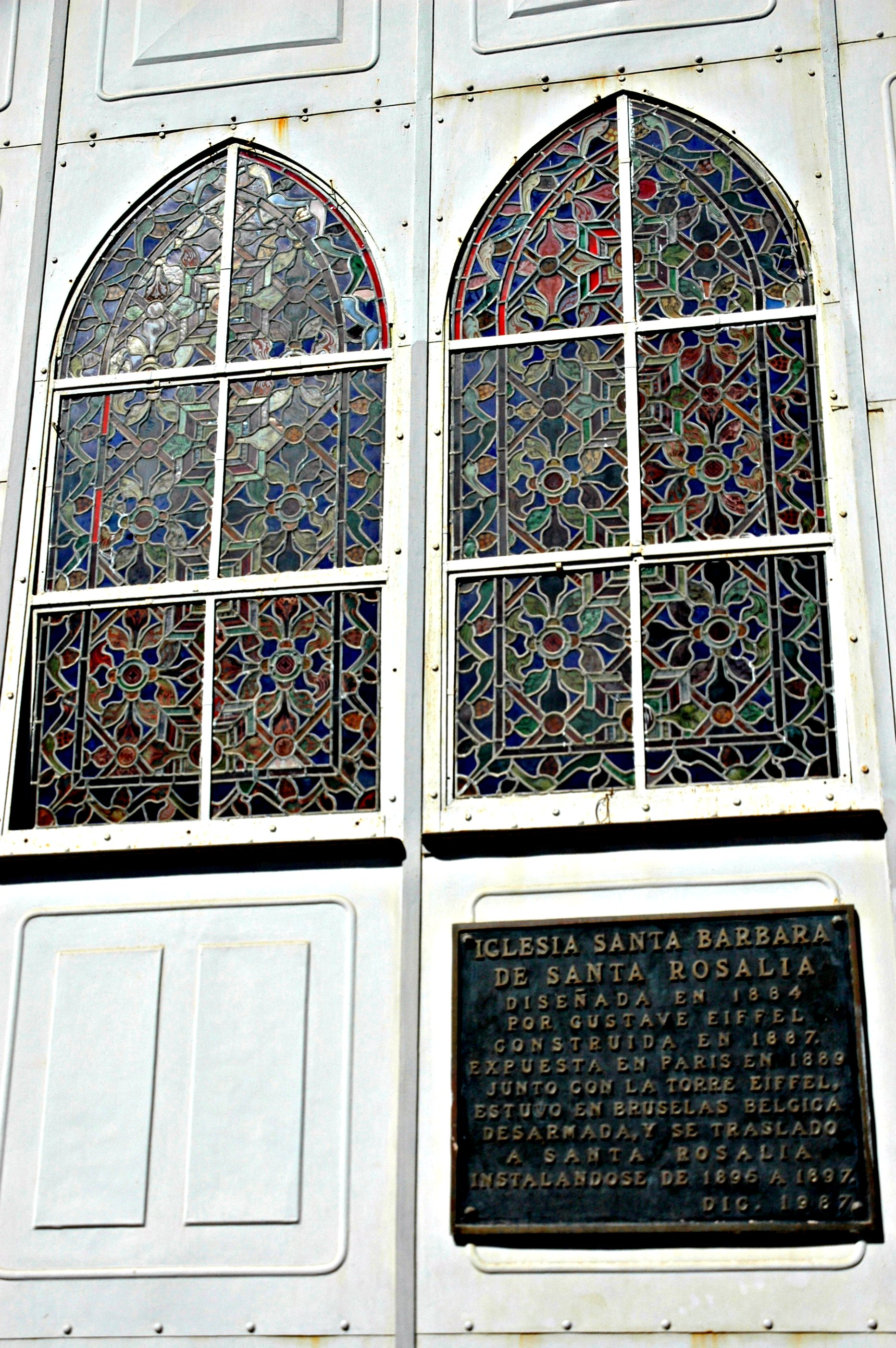
Exterior view of the church's windows and plaque

Tradition credited its design is due to the architect, Eiffel, that it was shown in the 1889 Exposition Universelle, and that it was awarded a prize. It was destined for re-construction in Africa, but was found disassembled in Belgium by Charles Laforgue, the director of the Compagnie du Boleo at Santa Rosalía's Boleo mine, who bought it in 1894 and had it installed in Santa Rosalía three years later.

In the early 1990s American architectural student Angela Gardner visited Santa Rosalía and examined the church. She formed a hypothesis that the church design was from the French architect Bibiano Duclos (1853–1925) rather than Eiffel's firm. with no historical record or blueprint, neither version is confirmed. The disclosure of the historical archives to the public by the Instituto Nacional de Antropología e Historia did not provide additional information. In France, with no evidence, searchers write Santa Barbara is a realization by Duclos.

== See also ==
- Tin tabernacle
