= Geology of Kyrgyzstan =

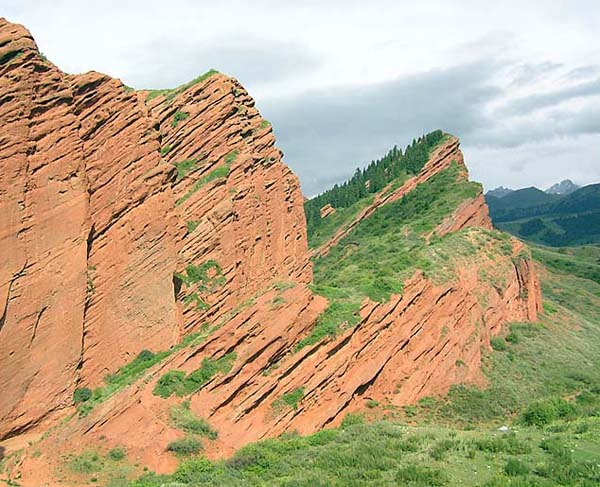
Rock outcrop in Jeti-Ögüz District

The geology of Kyrgyzstan began to form during the Proterozoic. The country has experienced long-running uplift events, forming the Tian Shan mountains and large, sediment filled basins.

== Geologic history, stratigraphy and tectonics ==
The Precambrian tectonic evolution of the region is poorly understood. Geologists infer that the Northern Turkestan domain likely formed along the margin of the Proterozoic Baltica-Siberia continent. The Tarim Block may have belonged to Gondwanaland, based on paleontological evidence. Although paleomagnetic data for the Tien Shan mountains is lacking, some have suggested that the ocean closed to form the Turkestan domain may have been a branch of the proto-Pacific Ocean. The Paleozoic rocks in the Tien Shan mountains are the remnants of accreted island arcs, mainly from the Ordovician onward.

During the Vendian, the Northern Turkestan domain was part of the Kipchak island arc system between the East European and Siberian continent, separated by the Terksey back-arc basin which had originated as a rift basin. The Tien Shan mountains began to form in the Ordovician out of three island arcs amalgamated by the subduction of Terksey oceanic crust beneath the Kungey Arc, Sandalash Arc and subduction of Paleotethys Ocean crust under the Yagnob Arc. The Kyrgyz Block formed in the middle Ordovician with closure of the Terksey Basin and then underwent deformation. Coarse molasse sediments lie unconformably on top of subduction-related granite intrusions and volcanic rocks. North and south of the Terksey Suture, formed during the event, late Ordovician collision-related granites.

Into the Silurian, the Sandalash magmatic arc remained along the southern margin of the Kyrgyz Block. Turkestan oceanic crust was subducated beneath the Sandalash magmatic arc. By the early Devonian, magmatic activity was taking place in the northern Tien Shan mountains, likely as a result of the subducting Turkestan crust. Sedimentation occurred in shallow seas and on the passive margin of the Tarim-Alay Block.

Magmatic activity resumed in the Carboniferous, with spreading in the Turkestan Ocean and renewed subduction under the Kyrgyz Block. By the late Carboniferous, collision between the Tarim-Alay microcontinent and the Kyrgyz Block was underway, emplacing large nappe features with ophiolite deposits on top of the Tarim-Alay basement rocks. Magmatism continued through the Permian in the Tien Shan mountains, accompanied by deformation and the deposition of molasse sediments in different basins.

Structural geologists distinguish a number of tectonic features from the Paleozoic including the Nikolaev Line, Talas-Fergana Fault, Turkestan Suture and Terskey Suture.

=== Mesozoic-Cenozoic (251 million years ago-present) ===
At the start of the Mesozoic, depressions began to develop in the Triassic, accumulating thick, coal-bearing sediments. The East Fergana pull-apart basin aligned along the Talas-Fergana Fault. The western edge of the basin has delta sediments while the center of the basin reflects deep water sediments. Material and fossils continued to accumulate into the Jurassic as the units were folded.

A shallow water basin covered the region in the Cretaceous, leaving behind salt water fauna west of the Talas-Fergana fault. Alluvial deposits mark the edges of the saline lake and Cretaceous deposits accumulated up to 500 meters thick. The lake became a shallow intracontinental sea, lasting into the Cenozoic. Lagoon deposits accumulated through the Eocene, until the sea began to retreat in late Paleogene times. The retreat was brought on with the collision of India with Asia around 50 million years ago. Cretaceous-Eocene sedimentary rocks are up to two kilometers thick in the Fergana Basin. The Oligocene, the entire region had shifted to lagoon and continental deposition.

To the east of the Fergana Range, there are no Cretaceous or Paleocene sediments. Continental sediments accumulated there beginning in the Eocene, formed clay, siltstone and sandstone, interbedded with thinner layers of gypsum, marl, conglomerate and limestone in river valleys formed in the central Tien Shan Mountains in the Oligocene and Miocene. These deposits range widely from several meters thick to several kilometers. They reach their greatest thickness of four kilometers in Fergana, Atbashi and Naryn basins. Tien Shan mountain rocks show no signs of folding from the Cretaceous through the Paleogene and lie with an angular unconformity atop basement rocks.

Tectonic activity rapidly resumed in the late Pliocene, leading to erosion of continental sediments into intermontane basins into the Quaternary. Folding developed into the Quaternary in the Tien Shan mountains as global changes in climate brought on the Pleistocene ice ages. Most ridges in the mountain range are asymmetric anticlines bounded by reverse and thrust faults. Folding and thrusting is often oriented toward major basins like the Fergana, Chur or Tarim basins.

== Seismic activity ==
Due to tectonic activity since the Pliocene, Kyrgyzstan has intense seismic activity on a regular basis. There have been more than 11 earthquakes magnitude 6 or greater on the Richter scale since 1865. The most activity centers on the Kyrgyz Ranges, Kungey Ranges and East Fergana region.

== Natural resource geology ==
Kyrgyzstan is notable for significant deposits of antimony and mercury, such as the Chauvay, Kadamzhai and Khaydarkan deposits. These are examples of quartz-fluorite-antimonite-cinnabar (also known as jasperoid type deposits), while others are quartz-dickite-cinnabar or magnesian-carbonate-cinnabar (or listvenite)_ types. The primary types of deposits are common at the contact between Carboniferous limestone and overlying Silurian shales and Devonian sandstone nappe formations. Listvenite deposits are typically associated with serpentine mélange. Contact metamorphism skarn deposit gold, hydrothermal gold, pegmatite hosted tin, cassiterite-quartz and iron ore in Proterozoic slates are also common together, with smaller amounts of zinc, aluminum, lead, vanadium and uranium.

Oil and gas are found in commercial quantities in the Fergana Basin in Jurassic, Cretaceous, Paleogene and Neogene sedimentary rocks. The oil is low in sulfur and the natural gas is dry with up to 72 percent methane. The South Fergana Basin, the Uzgen Basin, Kavak Basin and Southern Issyk Kul Basin all host coal deposits from the Triassic and Jurassic formed under continental conditions, with 70 percent hard coal.
