= Jasperoid =

Type of rock

Jasperoid is a rare, peculiar type of metasomatic alteration and occurs in two main forms; sulfidic jasperoids and hematitic jasperoids. True jasperoids are different from jaspillite, which is a form of metamorphosed chemical sedimentary rock, and from jasper which is a chemical sediment.

Sulfidic jasperoids are typical examples of silica-sulfide metasomatism of dolomites, and are found in Nevada, Tennessee, Australia and Iran. They are hard, dense purple-black rocks with considerable content of pyrite. The bodies in Nevada are quite thin (seldom greater than 8 m) and stratabound.

== Hematitic jasperoids ==
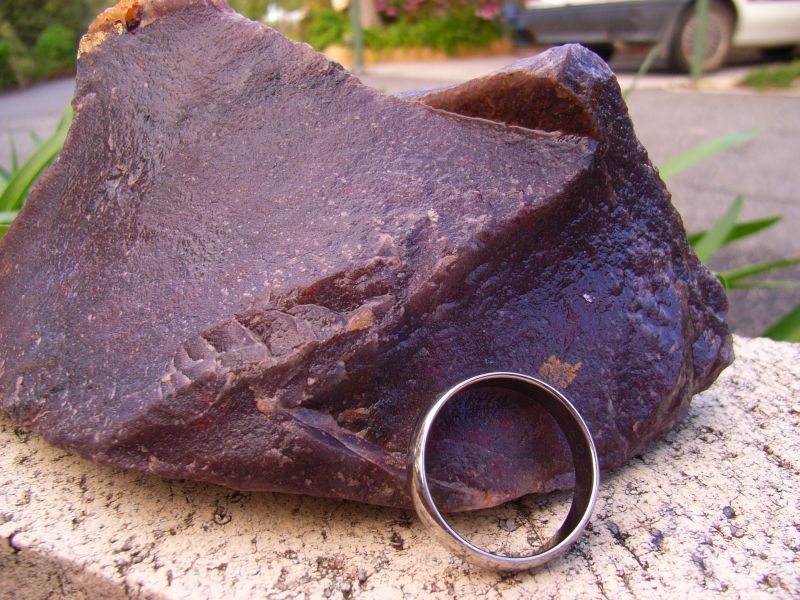
Hematitic silica alteration 'jasperoid', Yarlarweelor mine, Glengarry Basin, W.A.

Hematitic jasperoids are examples of advanced silica-hematite alteration, and are known only from the Proterozoic rocks of the Glengarry Basin in Australia. These jasperoids are hard, purple to dark purple rocks composed primarily of amethyst quartz and fine disseminated hematite and some magnetite.

While contentious, these jasperoids are thought to form by extreme alteration of wall rocks within a shear zone, and may occur in sediments, andesites, trachytes and basalts. These bodies are often discordant to stratigraphy and are quite podiform in nature. The bodies in the Glengarry Basin are up to 120 m thick and over 3 km in length. These jasperoids are an important source of gold ore within the region.

Some hematitic jasperoids may be sourced from metamorphosed and altered jaspillite, and are located above areas identified as submarine basalt vents. These, therefore, may represent a type of exhalite chert or spilite. These are subordinate in volume to the shear-hosted forms and are usually quite thin (less than 3 m).

=== Conditions of metasomatism ===
The formation of hematitic jasperoids is considered to be the product of highly oxidised metasomatism of the wall rocks to a shear zone. The presence of carbonate alteration, talc-carbonated high-magnesian basalts and ultramafic rocks and the remnant mineralogy being restricted to hematite, silica, and sulfides indicates oxidising fluid chemistry. Relict volcaniclastic textures in some jasperoids indicate that aluminosilicates have been replaced pervasively by silica + hematite.

Transitional forms and poorly developed analogs are present in some gold camps within the Yilgarn craton where deep, reduced methane and carbonate bearing alteration fluids mix with shallower oxidised fluids, resulting in purple-pinkish carbonate flooding alteration within basalts and ultramafic rocks. One example of this is the Widgiemooltha Dome, where carbonated hematite-bearing siliceous basalts containing native gold, arsenopyrite, nickeline and gersdorffite are encountered in the footwall of the Miitel nickel mine.

== Geographical distribution ==
True jasperoid is found in dolomitic strata in mining areas of the United States, including Washington, Utah, Colorado, Idaho, and Nevada, and within dolomitic limestone sequences in Azerbaijan, Iran, Iraq and Turkey.

Hematitic jasperoid is only found within the Glengarry basin, Western Australia, although it probably represents an end-member state of a variety of alteration and metasomatism styles found elsewhere.
