= Jaspillite =

Banded mixture of hematite and quartz

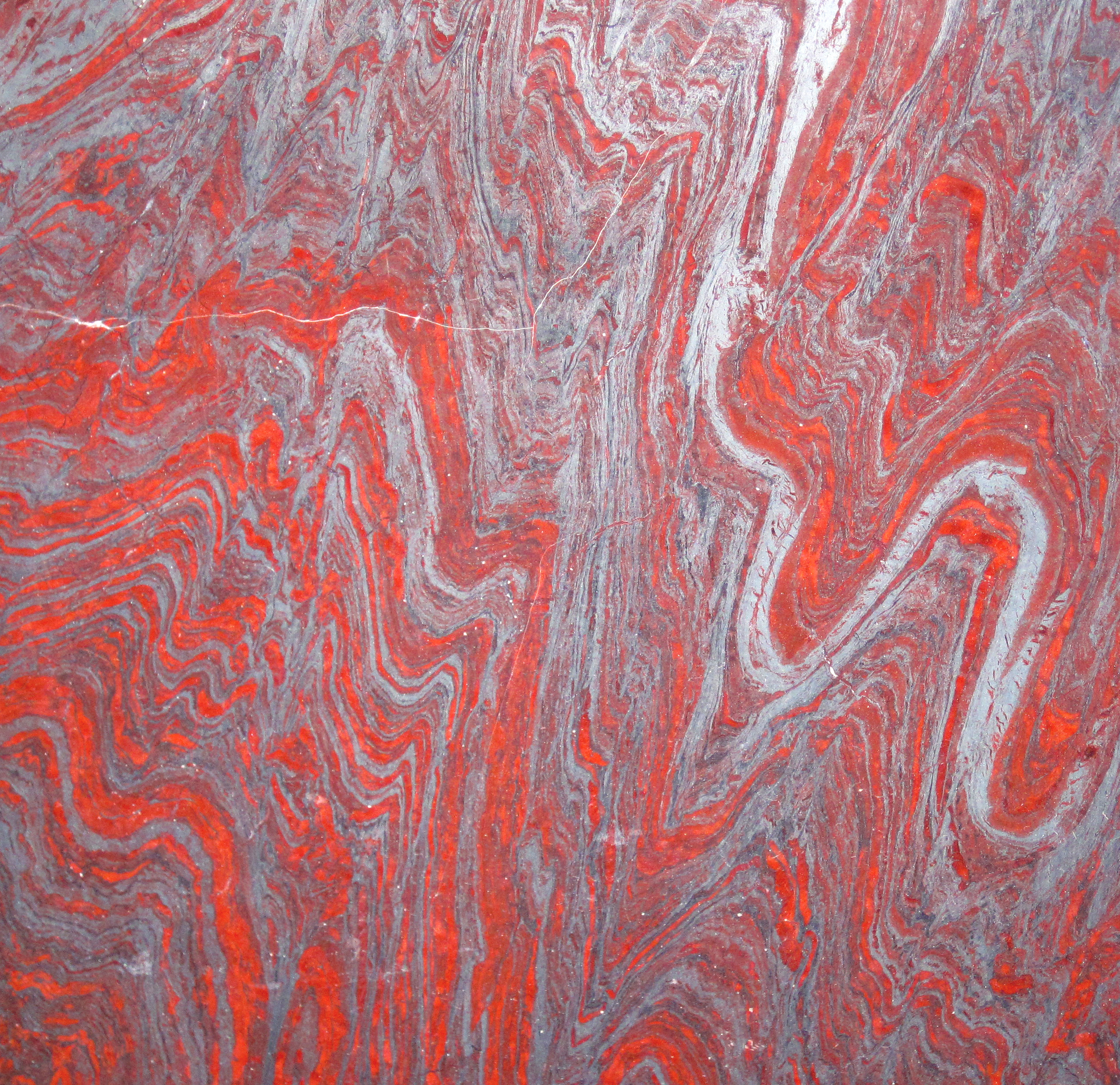
Jaspilite sample from Minas Gerais, Brazil

Jaspillite (or jaspilite), also called itabirite or jasper taconite, is a chemical rock formed similar to chert, but is generally quite iron-rich. Jaspillite is typically a banded mixture of hematite and quartz common in the banded iron formation rocks of Proterozoic and Archaean age in the Canadian Shield.

Jaspillite is also formed as exhalative chemical sediments in certain lead-zinc ore deposits, and as a hydrothermal alteration facies around submarine volcanism. It is used as a gemstone.
