= Argillic alteration =

Argillic alteration is hydrothermal alteration of wall rock which introduces clay minerals including kaolinite, smectite and illite. The process generally occurs at low temperatures and may occur in atmospheric conditions. Argillic alteration is representative of supergene environments where low temperature groundwater becomes acidic.

Argillic assemblages include kaolinite replacing plagioclase and montmorillonite replacing amphibole and plagioclase. Orthoclase is generally stable and unaffected. Argillic grades into phyllic alteration at higher temperatures in an ore deposit hydrothermal system.

Advanced argillic alteration occurs under lower pH and higher temperature conditions. Kaolinite and dickite occur at lower temperatures whereas pyrophyllite and andalusite occur under high temperature conditions (T > 300°C). Quartz deposition is common. Alunite, topaz, zunyite, tourmaline, enargite and tennantite may also occur. Greisen alteration is similar.

== See also ==
- Sericitic alteration
