= Pneumatolysis =

Obsolete geologic term for magma emitting gasses

Pneumatolysis is an obsolete geologic term for magma emitting gasses that alter surrounding rock or crystallize minerals. Pneumatolysis is now considered a type of hydrothermal interaction.

== See also ==
- Metasomatism
