= Santa Rosalía, Baja California Sur =

Santa Rosalía
- City
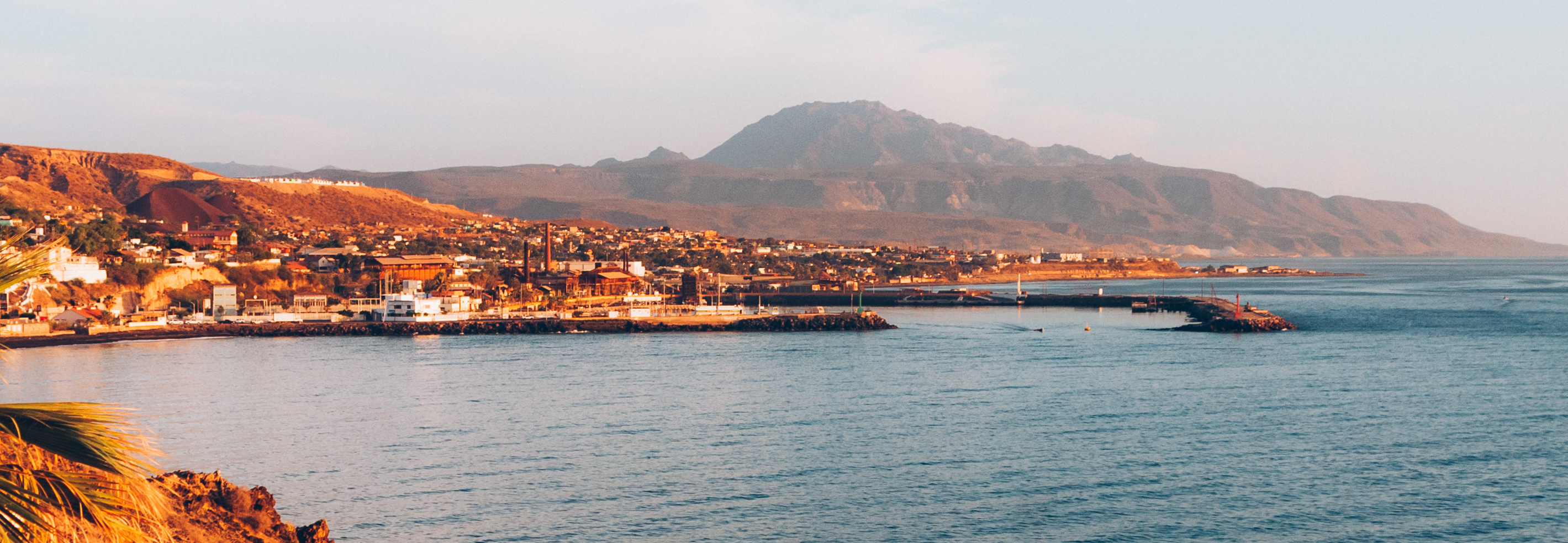
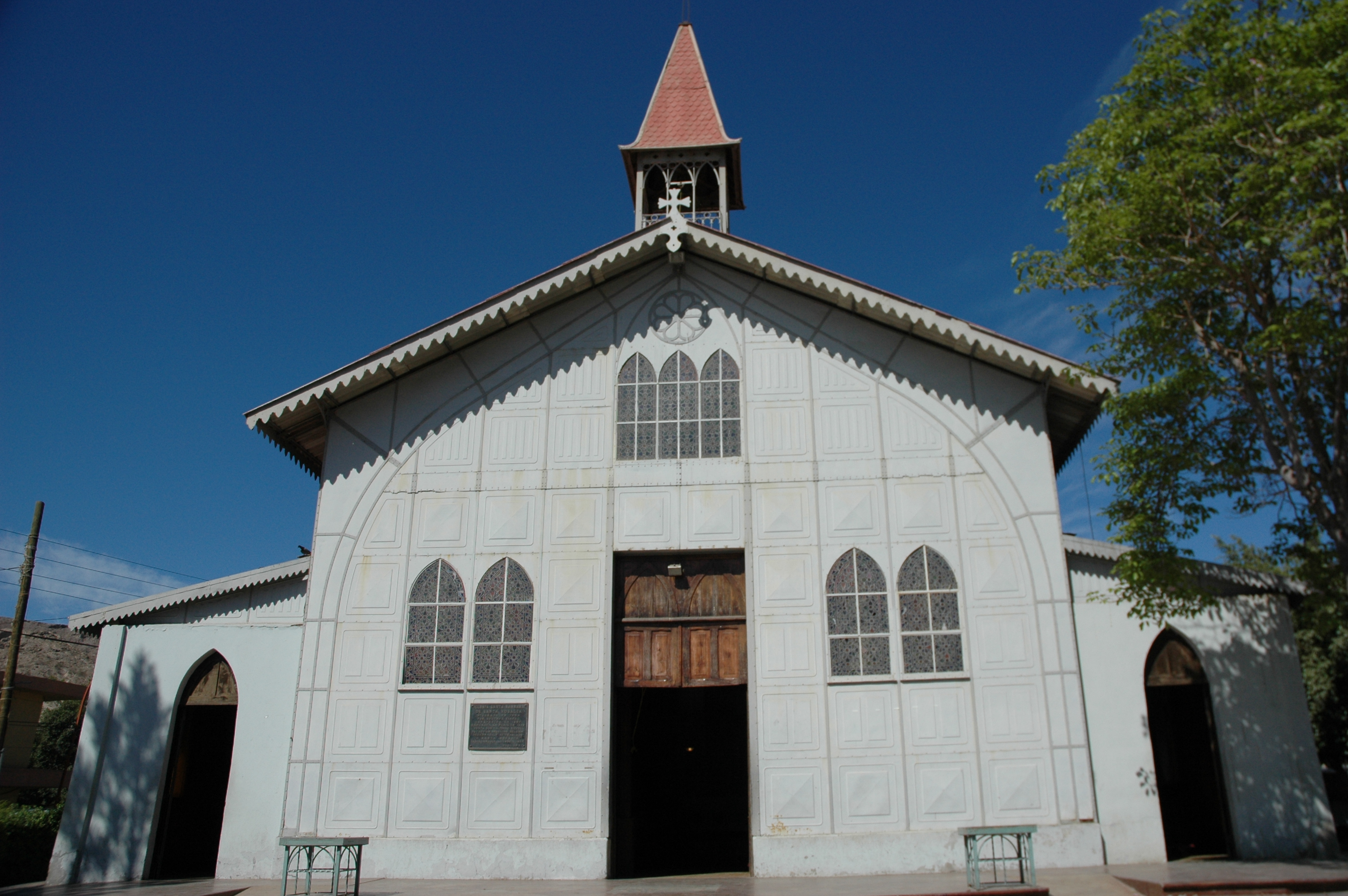
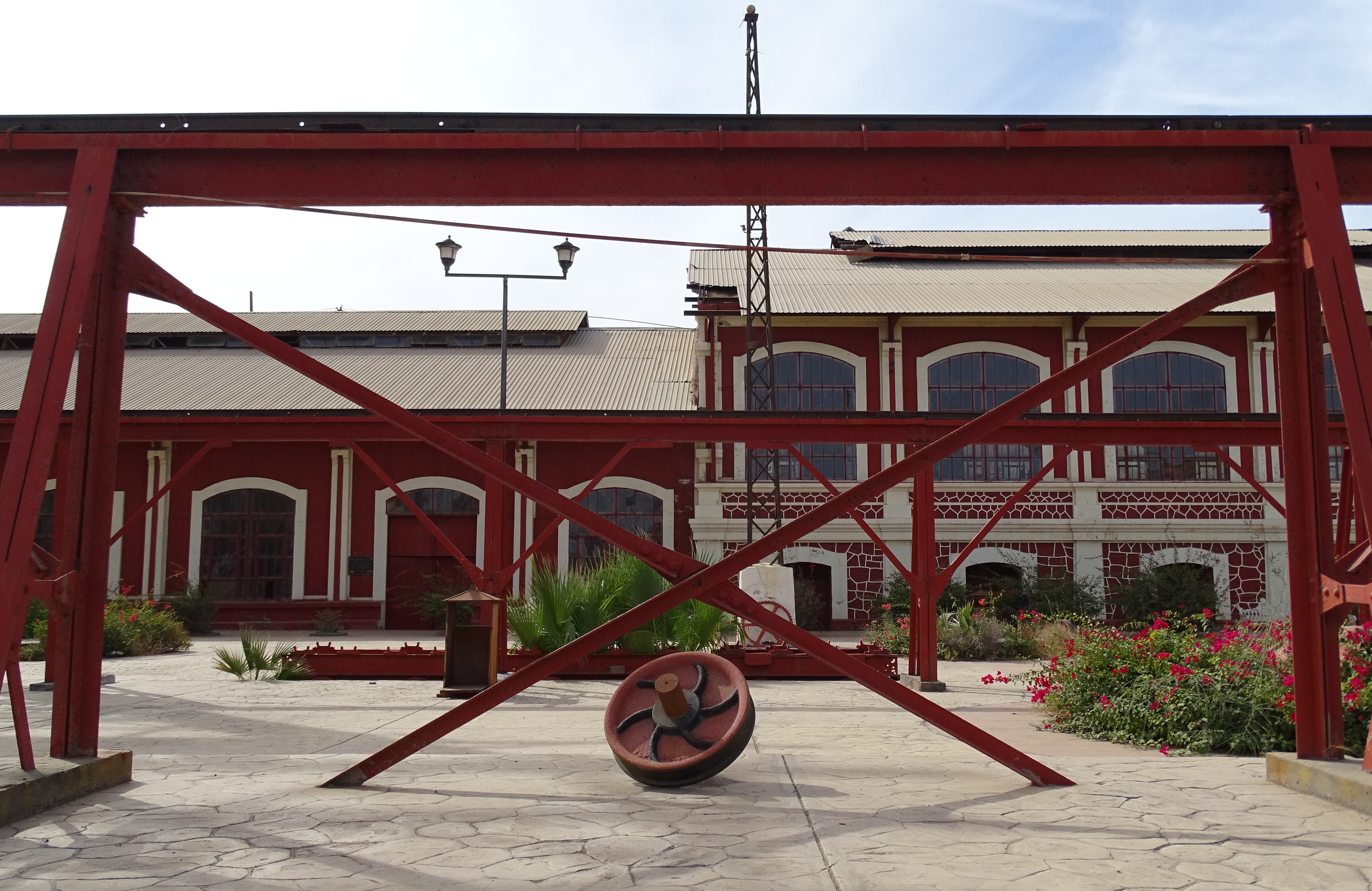
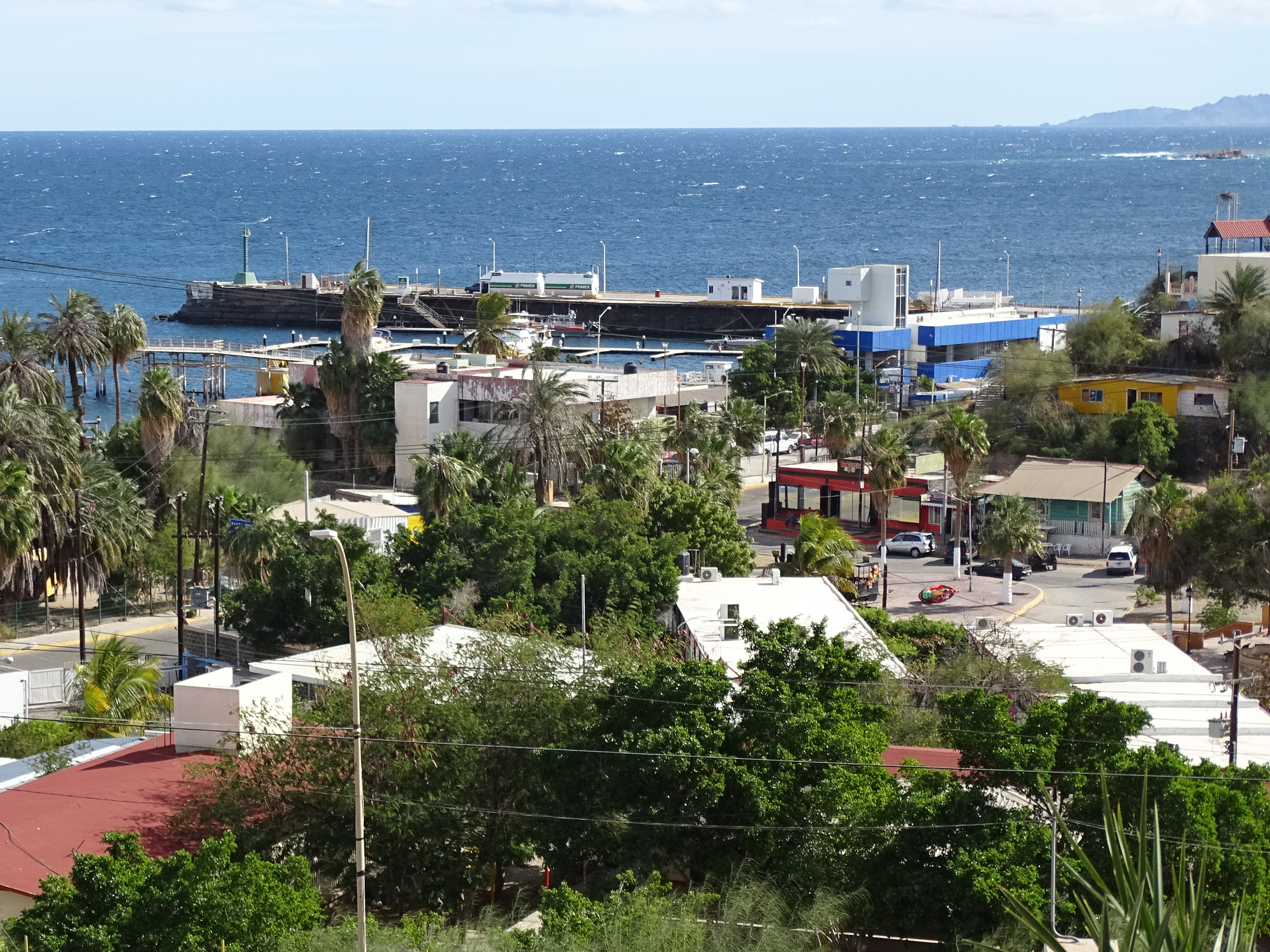
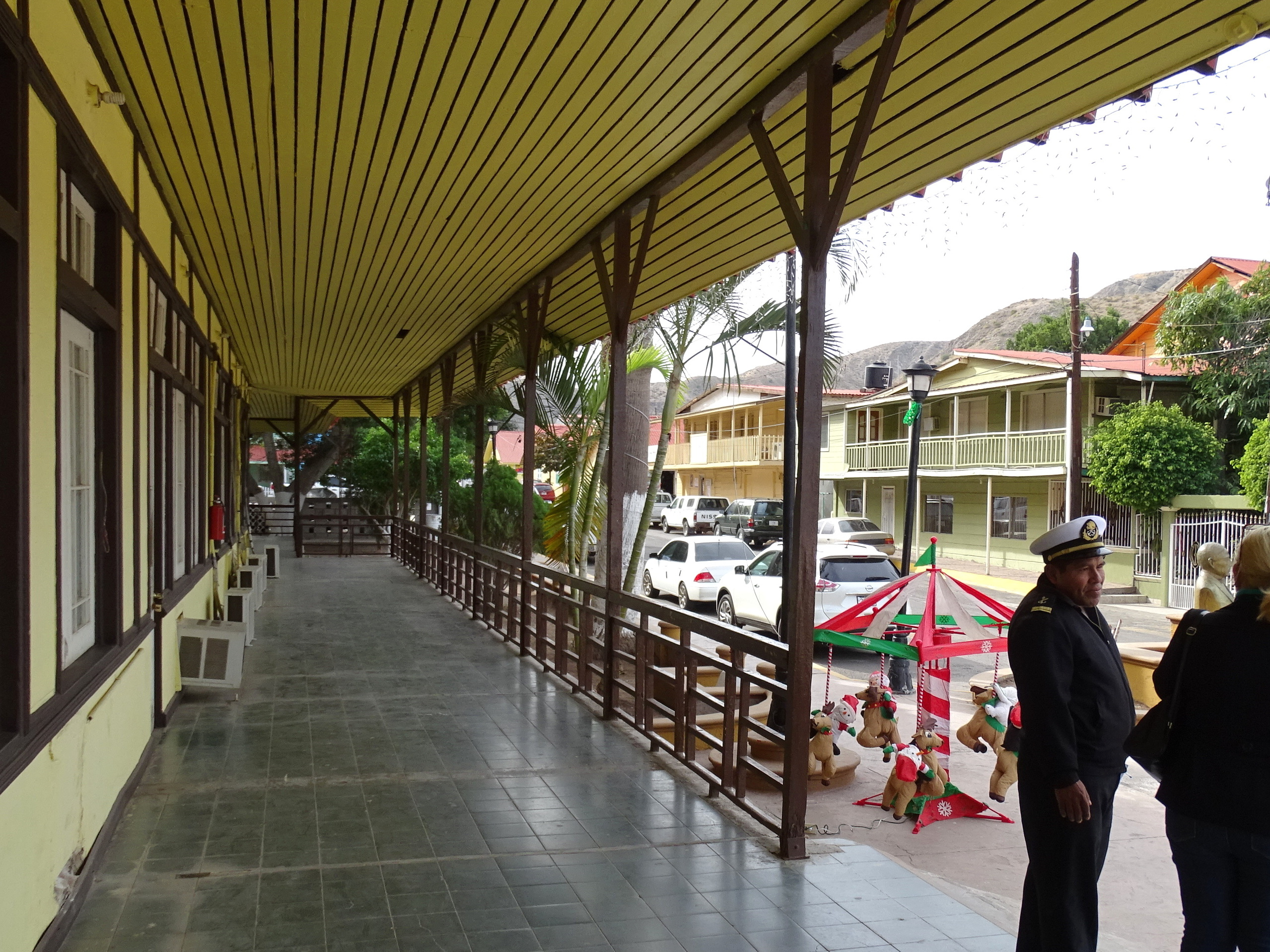
- Top: view of Santa Rosalía from the Gulf of California; middle: Santa Bárbara Church (left) and Boleo Industrial Plant (right); bottom: view over the Harbor (left) and City Hall (right).

- Location in Mexico Santa Rosalía (Mexico)
- Coordinates: 27°20′20″N 112°16′01″W
- Country: Mexico
- State: Baja California Sur
- Municipality: Mulegé
- Elevation: 59 ft (18 m)

Population (2020)
  - Total: 14,357
- Time zone: UTC−07:00 (Zona Pacífico)
- Area code: +52 615

Santa Rosalía is a city and municipal seat of Mulegé Municipality, in Baja California Sur, situated along the Gulf of California. Located on the east coast of the Baja Peninsula, the town had a population of 14,357 inhabitants in 2020. The city was founded as a company town by the French Compagnie du Boleo in 1884, which established the local copper mines. Today the city is a popular tourist destination. In 2023, Santa Rosalía was designated a Pueblo Mágico by the Mexican government, recognizing its cultural and historical importance.

== History ==
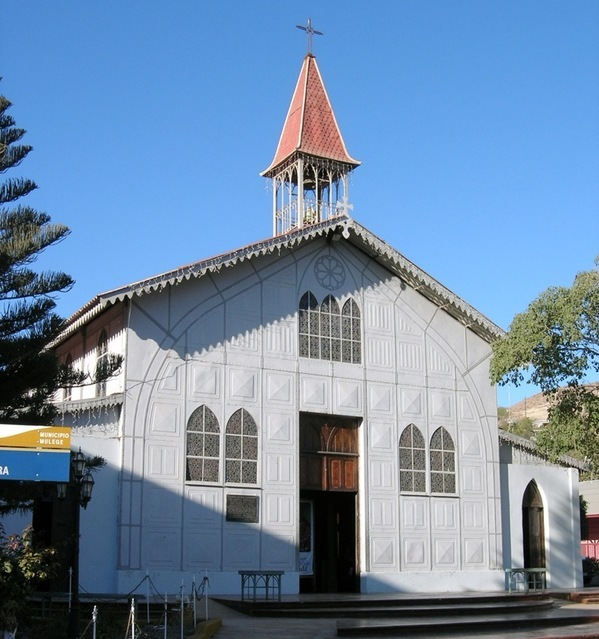
Santa Bárbara Church was designed by famed French architect Gustave Eiffel for the 1889 Paris Exposition and brought to Mexico in 1897.

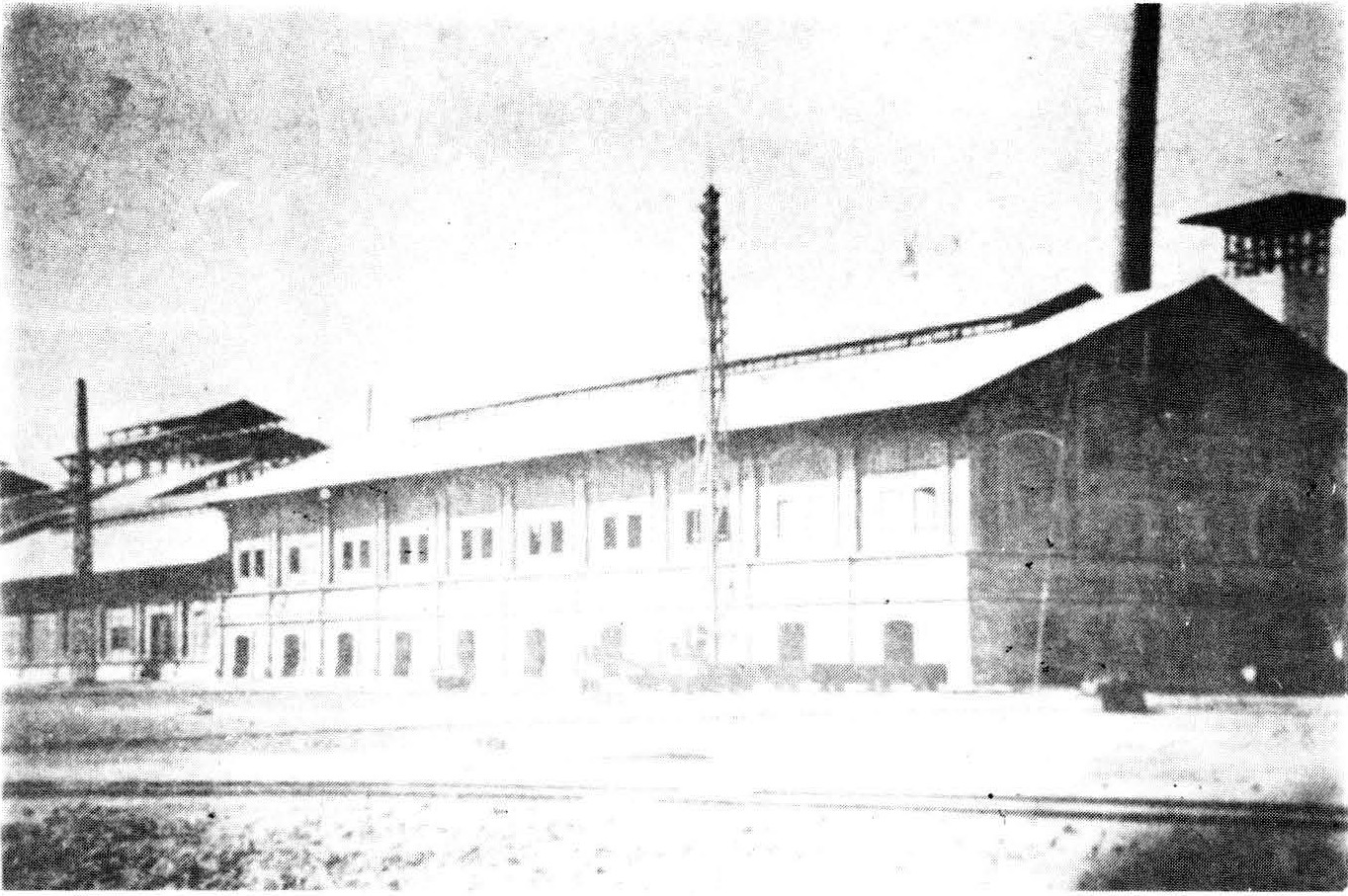
El Boleo copper mines in 1890

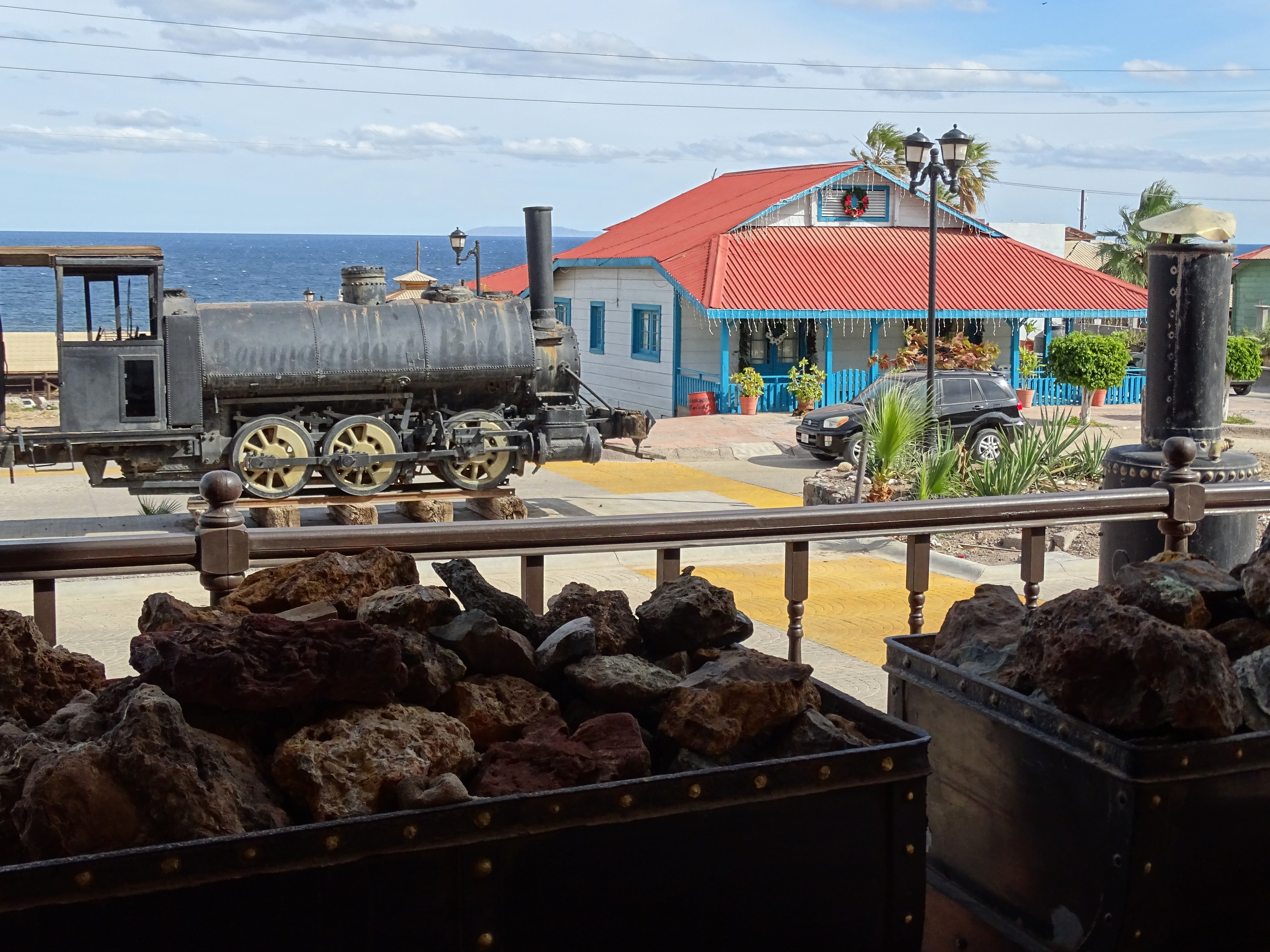
View of the Compagnie du Boleo train monument

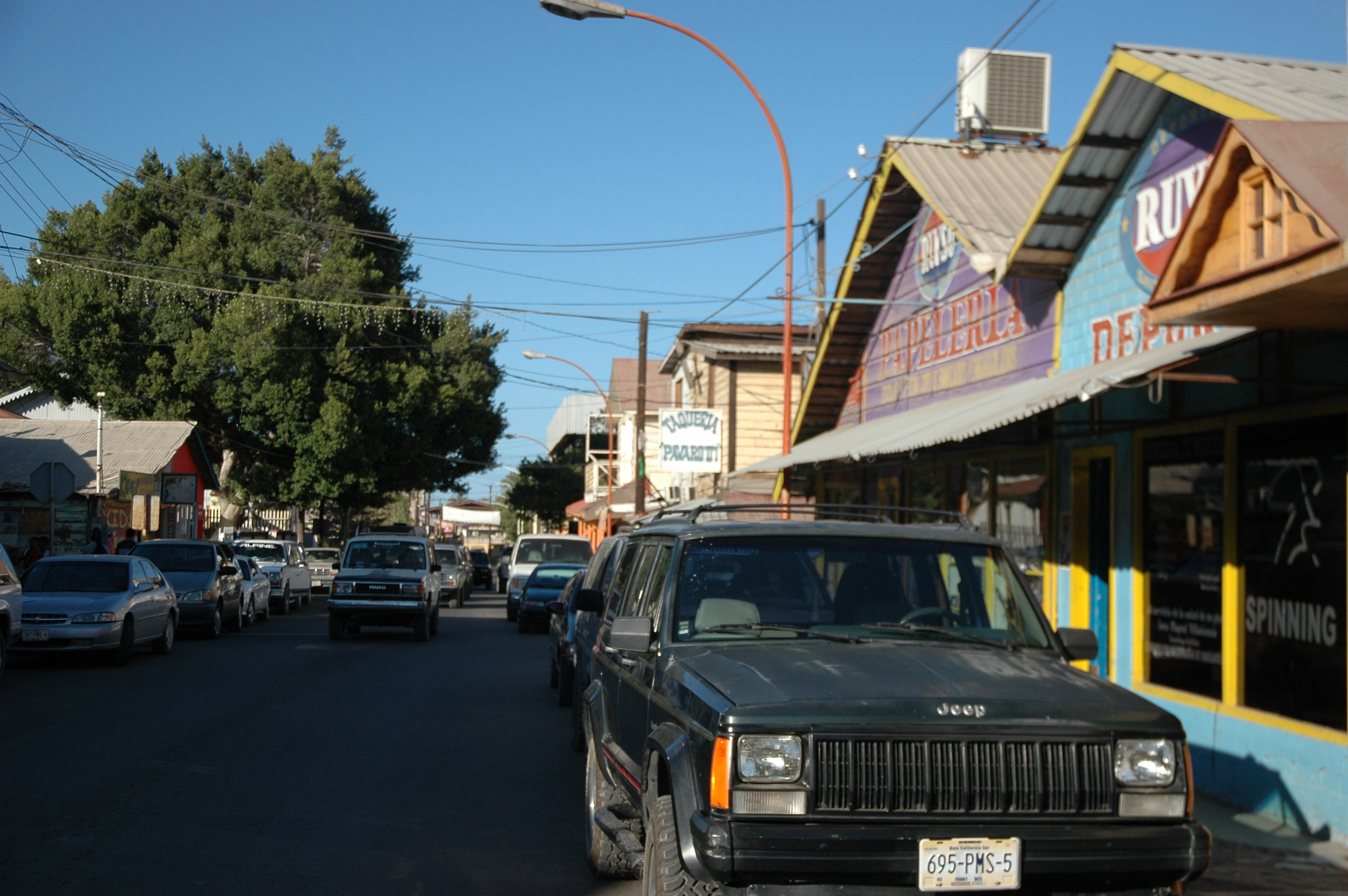
French tropical architecture

The town was named after Saint Rosalia, although the mission is not located by the town, but is in original location Mulegé, about 100 km (62 mi) south.

Santa Rosalía boasts French influence, particularly in its architecture. The French Compagnie du Boleo founded the town in 1884 and exploited copper mines there until they closed in 1954. They built houses and installed the metallic Iglesia de Santa Bárbara.

Unlike many other mining sites, the industrial facilities which are located in the very middle of the town, were never dismantled. Of particular interest are the reverberatory furnace and the metallurgical converter, although they are currently not accessible by the public due to safety concerns. Old locomotives, mining equipment and machinery are visible everywhere, much preserved as ornate. The main mining company building (La dirección) have been reconverted into the city hall and its offices into an industrial museum.

=== El Boleo copper mines ===
The Boleo Mine is an unusual sediment-hosted copper-cobalt-zinc-manganese ore deposit. Seven large manto ore deposits have been identified.

El Boleo was mined by Compagnie du Boleo, a French company, from 1885 until 1954. To prevent the economic collapse of Santa Rosalia and surrounding communities, a Mexican state-owned company (CMSRSA) assumed control and reopened the works using basically the same (rather archaic) equipment and process used by the French. The government funded operation was never profitable, and the mine was finally closed in the 1980s, when lower-grade ore and old technology made continued operation impractical.

=== Modern mining efforts ===
Baja Mining, a Canadian firm, began intermittent exploration of the El Boleo mine and subsequently undertook an effort to reopen El Boleo. Baja Mining estimated that the property contains a resource of 534 million tons of ore, containing 0.59% Cu, 0.051% Co, and 0.63% Zn. Baja also hoped to produce byproduct manganese. Baja Mining, in partnership with a Korean Consortium began developing the $1.6 Billion project in 2010.

In 2012 however, construction cost overruns reported by Baja Mining threatened to halt or delay construction of the project. Majority ownership interest and control of the project was transferred to the Korean consortium, in return for funding the reported cost overruns. On January 26, 2015 Minera y Metalurgica del Boleo obtained its first copper production from the process of crushing, leaching, extracting and electrowinning in its mine-metallurgic project "El Boleo".

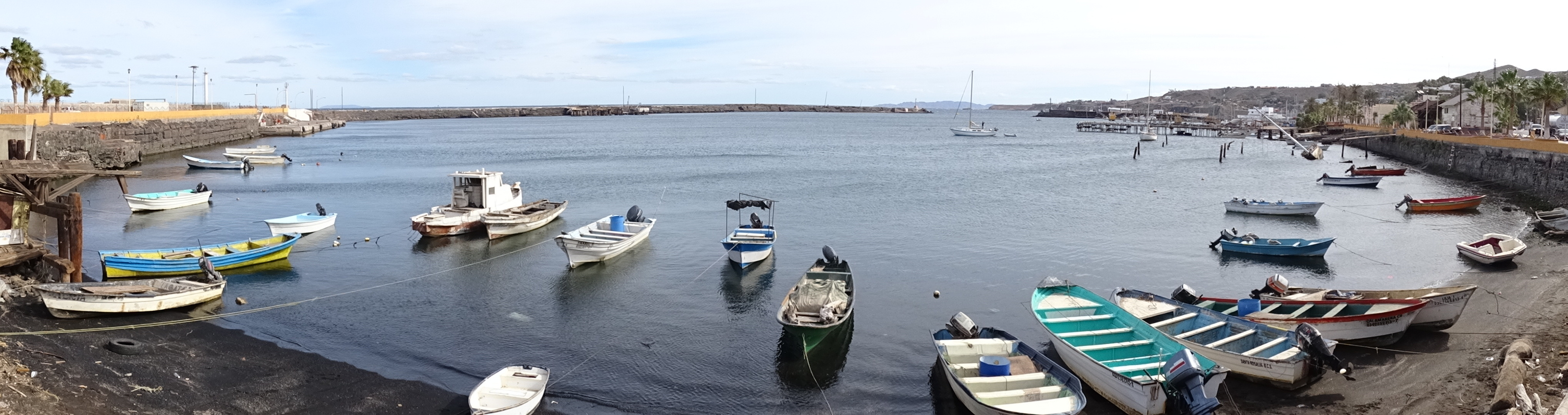
View of the harbor in the waterfront, December 2015

== Geography ==
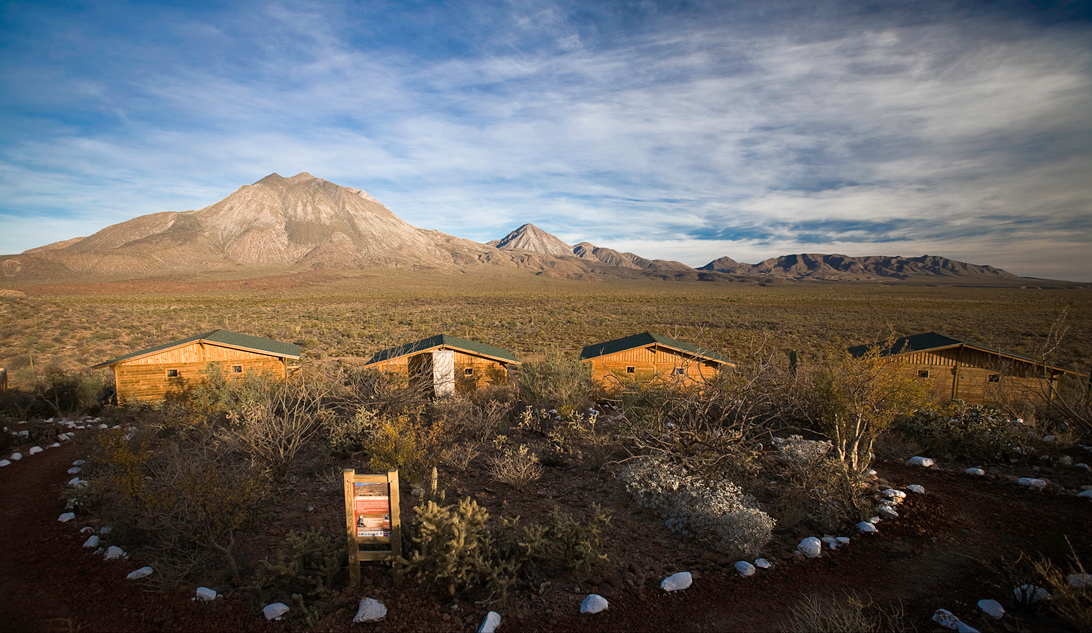
Tres Vírgenes

Santa Rosalía is a port city, and a regular ferry connects with Guaymas, Sonora, on the other side of the Gulf of California. At the Palo Verde Airport daily flights are available from Guaymas and twice a week from Hermosillo, Sonora. It is located along Mexican Federal Highway 1.

=== Climate ===
Due to its location in the warm Gulf waters, which are considerably warmer than Pacific waters in the winter, the town is the northernmost (and thus closest to the US border) year-round warm locale on the main peninsular highway.

Climate data for Santa Rosalía, Baja California Sur (1991–2020)
Month	Jan	Feb	Mar	Apr	May	Jun	Jul	Aug	Sep	Oct	Nov	Dec	Year
Record high °C (°F)	34.0 (93.2)	35.0 (95.0)	35.0 (95.0)	38.0 (100.4)	42.5 (108.5)	46.0 (114.8)	48.0 (118.4)	43.4 (110.1)	42.6 (108.7)	41.5 (106.7)	38.5 (101.3)	33.0 (91.4)	48.0 (118.4)
Mean daily maximum °C (°F)	21.5 (70.7)	22.4 (72.3)	24.9 (76.8)	27.3 (81.1)	30.1 (86.2)	33.8 (92.8)	35.4 (95.7)	35.6 (96.1)	34.4 (93.9)	31.4 (88.5)	25.9 (78.6)	21.7 (71.1)	28.7 (83.7)
Daily mean °C (°F)	17.3 (63.1)	18.0 (64.4)	20.2 (68.4)	22.3 (72.1)	25.0 (77.0)	28.8 (83.8)	30.6 (87.1)	31.2 (88.2)	30.0 (86.0)	26.7 (80.1)	21.6 (70.9)	17.6 (63.7)	24.1 (75.4)
Mean daily minimum °C (°F)	13.0 (55.4)	13.6 (56.5)	15.4 (59.7)	17.3 (63.1)	20.0 (68.0)	23.8 (74.8)	25.9 (78.6)	26.7 (80.1)	25.6 (78.1)	22.0 (71.6)	17.3 (63.1)	13.6 (56.5)	19.5 (67.1)
Record low °C (°F)	3.5 (38.3)	2.5 (36.5)	6.5 (43.7)	9.0 (48.2)	10.0 (50.0)	14.0 (57.2)	15.0 (59.0)	13.0 (55.4)	11.5 (52.7)	11.5 (52.7)	10.0 (50.0)	6.0 (42.8)	2.5 (36.5)
Average precipitation mm (inches)	5.0 (0.20)	8.1 (0.32)	1.9 (0.07)	0.2 (0.01)	0.1 (0.00)	0.1 (0.00)	3.3 (0.13)	23.8 (0.94)	58.0 (2.28)	9.2 (0.36)	5.2 (0.20)	6.4 (0.25)	121.3 (4.78)
Average precipitation days (≥ 0.1 mm)	1.1	1.0	0.4	0.2	0.1	0.1	0.9	1.7	2.5	0.8	1.0	1.0	10.8
Average relative humidity (%)	60	58	55	50	52	55	58	62	62	58	58	55	57
Source: Servicio Meteorológico Nacional (humidity 1981–2000)

== Demographics ==
The 2020 census showed a population of 14,357 persons.

The population was 10,190 in 1990.

== See also ==
- Volcanoes of east-central Baja California
- Porfirio Díaz
