= Polymetallic replacement deposit =

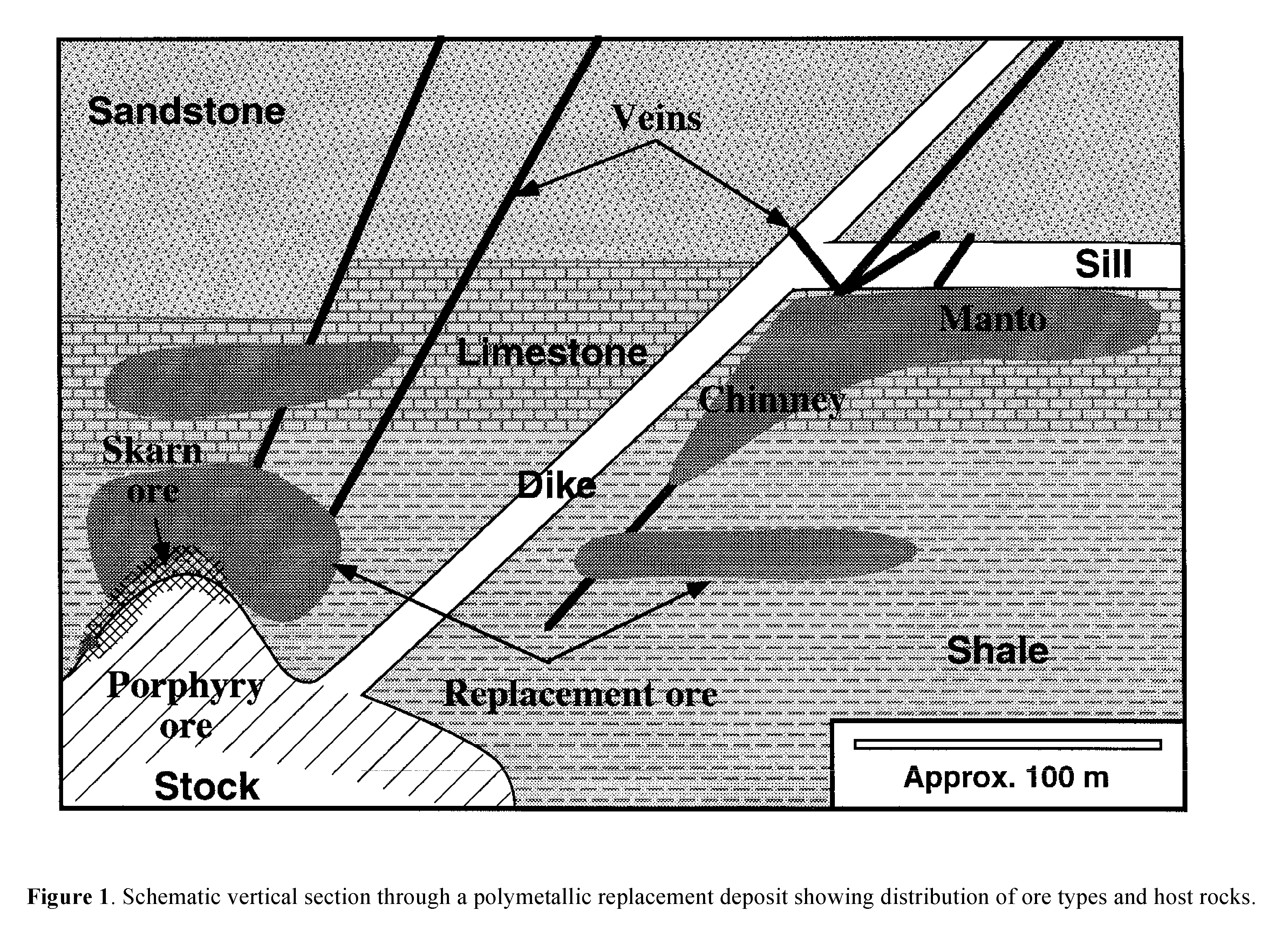
Cartoon cross-section showing manto ore deposits (USGS)

A polymetallic replacement deposit, also known as carbonate replacement deposit or high-temperature carbonate-hosted Ag-Pb-Zn deposit, is an orebody of metallic minerals formed by the replacement of sedimentary, usually carbonate rock, by metal-bearing solutions in the vicinity of igneous intrusions. When the ore forms a blanketlike body along the bedding plane of the rock, it is commonly called a manto ore deposit. Other ore geometries are chimneys and veins. Polymetallic replacements/mantos are often stratiform wall-rock replacement orebodies distal to porphyry copper deposits, or porphyry molybdenum deposits. The term manto is derived from the Spanish word manto, meaning "mantle" or "cloak".

Although similar in orebody geometry, host-rock lithology, and the presence of lead and zinc, carbonate hosted lead zinc ore deposits, also known as Mississippi Valley type, are considered a different type of ore deposits. Mississippi valley type ore deposits lack silver and gold mineralization, are lower temperature, and are not associated with nearby igneous intrusions.

== Mineralogy ==
Polymetallic replacement deposits are significant sources of copper, gold, silver, lead, manganese, and zinc.

The metallic ore minerals are mostly in sulfides, such as galena, sphalerite, enargite, and argentite. Gangue minerals include quartz, pyrite, rhodochrosite and barite.

The mineralogy changes with distance from the intrusive rock. Closest to the intrusion is the copper-gold zone; next is the lead-silver zone, then the zinc-manganese zone.

== Classification ==
Manto ore deposits are defined by a strict stratigraphic control on their distribution, generally within a porous formation within a structural trap site. They are distinct from other copper ore bodies in that they are not associated with shear zones, and an intrusive link to manto deposit formation is not conclusively proven, but is often inferred.

== Genetic model ==
The genetic model of manto formation is debated, but consists of the following broad principles;

- The source of ore within manto deposits is considered to be interformational, from a sedimentary source within an adjacent sedimentary basin, or from ore fluids driven off from a granite intrusive.
- The transport of copper into the manto deposit position was likely hydrothermal, either a metamorphic solution or copper-bearing hydrothermal solutions generated by intrusive granites.
- The trap where the ore materials concentrated is typically a coarse-grained member of a carbonate formation, and the manto is usually sited in a stratigraphic or structural pinch-out of this formation although it is now thought that hydrocarbons may have assisted in the migration of metals into favorable trap sites.

== Morphology ==
Manto deposits were first described in great detail in Chile, where they sit within sedimentary strata overlying large granitic intrusions, in regions adjacent to porphyry copper deposits.

In Chile, the arid climate and deep regolith development, tended to favor preservation of chalcocite-malachite-azurite assemblages in the manto deposits, leading workers to believe that they were weathered equivalents of primary chalcopyrite deposits of porphyry-copper derivation.

However, recent work suggests that there may be primary chalcocite and bornite formed within degraded petroleum within trap sites, with copper precipitating from solution by reduction in contact with the reduced carbon. Thus, manto deposits need not be the weathered equivalents of primary chalcopyrite.

Manto deposits may be formed in proximity to intrusives, for instance in the La Providencia mine, Mexico, a porphyry stock is the feeder for some twenty mantos as the pipe intersects favorable layers in the sedimentary sequence. However, these manto deposits are analogous to skarn deposits, and in some cases terminology may be misused.

In many instances, manto/ polymetallic replacement/ carbonate replacement deposits can be considered as the distal part of a continuum with skarn deposits.

== Example manto deposits ==
Selection of manto-type copper deposits in Chile.
- Atacocha, Peru
- Bingham Canyon, Utah (peripheral to the porphyry Copper)
- El Boleo Mine, Santa Rosalia, Baja California Sur, Mexico
- Charcas, San Luis Potosi, Mexico
- Gilman, Colorado (zinc)
- Laurium, Greece
- Leadville mining district, Colorado (silver, lead, zinc)
- Magma Mine, Superior, Arizona (copper)
- Naica, Chihuahua, Mexico
- Park City, Utah (silver)
- Pioche, Nevada (silver)
- Platosa, Mexico
- Santa Eulalia, Mexico
- Clark, Arizona
- Tintic, Utah, (silver)
- Tombstone, Arizona

== See also ==
- Ore genesis
- Polymetallic ore

== Literature ==
- Evans, Anthony, (1992) Ore Geology and Industrial Minerals: An Introduction, Blackwell Science; 3rd edition ISBN 0-632-02953-6
- Guilbert, John M. and Charles F. Park, Jr (1986) The Geology of Ore Deposits, W. H. Freeman ISBN 0-7167-1456-6
