= Propylitic alteration =

Rock's chemical alteration geological process

Propylitic alteration is the chemical alteration of a rock, caused by iron and magnesium bearing hydrothermal fluids, altering biotite or amphibole within the rock groundmass. It typically results in epidote–chlorite–albite alteration and veining or fracture filling with the mineral assemblage along with pyrite.

The alteration occurs due to hot fluids that have a high sodium ion composition. This is typically due to fluids that have lost potassium ions in potassic alteration and gained sodium ions.

== See also ==
- Metasomatism
