= El Boleo =

Copper mine in Baja California Sur, Mexico

El Boleo is a copper-cobalt-zinc-manganese deposit located in the northern portion of the port city of Santa Rosalía, Baja California Sur in Mexico. It includes a historic open pit copper mine, as well as underground workings. Mining began in the 1860s, and continued, off and on, until the 1980s. The property is currently under development by a consortium of Korean companies led by Korea Resources Corporation. Preliminary underground mining began in 2012. The project cost $1.75 billion, and mining began in the first half of 2014. Copper production began on January 17, 2015. The mine has an estimated life of 22 years.

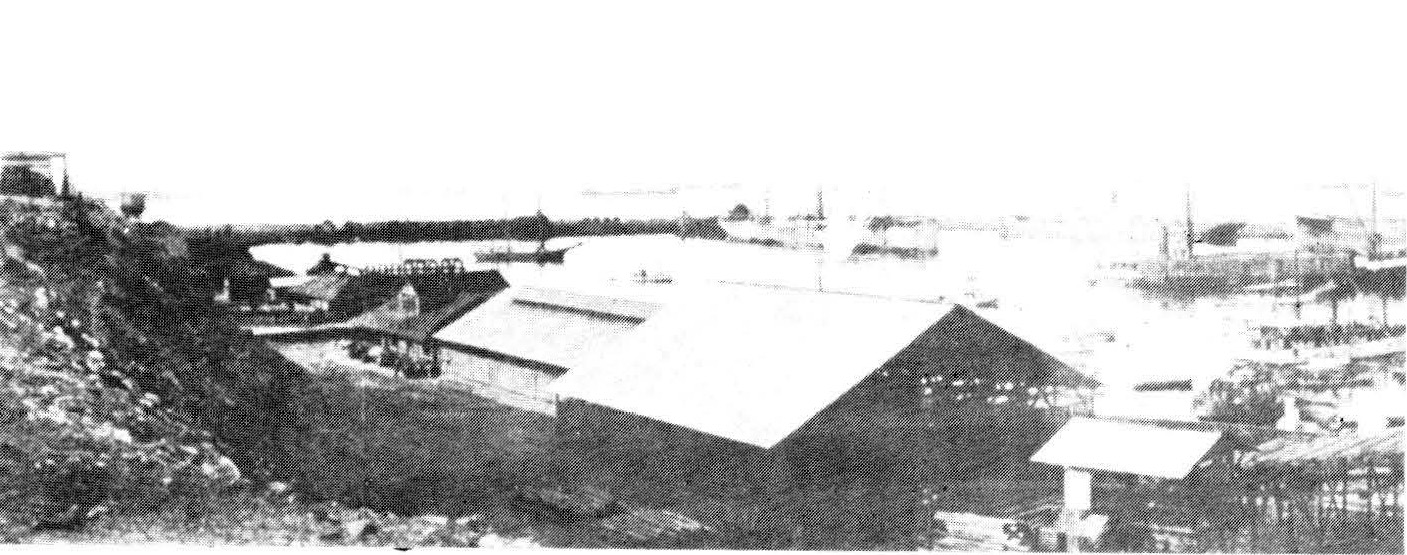
Mill. El Boleo.

== History ==
=== Early history ===
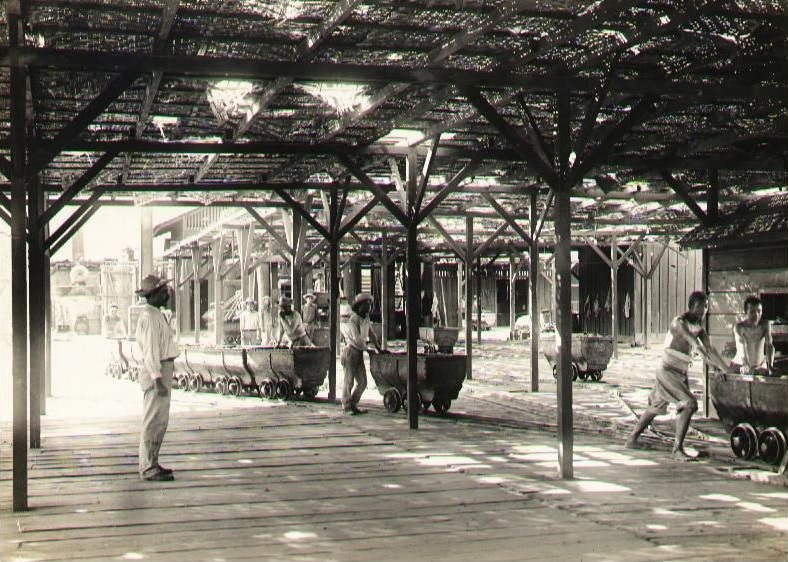
Yaqui Indians and Chinese carrying copper.

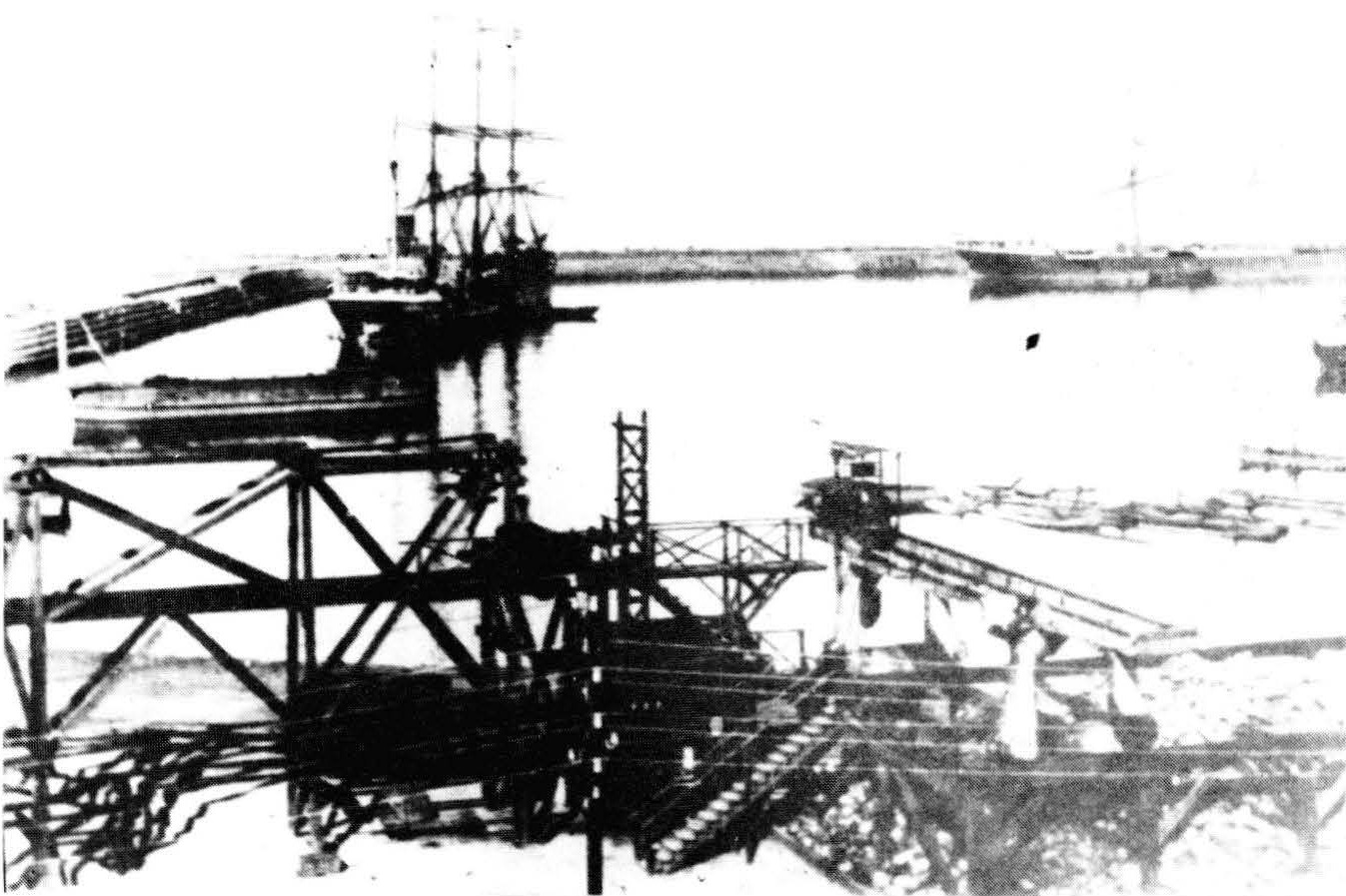
Row of ships docking.

The discovery of the copper ore in the region is historically credited to a rancher named José Rosas Villavicencio in 1868. Minor mining activities were carried out on site by Mexican and German operators until 1885. But the small scale of the operation and the desolate location made the enterprise only marginally economic.

=== Compagnie du Boleo ===
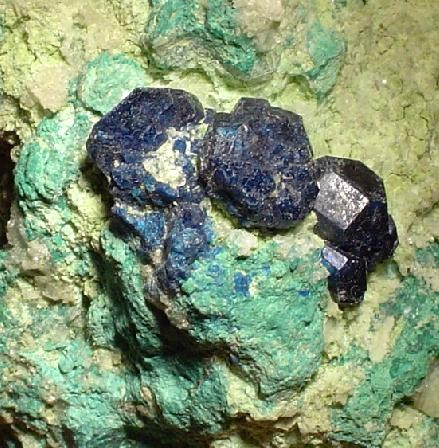
Boleite (dark blue) and atacamite (blue-green) in clay, a high-grade ore specimen from El Boleo Mine.

El Boleo was first operated, on a large commercial scale, in 1885 by the French company Compagnie du Boleo which obtained control of the property and began mining, after receiving an extensive concession and 70-year tax exemption granted by Mexican president Porfirio Diaz. Diaz apparently hoped that the mine would create a development zone in the arid and unpopulated region. 1885 is also considered the official date of the town's foundation.

The extraction of ore from the mines was labour-intensive. Chinese, Japanese, Yaqui Indians and Mestizos were brought in to work in the mine. It has been reported that many died of illness or accidents associated with the poor working conditions.

As the ore was extremely rich, (apparently a complex mixture of oxides and sulfides of up to 15% Cu) it could be fed directly to the smelter without pre-processing other than crushing. There were 7 relatively small reverberatory furnaces in the smelter and, in the 1930s, a pair of Peirce-Smith converters were added to produce blister copper (98% copper). Due to the complex metallurgy, no attempt was made to extract the cobalt, zinc, and manganese. The company created an artificial harbour from the slag of the smelter, which still endures almost unchanged to the present day.

At the end of the 19th century, El Boleo was known as the Mexican capital of copper, producing 11,000 tonnes of pure copper annually, about half of Mexico's total copper production.

In the early 20th century, the company was renowned for using technology considered to be state-of-the-art for ore processing and refining. The powerhouse, by L'usine électrique, was considered the most advanced electrical system of its time in Mexico. Not surprisingly, it worked well until the 1970s, when it was finally shut down.

The French community also established a hospital to treat the mine's workers. The Greek doctor Diamant Hadji-Mihaloglou was briefly in charge of the medical services at the hospital; he then returned to France.

The French company operated until 1954, when the tax exemption expired. The project then went bankrupt and the mine was shut down.

=== Mexican government operation ===
After 1954, the Mexican government through its Mining bureau (Namely the Comisión de Fomento Minero) reopened the works under the name of CMSRSA (Compañía Minera Santa Rosalía) to prevent the economic collapse of the town. It operated, continually at a loss, using the same (rather archaic) equipment and processes until 1984, when it definitively closed.

=== Canadian operation ===
In 1992, renewed interest by Canadian investors led to the establishment of a new mining claim. Subsequent exploration established that vast amounts of copper ore, as well as commercial quantities of cobalt, zinc, and manganese still existed on the site. Over a fifteen-year period, two test mining programs, two process pilot campaigns, and a +38,000 metre in-fill drill program were carried out, culminating in a Definitive Feasibility Study (DFS). The DFS was completed in 2007 by the current lease holder - Minera y Metallurgica del Boleo - and followed by a Technical Report update issued in March 2010. Boleo is expected to yield copper-cobalt-zinc-manganese and is fully permitted. However, the old metallurgical process used by previous operators is unfit for the recovery of these values. Small scale testing has established that a hydrometallurgical process can effectively recover all four metals, with competitive economics. The hydrometallurgical process, and the lack of fresh water at the site requires the construction of a desalination plant.

Construction at Boleo re-commenced in November 2010. Construction cost overruns reported by Baja Mining Corp. (TSX: BAJ) in 2012 threatened to halt or delay construction of the project.

=== Korean operation ===
An agreement was reached in July 2012, transferring majority ownership interest and control of the project to the Korean consortium, in return for funding the reported cost overruns. The Korean consortium led by Korea Resources Corporation (“KORES”), a state owned resources enterprise of the Republic of Korea, held a 73.8% of the ownership interest in Minera y Metallurgica del Boleo ("MMB") at the time.

Since obtaining control of MMB, CEO of KORES, Dr. Jung-Sik Koh, has reorganized its operational structure and dispatched mineral prospecting, grade control, mining, hydrometallurgy, and construction specialists to normalize operations at the project. With respect to construction of the project, a team of Korean construction monitoring team, led by KORES appointed COO at MMB, has been carrying out site construction supervision, inspection and expediting EPCM work since November 2012. Additionally, to optimize mining efficiency and secure additional tonnage at the site, MMB has been working closely on updating the geological model and mine design in cooperation with SRK and AAI.

With respect to the project financing, a portion of MMB's 2010 project financing facilities (the “2010 Project Financing”) provided by the Export‐Import Bank of the United States (“US EXIM”) to MMB was renegotiated under Korean leadership. In September 2010, US EXIM, the largest lender in the 2010 Project Financing, agreed to provide MMB with an approximately US$419 million loan facility for the construction and development of the Boleo project (the “Original US EXIM Facility”). The Original US EXIM Facility was terminated in late 2012 and KORES negotiated a new approximately US$419 million facility with US EXIM, to be used to finance further construction and development of the Boleo project.

In January 2015, production started in El Boleo, after the Canadian Baja Mining Corp fought hard to find investors to keep the project running. The industrial complex was delivered 18 months late, and the budget went off limit by $750 million. In 2017, the output of the site was much lower than predicted, which led the company to lower its future production expectations.

== Geology ==
The ore (mineralization) occurs in a strata bound form known as mantos in El Boleo Formation which is a range of clastic sedimentary rocks from siltstone to sandstones, with some claystone. They were deposited in the late Miocene in deltas and near-shore shallow marine basins. Resting unconformably above the El Boleo Formation are the Gloria, Infierno and Santa Rosalía Formations of the Pliocene and Pleistocene.

== Incidents ==
In 2014, Hurricane Odile hit the shores of Baja California Sur. The Korean manager of the El Boleo mining company, Kyong Jim Park, was killed when his vehicle was swept away by a river, and another Korean executive of the company was reported missing.
