= Sericite =

Aggregates of micas

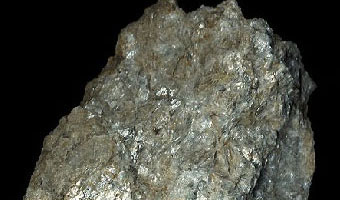
A sample of sericite

Sericite is the name given to very fine, ragged grains and aggregates of white (colourless) micas, typically made of muscovite, illite, or paragonite. Sericite is produced by the alteration of orthoclase or plagioclase feldspars in areas that have been subjected to hydrothermal alteration (also see Sericitic alteration) typically associated with copper, tin, or other hydrothermal ore deposits. Sericite also occurs as the fine mica that gives the sheen to phyllite and schistose metamorphic rocks.

The name comes from Latin sericus, meaning "silken" in reference to the location from which silk was first utilized, which in turn refers to the silky sheen of rocks with abundant sericite.

Sericite in thin section (fine, high birefringence flakes covering other larger minerals)

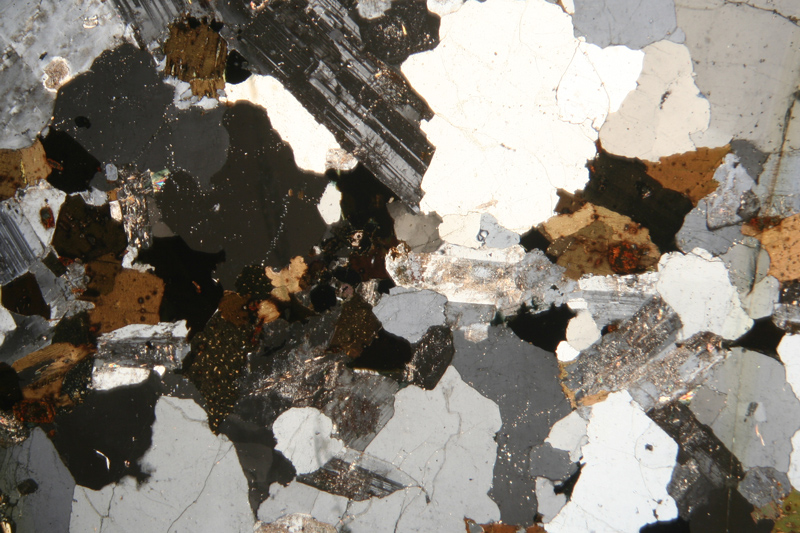
Granite in thin section under cross-polarized light in which feldspar crystals exhibit sericite alteration

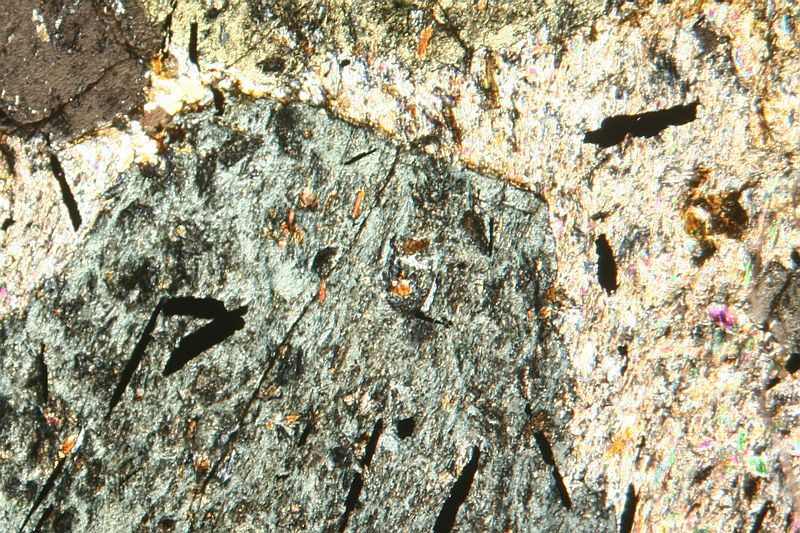
Staurolite-garnet schist in thin section under cross-polarized light with sericite
