= Sericitic alteration =

Process of mineral alteration

Sericitic alteration or sericitization is a type of hydrothermal alteration characterized by the development of fine-grained white mica assemblages collectively referred to as sericite. In the Buchans–Roberts Arm Belt of Newfoundland, these assemblages include muscovitic illite, phengite, and paragonite associated with hydrothermal alteration zones.
