= Paragonite =

Phyllosilicate mineral in the dioctahedral mica group

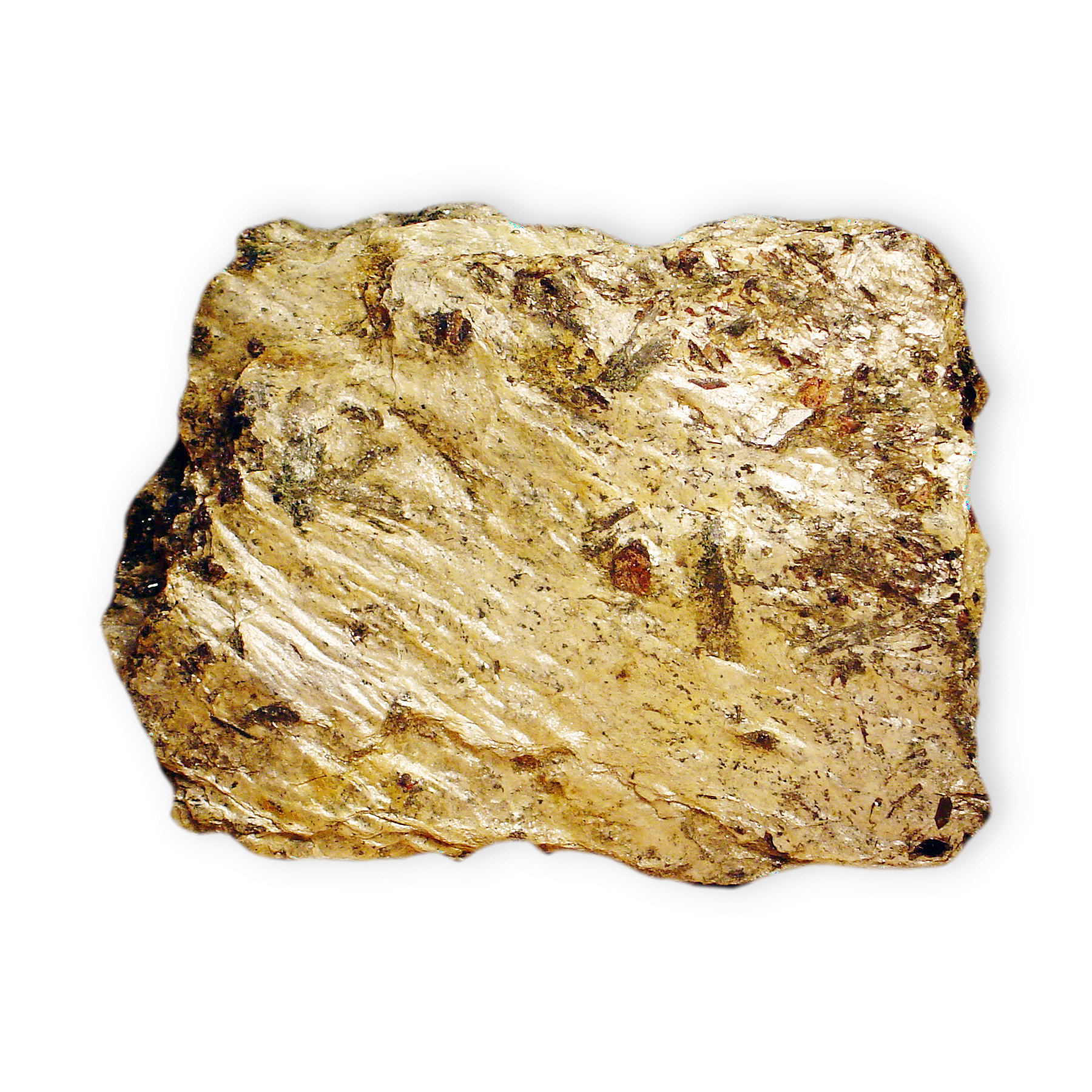
- Paragonite with garnet

General
- Category: Phyllosilicate minerals
- Group: Mica group, dioctahedral mica group
- Formula: NaAl_{2}(AlSi_{3}O_{10})(OH)_{2}
- IMA symbol: Pg
- Strunz classification: 9.EC.15
- Crystal system: Monoclinic
- Crystal class: Prismatic (2/m) (same H-M symbol)
- Space group: C2/c

Identification
- Color: Colorless, pale yellow, grayish, grayish white, greenish, light apple-green
- Crystal habit: massive, fibrous or scaly
- Twinning: common on the [310] less common on the {001}
- Cleavage: Perfect on the {001}
- Fracture: Micaeous
- Tenacity: Elastic
- Mohs scale hardness: 2.5–3
- Luster: Pearly
- Streak: White
- Diaphaneity: transparent to translucent
- Specific gravity: 2.78
- Optical properties: Biaxial (−)
- Refractive index: nα = 1.564 – 1.580 nβ = 1.594 – 1.609 nγ = 1.600 – 1.609
- Birefringence: δ = 0.036
- Dispersion: r < v strong
- Ultraviolet fluorescence: None

Paragonite is a mineral, related to muscovite. Its empirical formula is NaAl_{2}(AlSi_{3}O_{10})(OH)_{2}. A wide solvus separates muscovite from paragonite, such that there is little solid solution along the vector Na^{+}K^{+} and apparent micas of intermediate composition is most commonly a microscopic (or even sub-microscopic) intergrowth of two distinct micas, one rich in K, and the other in Na. Paragonite is a common mineral in rocks metamorphosed under blueschist facies conditions along with other sodic minerals such as albite, jadeite and glaucophane. During the transition from blueschist to greenschist facies, paragonite and glaucophane are transformed into chlorite and albite. Jadeite bearing pyroxene minerals have suggested clinozoisite and paragonite are associated and derived from lawsonite releasing quartz and water via the following reaction:

$\ce{4CaAl2Si2O8(H2O)2 + NaAlSi2O6 <=> 2Ca2Al3Si3O12(OH) + NaAl3Si3O10(OH)2 + SiO2 + 6H2O}$

It was first described in 1843 for an occurrence at Mt. Campione, Tessin, Switzerland. The name derives from the Greek, paragon, for misleading, due to its similar appearance to talc.

== See also ==
- Brammallite
