= Omphacite =

Member of the clinopyroxene group of silicate minerals

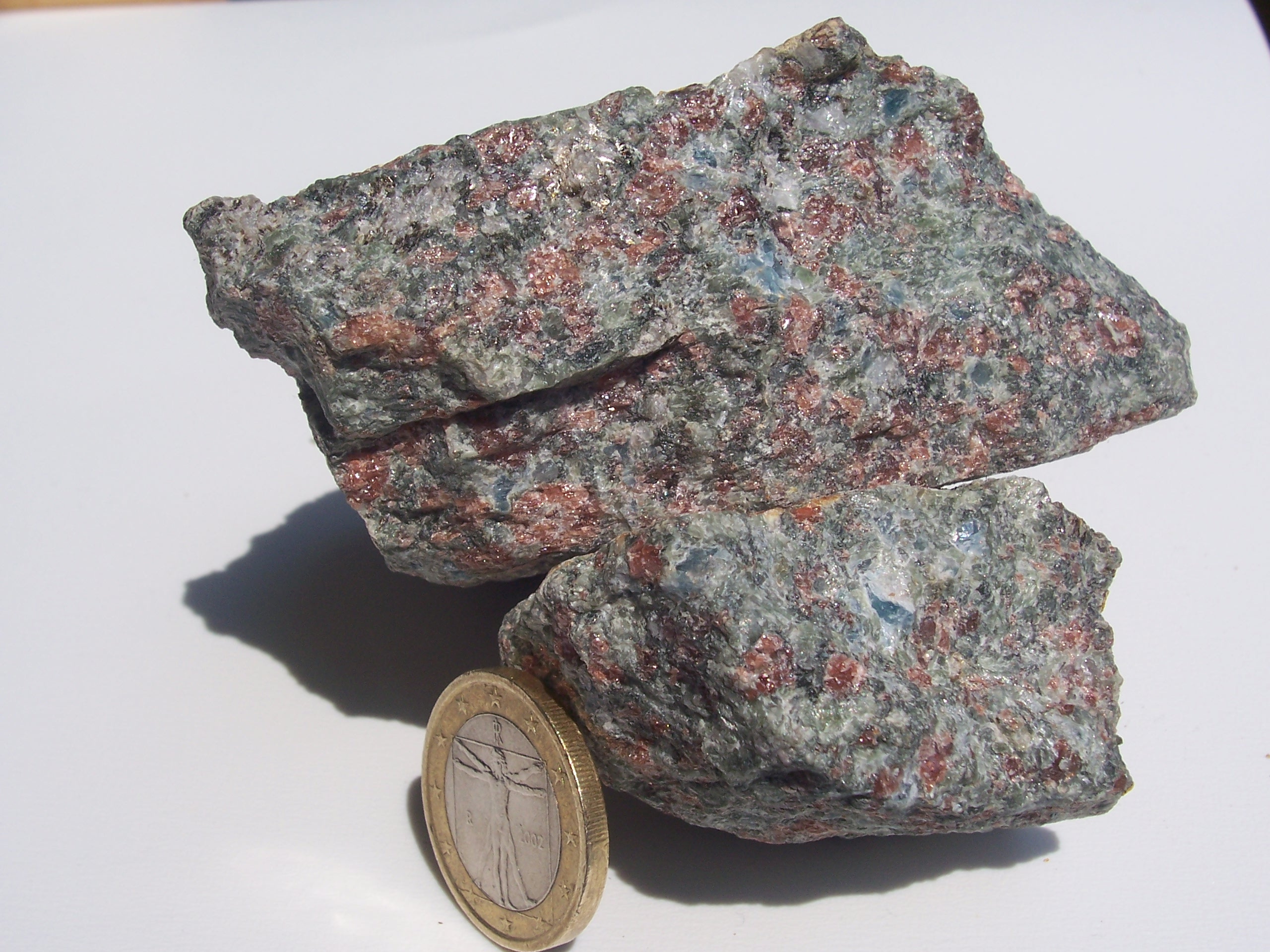
- Picture of pieces of eclogite (type of rock) from the Western Gneiss Region in Norway. The rock contains the minerals omphacite (green), pyrope-garnet (red), quartz (milky), kyanite (blue) and some phengite (golden white).

General
- Category: Pyroxene
- Formula: (Ca,Na)(Mg,Fe^{2+},Al)Si_{2}O_{6}
- IMA symbol: Omp
- Strunz classification: 9.DA.20
- Dana classification: 65.01.03b.01 (clinopyroxene)
- Crystal system: Monoclinic
- Crystal class: Prismatic (2/m) (same H-M symbol)
- Space group: P2/n or C2/c
- Unit cell: a = 9.66, b = 8.81, c = 5.22 [Å]; β = 106.56°; Z = 4

Identification
- Color: Green to dark green; colorless to pale green in thin section
- Crystal habit: Rarely in rough crystals; anhedral, granular to massive
- Twinning: Single and polysynthetic twinning common on {100}
- Cleavage: Good on {110}, {110} ^ {11̅0} ≈87°; parting on {100}
- Fracture: Uneven to conchoidal
- Tenacity: Brittle
- Mohs scale hardness: 5–6
- Luster: Vitreous to silky
- Streak: Greenish white
- Diaphaneity: Translucent
- Specific gravity: 3.16–3.43
- Optical properties: Biaxial (+)
- Refractive index: n_{α} = 1.662 – 1.701 n_{β} = 1.670 – 1.712 n_{γ} = 1.685 – 1.723
- Birefringence: δ = 0.023
- Pleochroism: Weak; X = colorless; Y = very pale green; Z = very pale green, blue-green
- 2V angle: Measured: 58° to 83°, Calculated: 74° to 88°

Omphacite is a member of the clinopyroxene group of silicate minerals with formula: (Ca, Na)(Mg, Fe^{2+}, Al)Si_{2}O_{6}. It is a variably deep to pale green or nearly colorless variety of clinopyroxene. It normally appears in eclogite, which is the high-pressure metamorphic rock of basalt. Omphacite is the solid solution of Fe-bearing diopside and jadeite. It crystallizes in the monoclinic system with prismatic, typically twinned forms, though usually anhedral. Its space group can be P2/n or C2/c depending on the thermal history. It exhibits the typical near 90° pyroxene cleavage. It is brittle with specific gravity of 3.29 to 3.39 and a Mohs hardness of 5 to 6.

== Formation and occurrence ==
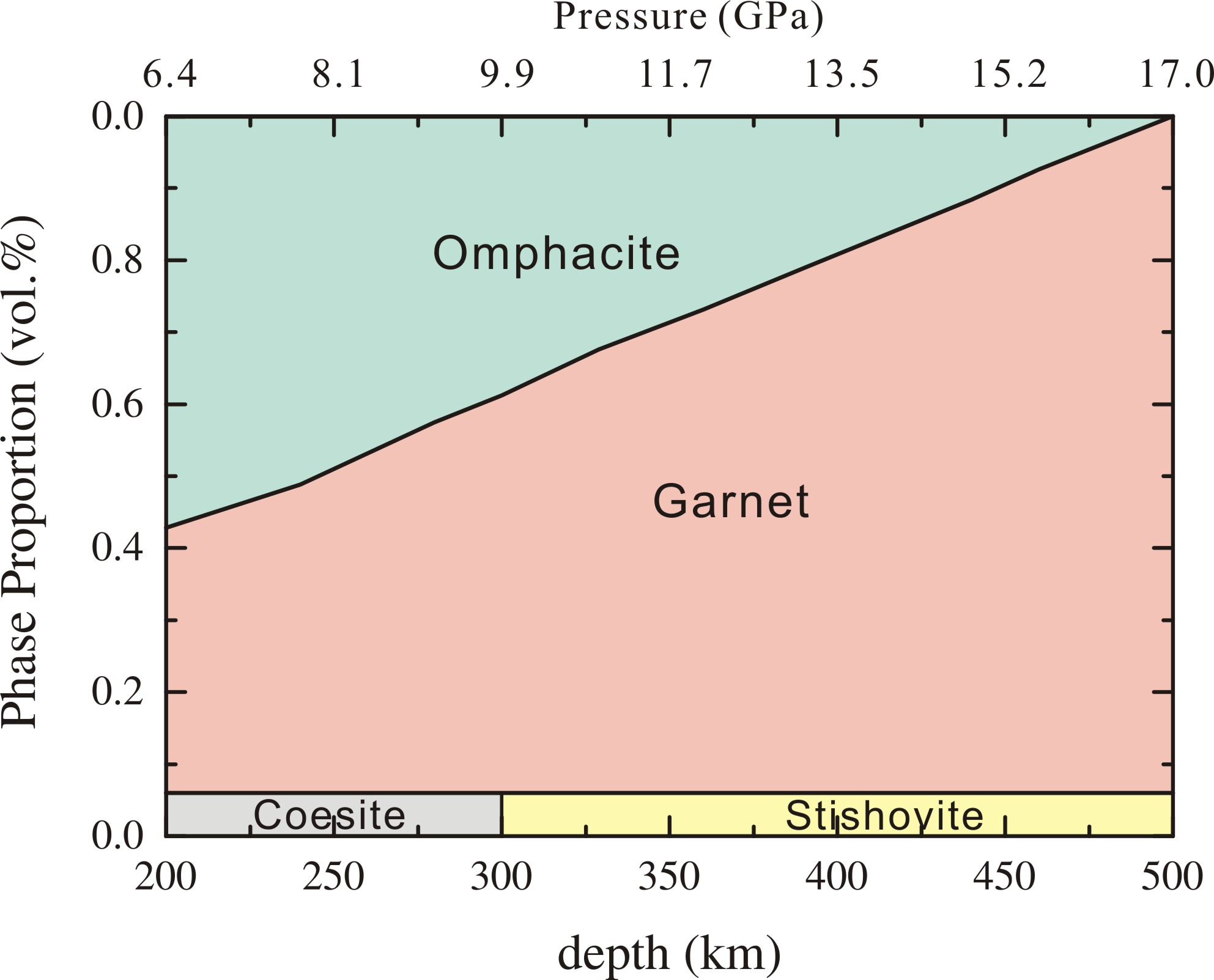
Phase diagram of slab crust in the Earth's upper mantle from 200 to 500 km depth. Omphacite general dissolves into garnet as depth increases. Omphacite can stable up to ~500 km depth.

Omphacite is the dominant phase in the subducted oceanic crust in the Earth's upper mantle. The Mid-Ocean Ridge Basalt, which makes up oceanic crust, goes through ultrahigh-pressure metamorphic process and transforms to eclogite at depth ~60 km in the subduction zones. The major mineral components of eclogite include omphacite, garnet and high-pressure silica phases (coesite and stishovite). As depth increases, the omphacite in eclogite gradually transforms to majoritic garnet. Omphacite is stable up to 500 km depth in the Earth's interior. Considering the cold geotherm of subducted slabs, omphacite can be stable even in deeper mantle.

It also occurs in blueschist facies and ultrahigh-pressure metamorphic rocks. It is also found in eclogite xenoliths from kimberlite as well as in crustal rocks metamorphosed at high pressures. Associated minerals in eclogites except the major minerals include rutile, kyanite, phengite, and lawsonite. Minerals such as glaucophane, lawsonite, titanite, and epidote occur with omphacite in blueschist facies metamorphic rocks. The name "jade", usually referring to rocks made of jadeite, is sometimes also applied to rocks consisting entirely of omphacite.

== Chemical composition ==
Omphacite is the solid solution of Fe-bearing diopside (CaMgSi_{2}O_{6}) and jadeite (NaAlSi_{2}O_{6}). Depending on how much the coupled substitution of (Na, Al)-(Mg-Fe, Ca) happens, the chemical composition of omphacite varies continuously from pure diopside to pure jadeite. Due to the relatively small radius of (Na, Al) atoms, the unit cell volume linearly decreases as jadeite component increases. In addition, the coupled substitution also stiffens the crystals. The bulk and shear modulus linearly increases as jadeite component increases.

A typical omphacite from eclogite has the following major elemental proportions expressed as percentages of oxides:

SiO_{2}	56.02% (silica)
Al_{2}O_{3}	12.74% (alumina)
CaO	12.45%
MgO	8.01%
Na_{2}O	7.05%
FeO	1.64%
Fe_{2}O_{3}	0.88%
K_{2}O	0.40%
TiO_{2}	0.38%
MnO	0.00%

== Space group ==
Although omphacite is the solid solution of diopside and jadeite, its space group may be different with them. The space group of diopside and jadeite is C2/c. However, omphacite can show both P2/n and C2/c space group. At low temperature, the partial coupled substitution of (Na, Al)-(Mg-Fe, Ca) in omphacite orders the atoms in the unit cell and makes omphacite shows a relatively low symmetry space group P2/n. As temperature increases, the movements of the atoms increase and finally the coupled substitution will not influence the order of the structure. When temperature reaches ~700–750 °C, the structure of omphacite becomes totally disordered and the space group will transform to C2/c. Natural omphacite may show C2/c structure even at room temperature if the omphacite crystal went through fast temperature decreasing.

Although the atomic positions in the two space groups have a subtle difference, it does not clearly change the physical properties of omphacite. The absolute unit cell volumes are a little different for the two different space group, the compressibility and thermal expansion does not show obviously different within experimental uncertainties.

== Etymology and history ==
It was first described in 1815 in the Münchberg Metamorphic complex, Franconia, Bavaria, Germany. The name omphacite derives from the Greek omphax or unripe grape for the typical green color.
