= Talc =

Phyllosilicate mineral in the pyrophyllite-talc group

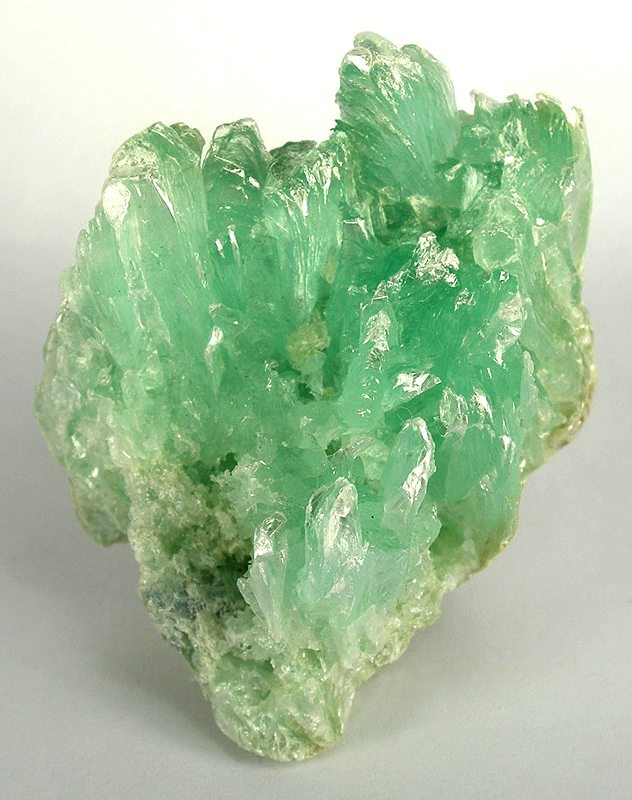

General
- Category: Phyllosilicate minerals
- Group: Pyrophyllite-Talc group
- Formula: Mg_{3}Si_{4}O_{10}(OH)_{2}
- IMA symbol: Tlc
- Strunz classification: 9.EC.05
- Crystal system: Monoclinic or triclinic
- Crystal class: Either prismatic (2m) or pinacoidal (1̅)
- Space group: C2/c or C1̅
- Unit cell: a = 5.291 Å, b = 9.173 Å c = 5.290 Å; α = 98.68° β = 119.90°, γ = 90.09°; Z = 2 or a = 5.287 Å, b = 9.158 Å c = 18.95 [Å], β = 99.3°; Z = 4

Identification
- Color: Light to dark green, brown, white, grey, colorless
- Crystal habit: Foliated to fibrous masses, rare as platey to pyramidal crystals
- Cleavage: Perfect on {001} basal cleavage
- Fracture: Flat surfaces (not cleavage), fracture in an uneven pattern
- Tenacity: Sectile
- Mohs scale hardness: 1 (defining mineral)
- Luster: Waxy or pearly
- Streak: White jot to pearl black
- Diaphaneity: Translucent
- Specific gravity: 2.58–2.83
- Optical properties: Biaxial (−)
- Refractive index: n_{α} = 1.538 – 1.550 n_{β} = 1.589 – 1.594 n_{γ} = 1.589 – 1.600
- Birefringence: δ = 0.051
- Pleochroism: Weak in dark varieties
- Ultraviolet fluorescence: Short UV: orange yellow; long UV: yellow

Talc, or talcum, is a clay mineral composed of hydrated magnesium silicate, with the chemical formula Mg_{3}Si_{4}O_{10}(OH)_{2}. Talc in powdered form, often combined with corn starch, is used as baby powder. This mineral is used as a thickening agent and lubricant. It is an ingredient in ceramics, paints, and roofing material. It is a main ingredient in many cosmetics. It occurs as foliated to fibrous masses, and in an exceptionally rare crystal form. It has a perfect basal cleavage and an uneven flat fracture, and it is foliated with a two-dimensional platy form.

The Mohs scale of mineral hardness, based on scratch hardness comparison, defines value 1 as the hardness of talc, the softest mineral. When scraped on a streak plate, talc produces a white streak, though this indicator is of little importance, because most silicate minerals produce a white streak. Talc is translucent to opaque, with colors ranging from whitish grey to green with a vitreous and pearly luster. Talc is not soluble in water, and is slightly soluble in dilute mineral acids.

Soapstone is a metamorphic rock composed predominantly of talc.

== Etymology ==
The word talc derives from Persian: تالک tālk. In ancient times, the word was used for various related minerals, including talc, mica, and selenite.

== Formation ==
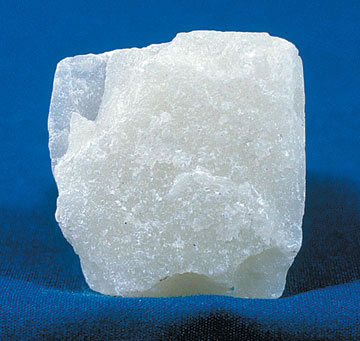
A block of talc

Talc dominantly forms from the metamorphism of magnesian minerals such as serpentine, pyroxene, amphibole, and olivine, in the presence of carbon dioxide and water. This is known as "talc carbonation" or "steatization" and produces a suite of rocks known as talc carbonates.

Talc is primarily formed by hydration and carbonation by this reaction:

+ → + +

Talc can also be formed via a reaction between dolomite and silica, which is typical of skarnification of dolomites by silica-flooding in contact metamorphic aureoles:

+ + → + +

Talc can also be formed from magnesium chlorite and quartz in blueschist and eclogite metamorphism by the following metamorphic reaction:

chlorite + quartz → kyanite + talc + water

Talc is also found as a diagenetic mineral in sedimentary rocks where it can form from the transformation of metastable hydrated magnesium-clay precursors such as kerolite, sepiolite, or stevensite that can precipitate from marine and lake water in certain conditions.

In this reaction, the ratio of talc and kyanite depends on aluminium content, with more aluminous rocks favoring production of kyanite. This is typically associated with high-pressure, low-temperature minerals such as phengite, garnet, and glaucophane within the lower blueschist facies. Such rocks are typically white, friable, and fibrous, and are known as whiteschist.

Talc is a trioctahedral layered mineral; its structure is similar to pyrophyllite, but with magnesium in the octahedral sites of the composite layers. The crystal structure of talc is described as TOT, meaning that it is composed of parallel TOT layers weakly bonded to each other by weak van der Waals forces. The TOT layers in turn consist of two tetrahedral sheets (T) strongly bonded to the two faces of a single trioctahedral sheet (O). It is the weak bonding between TOT layers that gives talc its perfect basal cleavage and softness.

The tetrahedral sheets consist of silica tetrahedra, which are silicon ions surrounded by four oxygen ions. The tetrahedra each share three of their four oxygen ions with neighboring tetrahedra to produce a hexagonal sheet. The remaining oxygen ion (the apical oxygen ion) is available to bond with the trioctahedral sheet.

The trioctahedral sheet has the structure of a sheet of the mineral brucite. Apical oxygens take the place of some of the hydroxyl ions that would be present in a brucite sheet, bonding the tetrahedral sheets tightly to the trioctahedral sheet.

Tetrahedral sheets have a negative charge, since their bulk composition is Si_{4}O^{4−}_{10}. The trioctahedral sheet has an equal positive charge, since its bulk composition is Mg_{3}(OH)^{4+}_{2} The combined TOT layer thus is electrically neutral.

Because the hexagons in the T and O sheets are slightly different in size, the sheets are slightly distorted when they bond into a TOT layer. This breaks the hexagonal symmetry and reduces it to monoclinic or triclinic symmetry. However, the original hexahedral symmetry is discernible in the pseudotrigonal character of talc crystals.

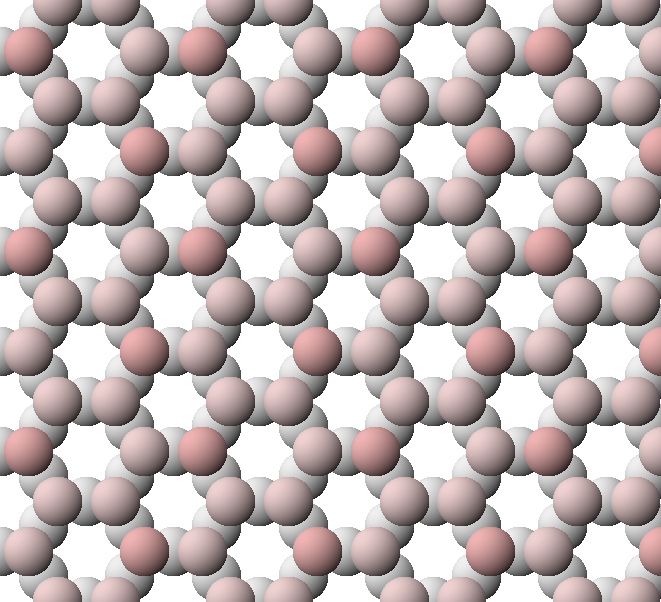
View of tetrahedral sheet structure of talc. The apical oxygen ions are tinted pink.

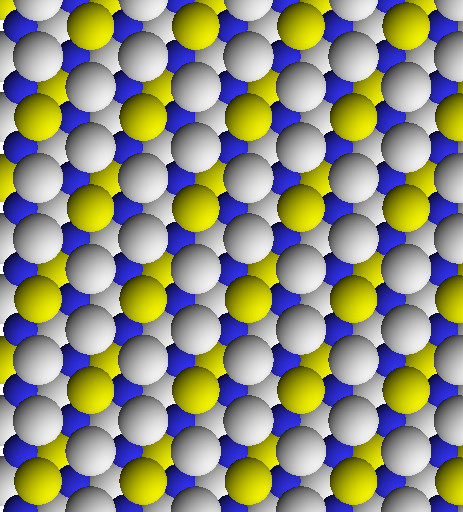
View of trioctahedral sheet of talc. Yellow spheres are hydroxyl; blue are magnesium. Apical oxygen binding sites are white.

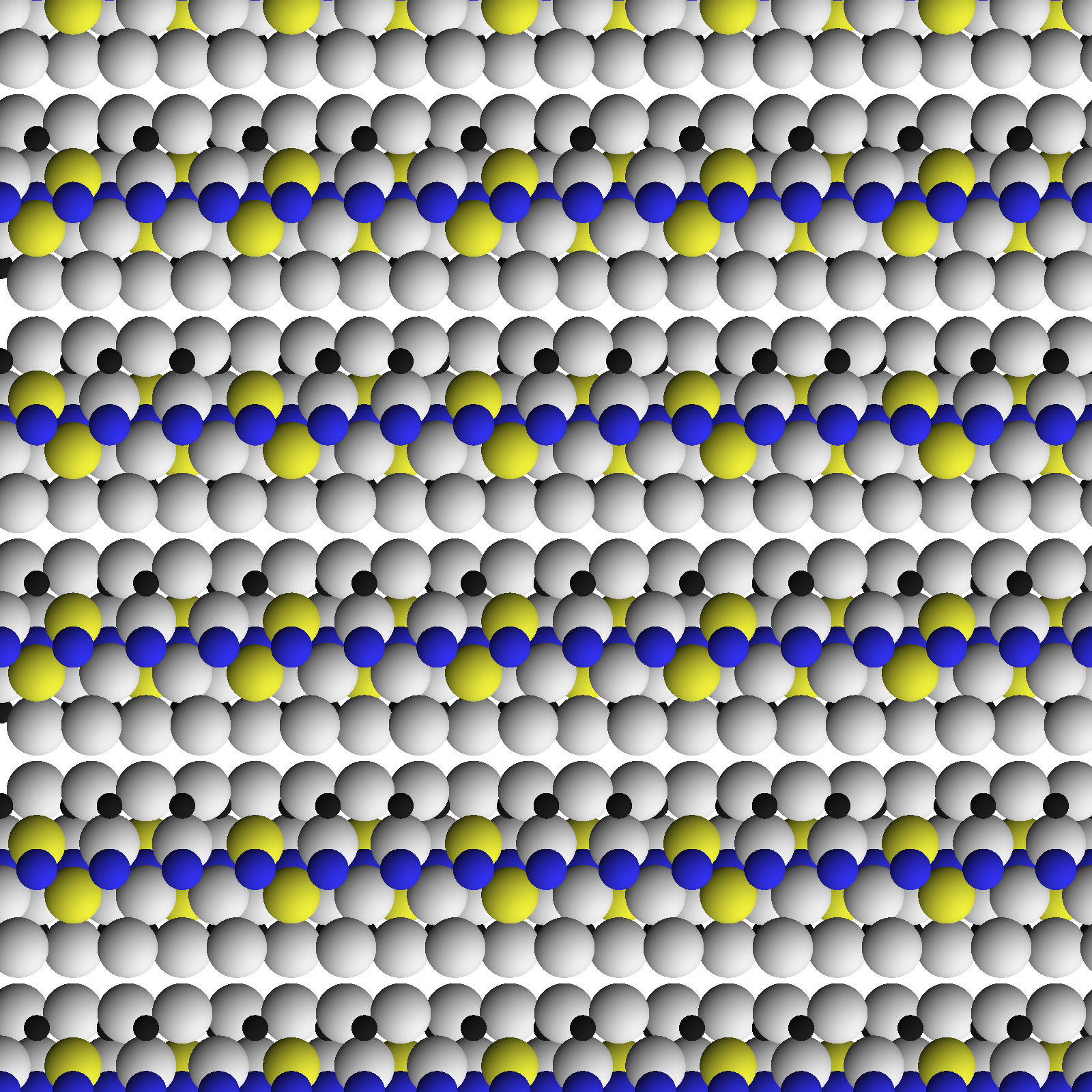
Talc crystal viewed along the [100] axis, looking along the layers of the crystal

== Occurrence ==
Talc and pyrophyllite production

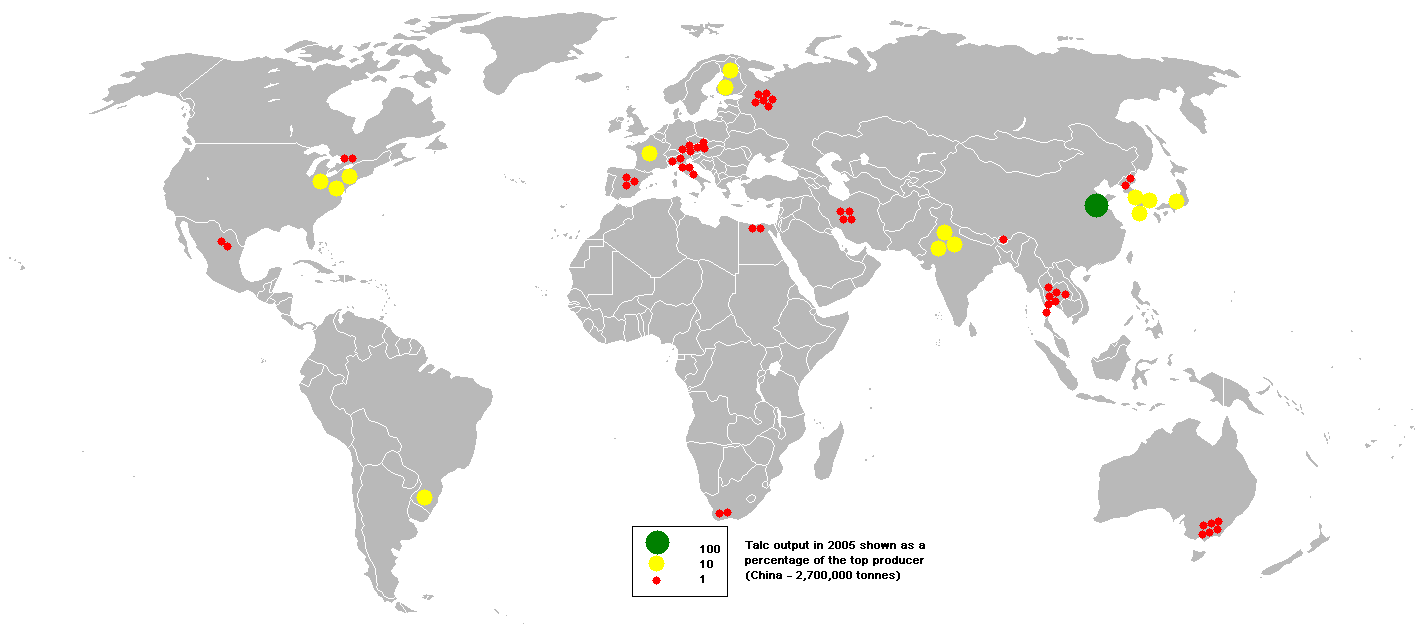
Talc output in 2005

Miners working a Talc mine (Tumby Bay?), Australia, c. 1950

Talc is a common metamorphic mineral in metamorphic belts that contain ultramafic rocks, such as soapstone (a high-talc rock), and within whiteschist and blueschist metamorphic terranes. Prime examples of whiteschists include the Franciscan Metamorphic Belt of the western United States, the western European Alps especially in Italy, certain areas of the Musgrave Block, and some collisional orogens such as the Himalayas, which stretch along Pakistan, India, Nepal, and Bhutan.

Talc carbonate ultramafics are typical of many areas of the Archaean cratons, notably the komatiite belts of the Yilgarn craton in Western Australia. Talc-carbonate ultramafics are also known from the Lachlan Fold Belt, eastern Australia, from Brazil, the Guiana Shield, and from the ophiolite belts of Turkey, Oman, and the Middle East.

China is the key world talc and steatite-producing country with an output of about 2.2 million tonnes (2016), which accounts for 30% of total global output. The other major producers are Brazil (12%), India (11%), the U.S. (9%), France (6%), Finland (4%), Italy, Russia, Canada, and Austria (2%, each).

Notable economic talc occurrences include the Mount Seabrook talc mine, Western Australia, formed upon a polydeformed, layered ultramafic intrusion. The France-based Luzenac Group is the world's largest supplier of mined talc. Its largest talc mine at Trimouns near Luzenac in southern France produces 400,000 tonnes of talc per year.

== Conflict mineral ==
Extraction in disputed areas of Nangarhar province, Afghanistan, has led the international monitoring group Global Witness to declare talc a conflict resource, as the profits are used to fund armed confrontation between the Taliban and Islamic State.

== Uses ==
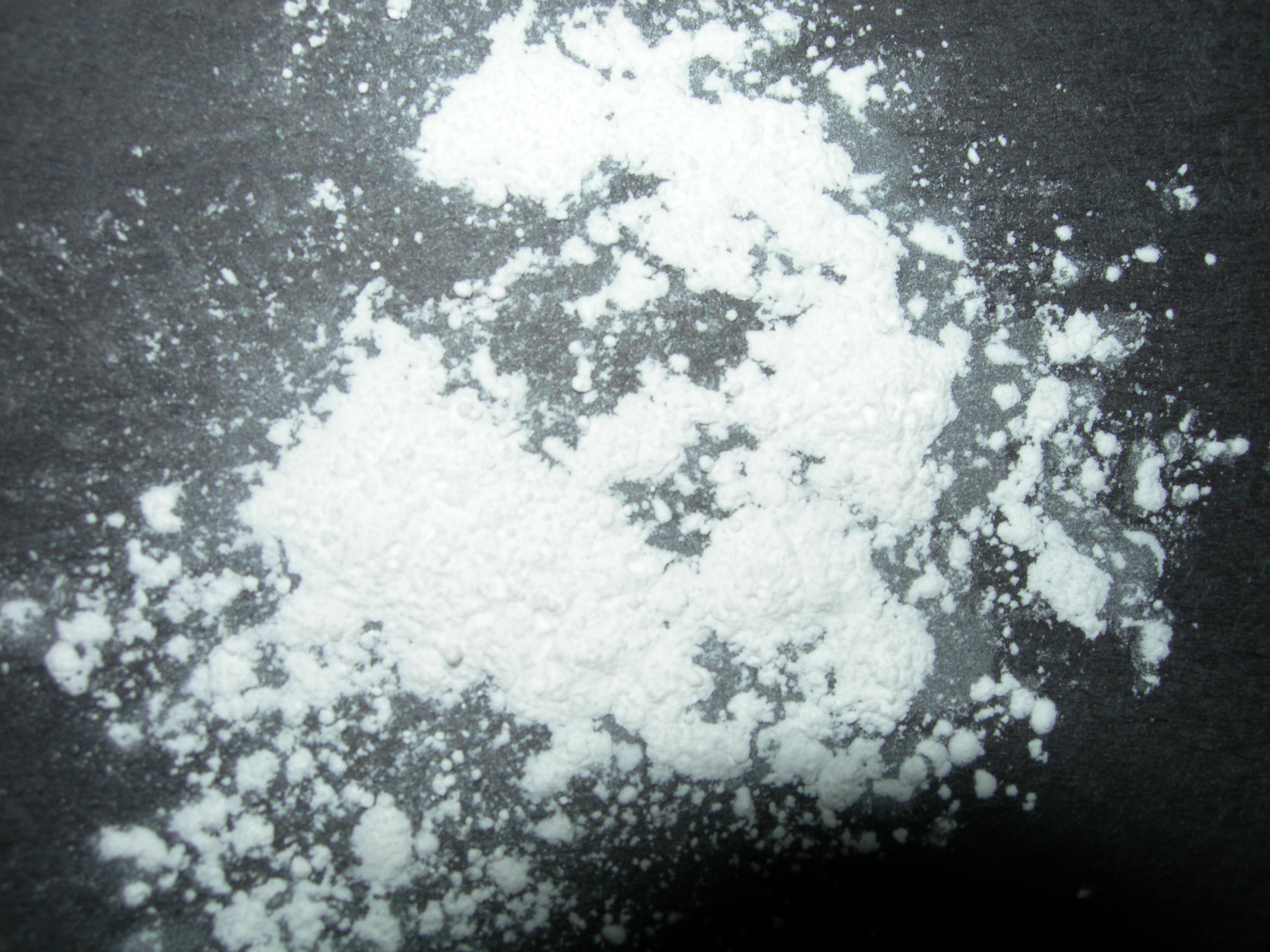
Talcum powder

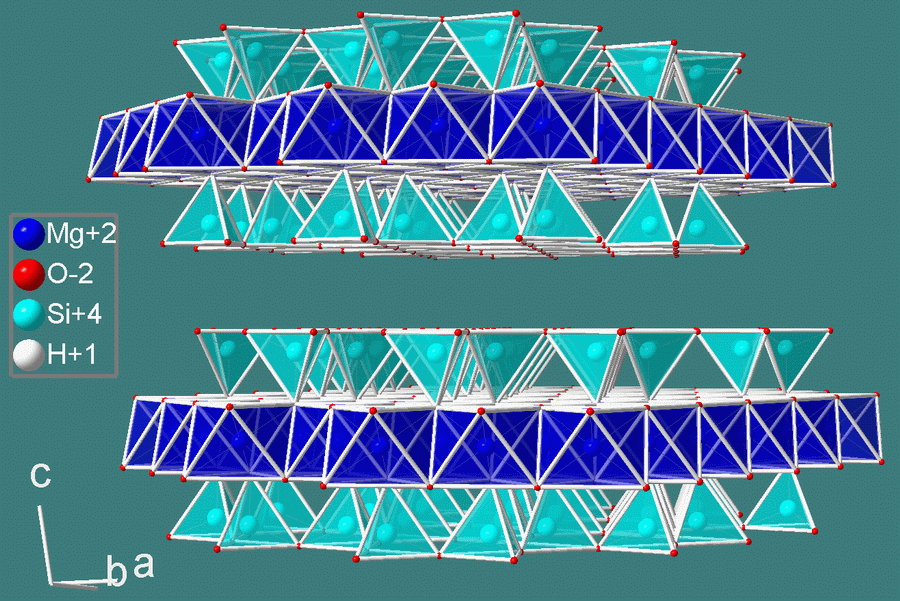
The structure of talc is composed of Si_{2}O_{5} sheets with magnesium sandwiched between sheets in octahedral sites.

Talc is used in many industries, including paper making, plastic, paint and coatings (e.g. for metal casting molds), rubber, food, electric cable, pharmaceuticals, cosmetics, and ceramics. Plastics were the largest end use of talc produced and sold in the United States in 2024, at 32%; in plastics, talc is compounded at about 0.5 to 40 wt% to raise stiffness and heat resistance, control shrinkage and nucleate polypropylene. A coarse grayish-green high-talc rock is soapstone or steatite, used for stoves, sinks, electrical switchboards, etc. It is often used for surfaces of laboratory table tops and electrical switchboards because of its resistance to heat, electricity, and acids.

In finely ground form, talc finds use as a cosmetic (talcum powder), as a lubricant, and as a filler in paper manufacture. It is used to coat the insides of inner tubes and rubber gloves during manufacture to keep the surfaces from sticking. Talcum powder, with heavy refinement, has been used in baby powder, an astringent powder used to prevent diaper rash (nappy rash). The American Academy of Pediatrics recommends that parents avoid using baby powder because it poses a risk of respiratory problems, including breathing trouble and serious lung damage if inhaled. The small size of the particles makes it difficult to keep them out of the air while applying the powder. Zinc oxide-based ointments may offer a safer alternative for the prevention of diaper rash.

Soapstone (massive talc) is often used as a marker for welding or metalworking.

Talc is also used as food additive or in pharmaceutical products as a glidant. In medicine, talc is used as a pleurodesis agent to prevent recurrent pleural effusion or pneumothorax. In the European Union, the additive number is E553b. Talc may be used in the processing of white rice as a buffing agent in the polishing stage.

Because of its low shear strength, talc is one of the oldest known solid lubricants. It also has some limited use as a friction-reducing additive in lubricating oils.

Talc is widely used in the ceramics industry in both bodies and glazes. In low-fire art-ware bodies, it imparts whiteness and increases thermal expansion to resist crazing. In stonewares, small percentages of talc are used to flux the body and therefore improve strength and vitrification. It is a source of MgO flux in high-temperature glazes (to control melting temperature). It is also employed as a matting agent in earthenware glazes and can be used to produce magnesia mattes at high temperatures.

ISO standard for quality (ISO 3262)

| Type | Talc content min. wt% | Loss on ignition at 1000 °C, wt % | Solubility in HCl, max. wt % |
|---|---|---|---|
| A | 95 | 4–6.5 | 5 |
| B | 90 | 4–9 | 10 |
| C | 70 | 4–18 | 30 |
| D | 50 | 4–27 | 30 |

Patents are pending on the use of magnesium silicate as a cement substitute. Its production requirements are less energy-intensive than ordinary Portland cement (at a heating requirement of around 650 °C for talc compared to 1,500 °C for limestone to produce Portland cement), while it absorbs far more carbon dioxide as it hardens. This results in a negative carbon footprint overall, as the cement substitute removes 0.6 tonnes of CO_{2} per tonne used. This contrasts with a positive carbon footprint of 0.4 tonnes per tonne of conventional cement.

Talc is sometimes used as an adulterant to illegal heroin, to expand volume and weight and thereby increase its street value. With intravenous use, it may lead to pulmonary talcosis, a granulomatous inflammation in the lungs.

=== Sterile talc powder ===
Sterile talc powder (NDC 63256-200-05) is a sclerosing agent used in the procedure of pleurodesis. This can be helpful as a cancer treatment to prevent pleural effusions (an abnormal collection of fluid in the space between the lungs and the thoracic wall). It is inserted into the space via a chest tube, causing it to close up, so fluid cannot collect there. The product can be sterilized by dry heat, ethylene oxide, or gamma irradiation.

== Safety ==
Suspicions have been raised that talc use contributes to certain types of disease, mainly cancers of the ovaries and lungs. According to the IARC, talc containing asbestos is classified as a group 1 agent (carcinogenic to humans), talc use in the perineum is classified as group 2B (possibly carcinogenic to humans), and talc not containing asbestos is classified as group 2A (probably carcinogenic to humans). Reviews by Cancer Research UK and the American Cancer Society conclude that some studies have found a link, but other studies have not.

The studies discuss pulmonary issues, lung cancer, and ovarian cancer. One of these, published in 1993, was a US National Toxicology Program report, which found that cosmetic grade talc containing no asbestos-like fibres was correlated with tumor formation in rats forced to inhale talc for 6 hours a day, five days a week over at least 113 weeks. A 1971 paper found particles of talc embedded in 75% of the ovarian tumors studied. In 2018, Health Canada issued a warning against inhaling talcum powder or women's using it perineally.

In contrast, however, research published in 1995 and 2000 concluded that, although it was plausible that talc could cause ovarian cancer, no conclusive evidence had been shown. Further, a 2008 European Journal of Cancer Prevention review of ovarian cancer and talc use studies pointed out that, although many of them examined the duration, frequency, and accumulation of hygienic talc use, few found a positive association among these factors and some found a negative one: "It may be argued that the overall null findings associated with talc-dusted diaphragms and condom use is more convincing evidence for a lack of a carcinogenic effect, especially given the lack of an established correlation between perineal dusting frequency and ovarian tissue talc concentrations and the lack of a consistent dose-response relationship with ovarian cancer risk." Instead, the authors credited powdered talc with "a high degree of safety."

Similarly, in a 2014 article published in a leading cancer journal, the Journal of the National Cancer Institute, researchers reported the results of a survey of 61,576 postmenopausal women, more than half of whom had used talc powder perineally. The researchers compared the subjects' reports of their own talc use with their reports of having had ovarian cancer diagnosed by their doctors, and found, regardless of subjects' age and tubal ligation status, "Ever use of perineal powder ... was not associated with risk of ovarian cancer compared with never use," nor was any greater individual cancer risk associated with longer use of talc powder. On this basis, the article concluded, "perineal powder use does not appear to influence ovarian cancer risk." The Cosmetic Ingredient Review Expert Panel concluded in 2015 that talc, in the concentrations currently used in cosmetics, is safe.

In July 2024, the International Agency for Research on Cancer listed talc as "probably" carcinogenic for humans. The study is based on limited evidence it could cause ovarian cancer in humans.

=== Industrial grade ===
In the United States, the Occupational Safety and Health Administration and National Institute for Occupational Safety and Health have set occupational exposure limits to respirable talc dusts at 2 mg/m^{3} over an eight-hour workday. At levels of 1000 mg/m^{3}, inhalation of talc is considered immediately dangerous to life and health.

=== Food grade ===
The United States Food and Drug Administration considers talc (magnesium silicate) generally recognized as safe (GRAS) to use as an anticaking agent in table salt in concentrations smaller than 2%.

=== Association with asbestos ===
One particular issue with commercial use of talc is its frequent co-location in underground deposits with asbestos ore. Asbestos is a general term for different types of fibrous silicate minerals, desirable in construction for their heat resistant properties. There are six varieties of asbestos; the most common variety in manufacturing, white asbestos, is in the serpentine family. Serpentine minerals are sheet silicates; although not in the serpentine family, talc is also a sheet silicate, with two sheets connected by magnesium cations. The frequent co-location of talc deposits with asbestos may result in contamination of mined talc with white asbestos, which poses serious health risks when dispersed into the air and inhaled. Stringent quality control since 1976, including separating cosmetic- and food-grade talc from that destined for industrial use, has largely eliminated this issue, but it remains a potential hazard requiring mitigation in the mining and processing of talc. A 2010 US FDA survey failed to find asbestos in a variety of talc-containing products. A 2018 Reuters investigation asserted that pharmaceuticals company Johnson & Johnson knew for decades that there was asbestos in its baby powder, and in 2020 the company stopped selling its baby powder in the US and Canada. There were calls for Johnson & Johnson's largest shareholders to force the company to end global sales of baby powder, and hire an independent firm to conduct a racial justice audit as it had been marketed to African American and overweight women. On August 11, 2022, the company announced it would stop making talc-based powder by 2023 and replace it with cornstarch-based powders. The company said the talc-based powder is safe to use and does not contain asbestos.

== Litigation ==
In 2006 the International Agency for Research on Cancer classified talcum powder as a possible human carcinogen if used in the female genital area. Despite this, no federal agency in the US acted to remove talcum powder from the market or add warnings.

In February 2016, as the result of a lawsuit against Johnson & Johnson (J&J), a St. Louis jury awarded $72 million to the family of an Alabama woman who died from ovarian cancer. The family claimed that the use of talcum powder was responsible for her cancer.

In May 2016, a South Dakota woman was awarded $55 million as the result of another lawsuit against J&J. The woman had used Johnson & Johnson's Baby Powder for more than 35 years before being diagnosed with ovarian cancer in 2011.

In October 2016, a St. Louis jury awarded $70.1 million to a Californian woman with ovarian cancer who had used Johnson's Baby Powder for 45 years.

In August 2017, a Los Angeles jury awarded $417 million to a Californian woman, Eva Echeverria, who developed ovarian cancer as a "proximate result of the unreasonably dangerous and defective nature of talcum powder", her lawsuit against Johnson & Johnson stated. On 20 October 2017, Los Angeles Superior Court judge Maren Nelson dismissed the verdict. The judge stated that Echeverria proved there is "an ongoing debate in the scientific and medical community about whether talc more probably than not causes ovarian cancer and thus (gives) rise to a duty to warn", but not enough to sustain the jury's imposition of liability against Johnson & Johnson stated, and concluded that Echeverria did not adequately establish that talc causes ovarian cancer.

In July 2018, a court in St. Louis awarded a $4.7bn claim ($4.14bn in punitive damages and $550m in compensatory damages) against J&J to 22 claimant women, concluding that the company had suppressed evidence of asbestos in its products for more than four decades.

At least 38,000 other talcum powder-related lawsuits were pending as of 2023.

In 2020 J&J stopped sales of its talcum-based baby powder, which it had been selling for 130 years. J&J created a subsidiary responsible for the claims in an effort to resolve the lawsuits in bankruptcy court. In 2023 J&J proposed a nearly $9bn settlement with 50,000 claimants saying the claims were "specious" but it wanted to move on from the issue, but judges blocked the plans, ruling that the subsidiary was not in financial distress and could not use the bankruptcy system to resolve the lawsuits.

In July 2023 J&J sued researchers who linked talc to mesothelioma, a rare form of lung cancer, alleging that the researchers had used junk science to disparage the company's products. The defendants asserted the lawsuits are meant to silence scientists. In August 2026, a U.S. judge in Virginia ruled that the researchers did not defame the company in presenting their findings: there were "mistakes" in their published research but nothing that was obvious or ignored that would imply "malice" in their article. J&J aids they would appeal.

== See also ==
- Pyrophyllite – Phyllosilicate mineral in the pyrophyllite-talc group
- Serpentinite – Rock formed by transformation of olivine
- Sillimanite – Nesosilicate mineral
