= Ultra-high-pressure metamorphism =

Ultra-high-pressure metamorphism refers to metamorphic processes at pressures high enough to stabilize coesite, the high-pressure polymorph of SiO_{2}. It is important because the processes that form and exhume ultra-high-pressure (UHP) metamorphic rocks may strongly affect plate tectonics, the composition and evolution of Earth's crust. The discovery of UHP metamorphic rocks in 1984 revolutionized our understanding of plate tectonics. Prior to 1984 there was little suspicion that continental rocks could reach such high pressures.

The formation of many UHP terrains has been attributed to the subduction of microcontinents or continental margins and the exhumation of all UHP terrains has been ascribed principally to buoyancy caused by the low density of continental crust—even at UHP—relative to Earth's mantle. While the subduction proceeds at low thermal gradients of less than 10°C/km, the exhumation proceeds at elevated thermal gradients of 10-30°C/km.

== Definition ==
Metamorphism of rocks at pressures ≥27kbar (2.7GPa) to stabilize coesite, the high-pressure polymorph of SiO_{2}, recognized by either the presence of a diagnostic mineral (e.g., coesite or diamond), mineral assemblage (e.g., magnesite + aragonite), or mineral compositions.

== Identification ==
Petrological indicators of UHP metamorphism are usually preserved in eclogite. The presence of metamorphic coesite, diamond, or majoritic garnet are diagnostic; other potential mineralogical indicators of UHP metamorphism, such as alpha-PbO_{2} structured TiO_{2}, are not widely accepted. Mineral assemblages, rather than single minerals, can also be used to identify UHP rocks; these assemblages include magnesite + aragonite. Because minerals change composition in response to changes in pressure and temperature, mineral compositions can be used to calculate pressure and temperature; for UHP eclogite the best geobarometers involve garnet + clinopyroxene + K-white mica and garnet + clinopyroxene + kyanite + coesite/quartz. Most UHP rocks were metamorphosed at peak conditions of 800 °C and 3 GPa. At least two UHP localities record higher temperatures: the Bohemian and Kokchetav Massifs reached 1000–1200 °C at pressures of at least 4 GPa.

Most felsic UHP rocks have undergone extensive retrograde metamorphism and preserve little or no UHP record. Commonly, only a few eclogite enclaves or UHP minerals reveal that the entire terrain was subducted to mantle depths. Many granulite terrains and even batholithic rocks may have undergone UHP metamorphism that was subsequently obliterated

== Global distribution ==
Geologists have identified UHP terrains at more than twenty localities around the globe in most well-studied Phanerozoic continental orogenic belts; most occur in Eurasia. Coesite is relatively widespread, diamond less so, and majoritic garnet is known from only rare localities. The oldest UHP terrain is 620 Ma and is exposed in Mali; the youngest is 8 Ma and exposed in the D'Entrecasteaux Islands of Papua New Guinea. A modest number of continental orogens have undergone multiple UHP episodes.

UHP terrains vary greatly in size, from the >30,000 km2 giant UHP terrains in Norway and China, to small kilometer-scale bodies. The giant UHP terrains have a metamorphic history spanning tens of millions of years, whereas the small UHP terrains have a metamorphic history spanning millions of years. All are dominated by quartzofeldspathic gneiss with a few percent mafic rock (eclogite) or ultramafic rock (garnet-bearing peridotite). Some include sedimentary or rift-volcanic sequences that have been interpreted as passive margins prior to metamorphism.

== Implications and importance ==
UHP rocks record pressures greater than those that prevail within Earth's crust. Earth's crust is a maximum of 70–80 km thickness, and pressures at the base are <2.7 GPa for typical crustal densities. UHP rocks therefore come from depths within Earth's mantle. UHP rocks of a wide variety of compositions have been identified as both regional metamorphic terrains and xenoliths.

UHP ultramafic xenoliths of mantle affinity provide information (e.g., mineralogy or deformation mechanisms) about processes active deep in Earth. UHP xenoliths of crustal affinity provide information about processes active deep in Earth, but also information about what kinds of crustal rocks reach great depth in Earth and how profound those depths are.

Regional metamorphic UHP terrains exposed on Earth's surface provide considerable information that is not available from xenoliths. Integrated study by structural geologists, petrologists, and geochronologists has provided considerable data on how the rocks deformed, the pressures and temperatures of metamorphism, and how the deformation and metamorphism varied as a function of space and time. It has been postulated that small UHP terrains that underwent short periods of metamorphism formed early during continent subduction, whereas giant UHP terrains that underwent long periods of metamorphism formed late during continent collision.

=== Formation of UHP rocks ===
Eclogite-facies HP to UHP metamorphic rocks are produced by subduction of crustal rocks to the lower crust to mantle depths for extreme metamorphism at the low thermal gradients of less than 10°C/km. All of these rocks occur at convergent plate margins, and UHP rocks only occur in collisional orogens. There is general agreement that most well-exposed and well-studied UHP terrains were produced by the burial of crustal rocks to mantle depths of >80 km during subduction. Continental margin subduction is well documented in a number of collisional orogens, such as the Dabie orogen where South China Block passive-margin sedimentary and volcanic sequences are preserved, in the Arabian continental margin beneath the Samail ophiolite (in the Al Hajar Mountains, Oman), and in the Australian margin presently subducting beneath the Banda Arc. Sediment subduction occurs beneath volcanoplutonic arcs around the world and is recognized in the compositions of arc lavas. Continental subduction may be underway beneath the Pamir. Subduction erosion also occurs beneath volcanoplutonic arcs around the world, carrying continental rocks to mantle depths at least locally.

=== Exhumation of UHP rocks ===
The specific processes by which UHP terrains were exhumed to Earth's surface appear to have been different in different locations.

If continental lithosphere is subducted because of its attachment to downgoing oceanic lithosphere, the downward slab pull force may exceed the strength of the slab at some time and location, and necking of the slab initiates. The positive buoyancy of the continental slab—in opposition principally to ridge push—can then drive exhumation of the subducting crust at a rate and mode determined by plate geometry and the rheology of the crustal materials. The Norwegian Western Gneiss Region is the archetype for this exhumation mode, which has been termed 'eduction' or subduction inversion.

If a plate undergoing subduction inversion begins to rotate in response to changing boundary conditions or body forces, the rotation may exhume UHP rocks toward crustal levels. This could occur if, for example, the plate is small enough that continental subduction markedly changes the orientation and magnitude of slab pull or if the plate is being consumed by more than one subduction zone pulling in different directions. Such a model has also been proposed for the UHP terrain in eastern Papua New Guinea, where rotation of the Woodlark microplate is causing a rift in the Woodlark Basin.

If a subducting plate consists of a weak buoyant layer atop a stronger negatively buoyant layer, the former will detach at the depth where the buoyancy force exceeds slab pull, and extrude upward as a semi-coherent sheet. This type of delamination and stacking was proposed to explain exhumation of UHP rocks in the Dora Maira massif in Piedmont, Italy, in the Dabie orogen, and in the Himalaya. In addition it was demonstrated with analogue experiments. This mechanism is different from flow in a subduction channel in that the exhuming sheet is strong and remains undeformed. A variant of this mechanism, in which the exhuming material undergoes folding, but not wholescale disruption, was suggested for the Dabie orogen, where exhumation-related stretching lineations and gradients in metamorphic pressure indicate rotation of the exhuming block;

The buoyancy of a microcontinent locally slows the rollback of and steepens the dip of subducting mafic lithosphere. If the mafic lithosphere on either side of the microcontinent continues to roll back, a buoyant portion of the microcontinent may detach, allowing the retarded portion of the mafic slab to roll quickly back, making room for the UHP continental crust to exhume and driving back-arc extension. This model was developed to explain repeated cycles of subduction and exhumation documented in the Aegean and Calabria–Apennine orogens. UHP exhumation by slab rollback has not yet been extensively explored numerically, but it has been reproduced in numerical experiments of Apennine-style collisions.

If continental material is subducted within a confined channel, the material tends to undergo circulation driven by tractions along the base of the channel and the relative buoyancy of rocks inside the channel; the flow can be complex, generating nappe-like or chaotically mixed bodies. The material within the channel can be exhumed if:

1. continuous introduction of new material into the channel driven by traction of the subducting plate pushes old channel material upward;
2. buoyancy in the channel exceeds subduction-related traction and the channel is pushed upward by the asthenospheric mantle intruding between the plates; or
3. a strong indenter squeezes the channel and extrudes the material within.

Buoyancy alone is unlikely to drive exhumation of UHP rocks to Earth's surface, except in oceanic subduction zones. Arrest and spreading of UHP rocks at the Moho (if the overlying plate is continental) is likely unless other forces are available to force the UHP rocks upward. Some UHP terrains might be coalesced material derived from subduction erosion. This model was suggested to explain the North Qaidam UHP terrain in western China. Even subducted sediment may rise as diapirs from the subducting plate and accumulate to form UHP terrains.

Studies of numerical geodynamics suggest that both subducted sediment and crystalline rocks may rise through the mantle wedge diapirically to form UHP terranes. Diapiric rise of a much larger subducted continental body has been invoked to explain the exhumation of the Papua New Guinea UHP terrain. This mechanism was alo used to explain the exhumation of UHP rocks in Greenland. However, the mantle wedge above continental subduction zones is cold like cratons, which do not allow for diapirically ascending of the crustal materials. Foundering of the gravitationally unstable portions of continental lithosphere locally carries quartzofeldspathic rocks into the mantle and may be ongoing beneath the Pamir.

== See also ==
- High pressure terranes along the Bangong-Nujiang Suture Zone
- Eclogitization
- Subduction zone metamorphism
