= Blueschist =

Type of metavolcanic rock

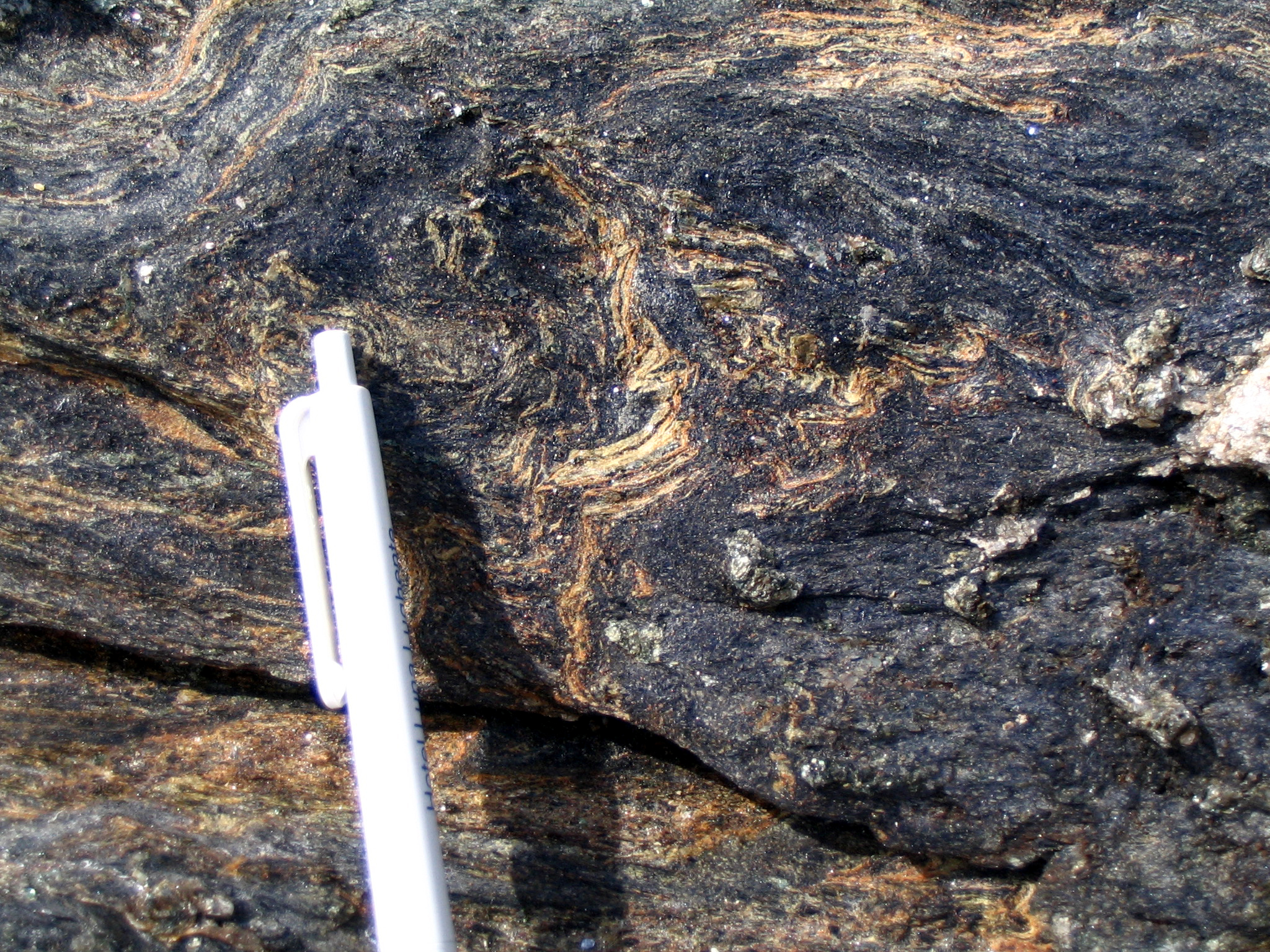
Blueschist on Île de Groix, France

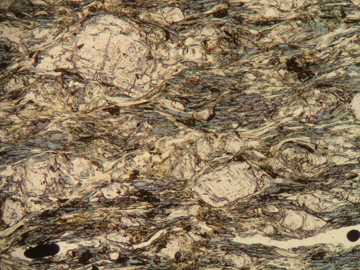
Photomicrograph of a thin section of blueschist facies metamorphosed basalt, from Sivrihisar, Turkey

Blueschist ( /ˈbluːʃɪst/), also called glaucophane schist, is a metavolcanic rock that forms by the metamorphism of basalt and similar rocks at relatively low temperatures (200–500 °C (392–932 °F)) but very high pressure corresponding to a depth of 15–30 km (9.3–18.6 mi). The blue color of the rock comes from the presence of the predominant minerals glaucophane and lawsonite. This combination of low temperature occurring at significant depth can only be explained in the context of plate subduction, followed by exhumation, which accounts for the rarity of this rock.

Blueschists are schists typically found within orogenic belts as terranes of lithology in faulted contact with greenschist or rarely eclogite facies rocks.

== Petrology ==
Blueschist, as a rock type, is defined by the presence of the minerals glaucophane + ( lawsonite or epidote ) +/- jadeite +/- albite or chlorite +/- garnet +/- muscovite in a rock of roughly basaltic composition.
Blueschist often has a lepidoblastic, nematoblastic or schistose rock microstructure defined primarily by chlorite, phengitic white mica, glaucophane, and other minerals with an elongate or platy shape.

Grain size is rarely coarse, as mineral growth is retarded by the swiftness of the rock's metamorphic trajectory and perhaps more importantly, the low temperatures of metamorphism and in many cases the anhydrous state of the basalts. However, porphyritic varieties do occur. Blueschists may appear blue, black, gray, or blue-green in outcrop.

== Blueschist facies ==
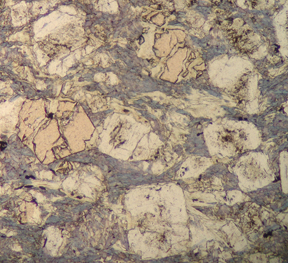
Photomicrograph of garnet-lawsonite-glaucophane blueschist from Sivrihisar, Turkey (Field of view is 3 mm)

Blueschist facies is determined by the particular temperature and pressure conditions required to metamorphose basalt to form blueschist. Felsic rocks and pelitic sediments which are subjected to blueschist facies conditions will form different mineral assemblages than metamorphosed basalt. Thereby, these rocks do not appear blue overall in color.

Blueschist mineralogy varies by rock composition, but the classic equilibrium assemblages of blueschist facies are:

- Basalts: glaucophane + lawsonite and/or epidote + albite + titanite +/- garnet +/- quartz jadeite + quartz - diagnostic of pressures ~> 10 kbar
- Ultramafic rocks: serpentinite/lizardite +/- talc +/- zoisite
- Pelites: Fe-Mg-carpholite +/- chloritoid +/- kyanite + zoisite +/- pargasite or phengite +/- albite +/- quartz +/- talc +/- garnet
- Granites: kyanite +/- paragonite +/- chlorite +/- albite +/- quartz +/- pargasite or phengite
- Calc-silicates: Various
- Limestones and marble: calcite transforms to aragonite at high pressure, but typically reverts to calcite when exhumed

Blueschist facies generally is considered to form under pressures of >0.6 GPa, equivalent to depth of burial in excess of 15–18 km, and at temperatures of between 200 and 500 °C. This is a 'low temperature, high pressure' prograde metamorphic path and is also known as the Franciscan facies series, after the west coast of the United States where these rocks are exposed. Well-exposed blueschists also occur in Greece, Turkey, Japan, New Zealand and New Caledonia.

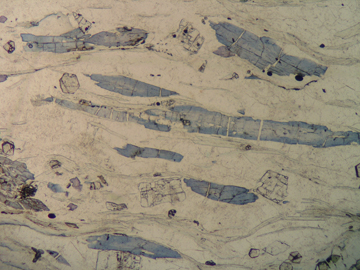
Photomicrograph of blueschist facies quartz sediment, Sivrihisar, Turkey

Continued subduction of blueschist facies oceanic crust will produce eclogite facies assemblages in metamorphosed basalt (garnet + omphacitic clinopyroxene). Rocks which have been subjected to blueschist conditions during a prograde trajectory will gain heat by conduction with hotter lower crustal rocks if they remain at the 15–18 km depth. Blueschist which heats up to greater than 500 °C via this fashion will enter greenschist or eclogite facies temperature-pressure conditions, and the mineral assemblages will metamorphose to reflect the new facies conditions.

Thus in order for blueschist facies assemblages to be seen at the Earth's surface, the rock must be exhumed swiftly enough to prevent total thermal equilibration of the rocks which are under blueschist facies conditions with the typical geothermal gradient.

Blueschists and other high-pressure subduction zone rocks are thought to be exhumed rapidly by flow and/or faulting in accretionary wedges or the upper parts of subducted crust, or may return to the Earth's surface in part owing to buoyancy if the metabasaltic rocks are associated with low-density continental crust (marble, metapelite, and other rocks of continental margins).

It has been held that the absence of blueschist dating to before the Neoproterozoic Era indicates that currently exhumed rocks never reached blueschist facies at subduction zones before 1,000 million years ago. This assertion is arguably wrong because the earliest oceanic crust would have contained more magnesium than today's crust and, therefore, would have formed greenschist-like rocks at blueschist facies.

== History and etymology ==
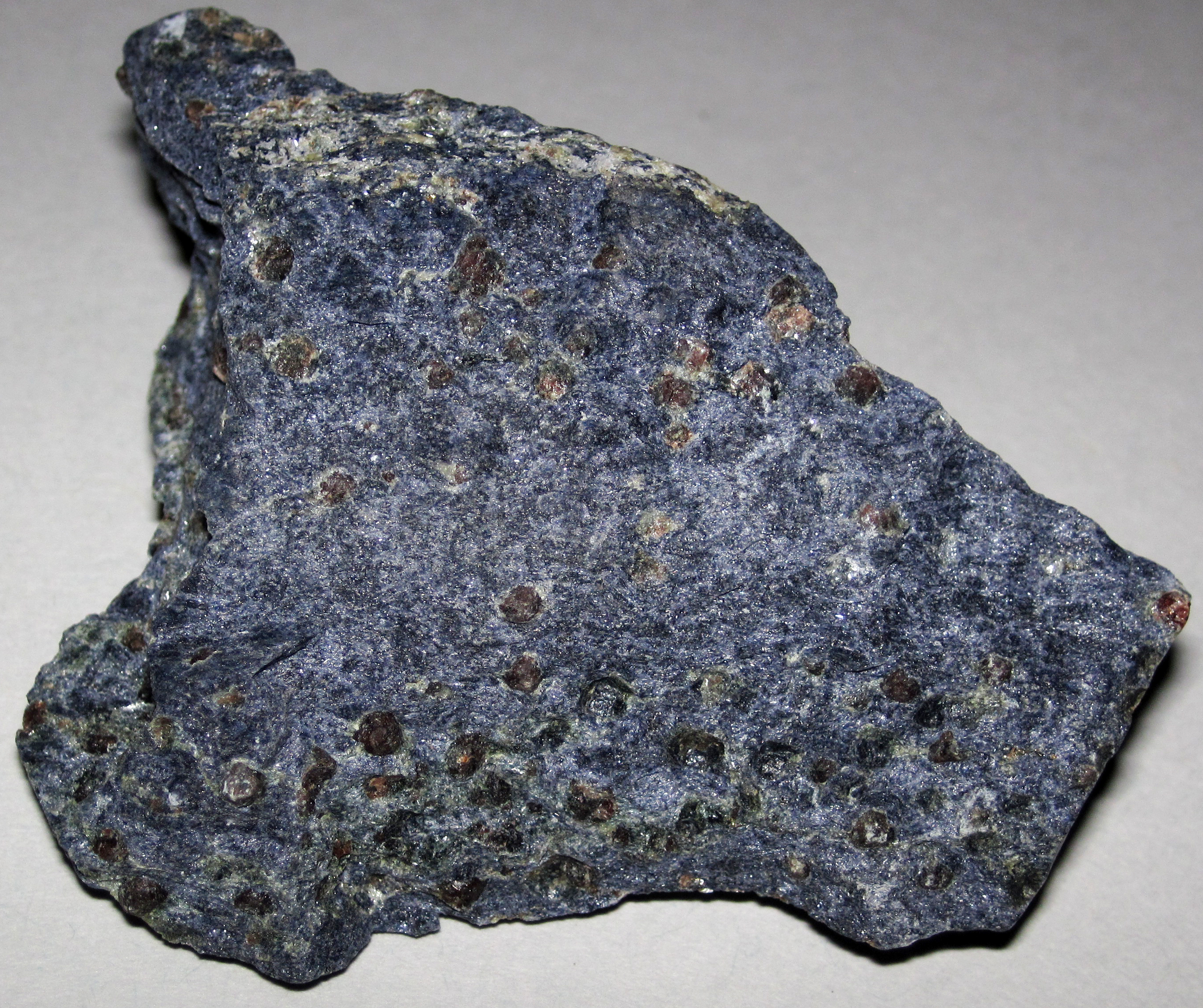
Garnetiferous blueschist, an uncommon rock (Ward Creek, Sonoma County, California)

In Minoan Crete blueschist and greenschist were used to pave streets and courtyards between 1650 and 1600 BC. These rocks were likely quarried in Agia Pelagia on the north coast of central Crete.

In 1962, Edgar Bailey of the U.S. Geological Survey, introduced the concept of "blueschist" into the subject of metamorphic geology. His carefully constructed definition established the pressure and temperature conditions which produce this type of metamorphism.

== See also ==
- List of minerals
- List of rock types
- Metamorphism
