= Lawsonite =

Sorosilicate mineral

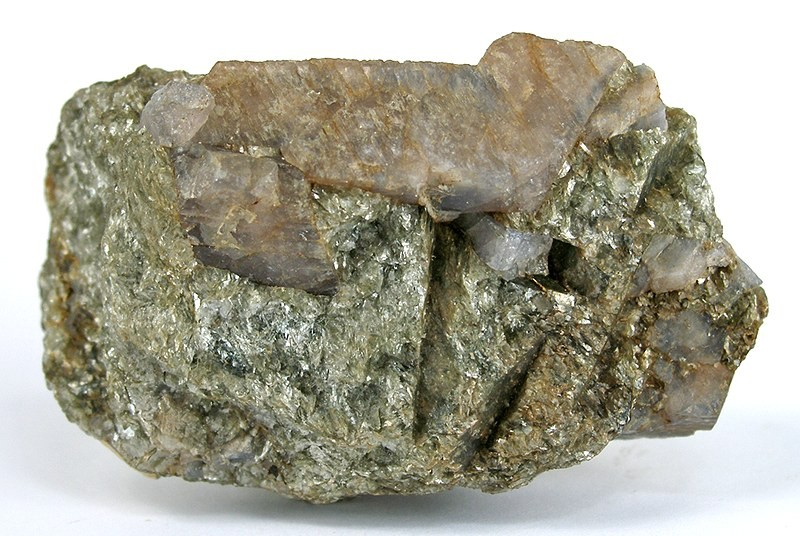
- Sample from the type locality in California with two elongated, lustrous and translucent crystals of pastel pink, lawsonite in mica schist. Size: 6.1 cm × 3.2 cm × 2.5 cm (2.4 in × 1.3 in × 1.0 in)

General
- Category: Sorosilicate
- Formula: CaAl_{2}Si_{2}O_{7}(OH)_{2}·H_{2}O
- IMA symbol: Lws
- Strunz classification: 9.BE.05
- Crystal system: Orthorhombic
- Crystal class: Dipyramidal (mmm); H-M symbol: (2/m 2/m 2/m)
- Space group: Cmcm
- Unit cell: a = 5.847, b = 8.79, c = 13.128 [Å]; Z = 4

Identification
- Color: Colorless, white, pale blue to grayish blue
- Crystal habit: Commonly prismatic, tabular; also granular, massive
- Twinning: Common on {101} lamellar
- Cleavage: Perfect on {100} and {010}, imperfect on {101}
- Tenacity: Brittle
- Mohs scale hardness: 7.5
- Luster: Vitreous, greasy
- Streak: White
- Diaphaneity: Translucent
- Specific gravity: 3.05–3.12
- Optical properties: Biaxial (+)
- Refractive index: n_{α} = 1.665 n_{β} = 1.672–1.676 n_{γ} = 1.684–1.686
- Birefringence: δ = 0.019–0.021
- Pleochroism: Weak; X = blue, pale brownish yellow; Y = deep bluish green, yellowish green; Z = colorless, yellowish
- 2V angle: Measured: 84°–85°
- Dispersion: Strong, r > v

Lawsonite is a hydrous calcium aluminium sorosilicate mineral with formula CaAl_{2}Si_{2}O_{7}(OH)_{2}·H_{2}O. Lawsonite crystallizes in the orthorhombic system in prismatic, often tabular crystals. Crystal twinning is common. It forms transparent to translucent colorless, white, pink, and bluish to pinkish grey glassy to greasy crystals. Refractive indices are nα = 1.665, nβ = 1.672 – 1.676, and nγ = 1.684 – 1.686. It is typically almost colorless in thin section, but some lawsonite is pleochroic from colorless to pale yellow to pale blue, depending on orientation. The mineral has a Mohs hardness of 7.5 and a specific gravity of 3.09. It has perfect cleavage in two directions and a brittle fracture. Not to be confused with Larsonite, a fossiliferous jasper mined in Nevada.

Lawsonite is a metamorphic mineral typical of the blueschist facies. It also occurs as a secondary mineral in altered gabbro and diorite. Associate minerals include epidote, titanite, glaucophane, garnet and quartz. It is an uncommon constituent of eclogite. Its scarcity in eclogite that has been exhumed to the Earth's surface does not reflect its abundance at depth in subduction zones but rather the fact that lawsonite is easily replaced by other minerals.

Lawsonite was first described in 1895 for occurrences on Ring Mountain of the Tiburon peninsula, Marin County, California and was named after geologist Andrew Lawson (1861–1952) of the University of California by two of Lawson's graduate students, Charles Palache and Frederick Leslie Ransome.

== Composition ==
Lawsonite is a metamorphic silicate mineral related chemically and structurally to the epidote group of minerals. It is close to the ideal composition of CaAl_{2}Si_{2}O_{7}(OH)_{2}·H_{2}O, giving it a close chemical composition with anorthite CaAl_{2}Si_{2}O_{8} (its anhydrous equivalent), yet lawsonite has greater density and a different Al coordination (Comodi et al., 1996). The substantial amount of water bound in lawsonite's crystal structure is released during its breakdown to denser minerals during prograde metamorphism. This means lawsonite is capable of conveying appreciable water to great depths in subducting oceanic lithosphere (Clarke et al., 2006). Experimentation on lawsonite to vary its responses at different temperatures and different pressures is among its most studied aspects, for it is these qualities that affect its abilities to carry water down to mantle depths, similar to other OH-containing phases like antigorite, talc, phengite, staurolite, and epidote (Comodi et al., 1996).

== Geologic occurrence ==
Lawsonite is a very widespread mineral and has attracted considerable interest because of its importance as a marker of moderate to high pressure (6,000–25,000 bar) and low temperature (300–600 °C) conditions in nature (Clarke et al., 2006). This mainly occurs along continental margins (subduction zones) such as those found in: the Franciscan Formation in California at Reed Station, Tiburon Peninsula of Marin County, California; schists in New Zealand, New Caledonia, and from other points in the circum-Pacific orogenic belt; the Piedmont metamorphic rocks of Italy; China, Japan, Greece, and Turkey.

== Crystal structure ==
Though lawsonite and anorthite have similar compositions, their structures are quite different. While anorthite has a tetrahedral coordination with aluminium (Al substitutes for Si in feldspars), lawsonite has an octahedral coordination with Al, making it an orthorhombic sorosilicate with a space group of Cmcm which consists of Si_{2}O_{7} Groups and O, OH, F, and H_{2}O with cations in [4] and/or >[4] coordination. This is much more similar to the epidote group which lawsonite is often found in conjunction with, which are also sorosilicates because their structure consists of two connected SiO_{4} tetrahedra plus connecting cation. The water contained in its structure is made possible by cavities formed by rings of two Al octahedral and two Si_{2}O_{7} groups, each containing an isolated water molecule and calcium atom. The hydroxyl units are bound to the edge-sharing Al octahedral (Baur, 1978).

== Physical properties ==
Lawsonite has crystal habits of orthorhombic prismatic, which are crystals shaped like slender prisms, or tubular figures, which form dimensions that are thin in one direction, both with two perfect cleavages. This crystal is transparent to translucent and varies in color from white to pale blue to colorless with a white streak and a vitreous or greasy luster. It has a relatively low specific gravity of 3.1 g/cm^{3}, and a pretty high hardness of 7.5 on the Mohs scale of hardness, slightly higher than quartz. Under the microscope, lawsonite can be seen as blue, yellow, or colorless under plane polarized light while the stage is rotated. Lawsonite has three refractive indices of n_{α} = 1.665, n_{β} = 1.672–1.676, and n_{γ} = 1.684–1.686, which produces a birefringence of δ = 0.019–0.021 and an optically positive biaxial interference figure.

== Significance ==
Lawsonite is a significant metamorphic mineral as it can be used as an index mineral for high pressure conditions. Index minerals are used in geology to determine the degree of metamorphism a rock has experienced. New metamorphic minerals form through solid-state cation exchanges following changing pressure and temperature conditions imposed upon the protolith (pre-metamorphosed rock). This new mineral that is produced in the metamorphosed rock is the index mineral, which indicates the minimum pressure and temperature the protolith must have achieved in order for that mineral to form.

Lawsonite is known to form in high pressure, low temperature conditions, most commonly found in subduction zones where cold oceanic crust subducts down oceanic trenches into the mantle (Comodi et al., 1996). The initially low temperature of the slab and fluids taken down with it depress isotherms and keep the slab much colder than the surrounding mantle, allowing for these unusual high pressure, low temperature conditions. Glaucophane, garnet, phengite, and zoisite or other epidote-group minerals are other common minerals in blueschist. Blueschists that form from basaltic parent rocks contain either lawsonite or epidote. The coexistence of glaucophane + lawsonite or epidote is diagnostic of the blueschist facies.

Lawsonite also occurs in eclogite, although it is rarely preserved in the geologic record. A common assemblage in lawsonite eclogite is garnet + omphacite + lawsonite + phengite + rutile ± glaucophane. Lawsonite occurs as inclusions in garnet, as a matrix phase, and in veins, providing a detailed history of subduction and exhumation.

Lawsonite most commonly occurs in metabasaltic rocks but also forms in metasedimentary rocks such as metachert and metacarbonate rocks. It also forms in rocks that form by metasomatism during subduction, such as in the contact zone of ultramafic rocks (serpentinite) and other rocks.

In addition to being a major host for water (11.5 wt%) in its crystal structure, lawsonite contains significant amounts of trace elements such as uranium, thorium, lead, strontium, and rare-earth elements relative to other minerals in blueschists and eclogites. Some lawsonite also contains iron, chromium, and titanium. The abundance of these elements typically varies within single crystals.

The breakdown of lawsonite has been invoked as one mechanism by which intermediate-depth earthquakes are generated in subduction zones.
