= Eclogitization =

Tectonic process in which eclogite is formed

Fig. 1 Metamorphic facies (bodies of rock with specific characteristics). Note the eclogite facies, which forms at the highest pressures.

Eclogitization is the tectonic process in which eclogite, a high-pressure metamorphic facies, is formed. This leads to an increase in the density of regions of Earth's crust, which leads to changes in plate motion at convergent boundaries (where rock sinks beneath other rock).

== Relationship to slab pull ==
There is the argument that collision between two continents should slow down because of continental buoyancy, and that for convergence to continue, it should do so at a new subduction zone where oceanic crust can be consumed. Certain areas such as the Alps, Zagros, and Himalayas (where continental collisions have continued for tens of millions of years, in the middle of land, creating mountain ranges) contradict this argument, and have led geologists to propose a continental undertow that continues subduction. This continental undertow is explained by the slab pull concept. Slab pull is the concept that plate motion is driven by the weight of cool, dense plates and that heavier plates will begin to subduct. Once a descending slab is disconnected there must be a force that continues subduction. Eclogitization is the mechanism for continuing subduction after slab detachment in a subduction zone.

== Geologic setting and effect of eclogitization ==
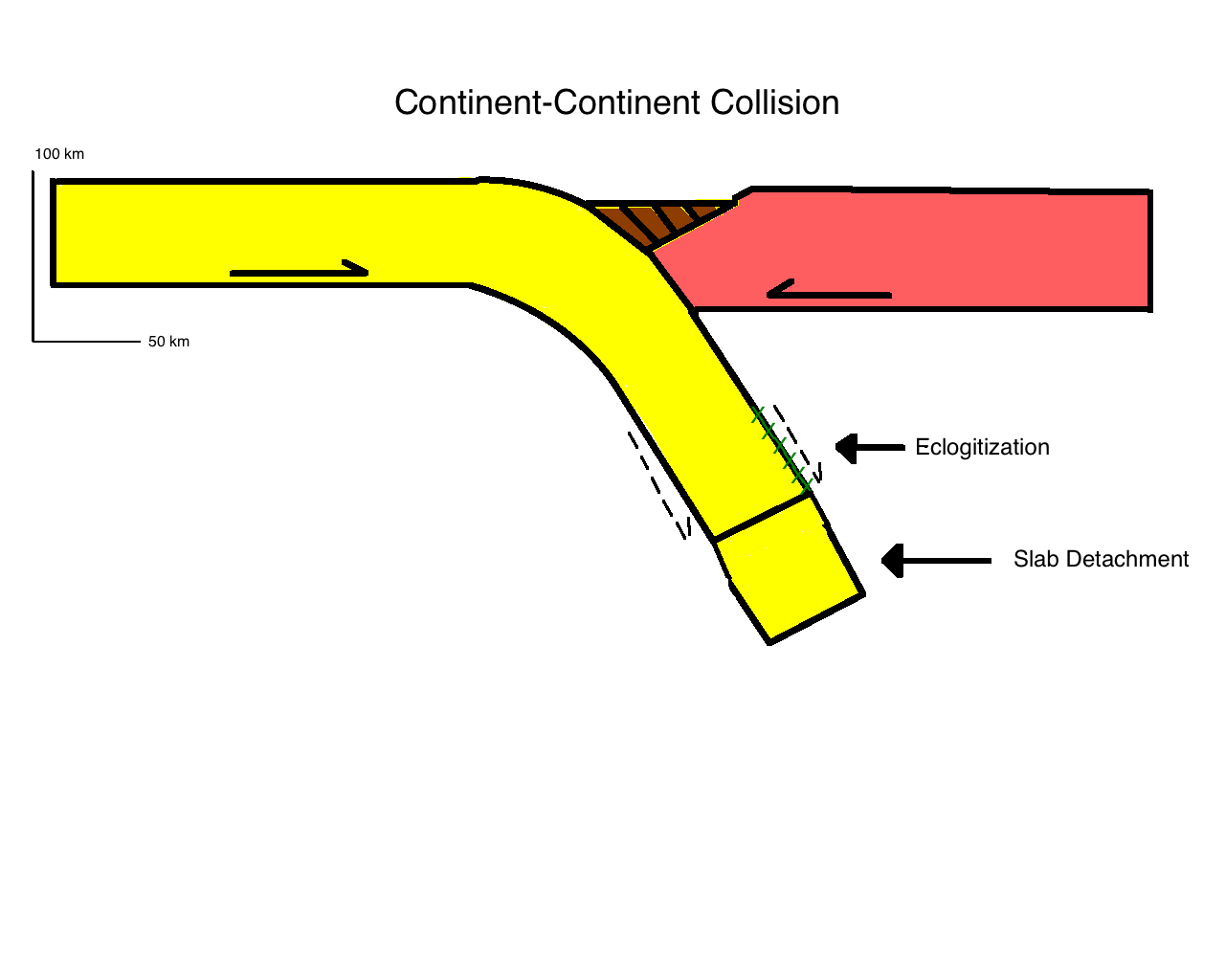
Fig 2. Eclogitization Schematic showing slab detachment within mantle and area of eclogitization and densification of subducting crust, which is a possible explanation for continental "undertow"

Eclogitization typically occurs at two locations in a collisional fold mountain (fig 2): in the subduction of crust and at the base of the crustal root of the overriding crust. At these zones high pressures are reached, as well as medium to high temperatures, and eclogitization commences. Metamorphic re-crystallization during burial can lead to a significant density increase (up to 10% in the case of eclogitization), meaning approximately 300–600 kg/m^{3} of crustal rocks and continental lower crust and oceanic crust reach higher density than the mantle.

This density increase acts as the main driver in the convection of Earth's mantle. It also explains the disconnection of a tectonic unit from the descending lithosphere, subsequent continuation of subduction, and the exhumation following subduction.

== Localities ==
Eclogitization is difficult to study because the rocks are rare: eclogites constitute only a very minor volume of continental basement exposed today at Earth's surface. The few areas that are available to study eclogitization and view eclogites include garnet peridotites in Greenland and in other ophiolite complexes. Examples are also known in Saxony, Bavaria, Carinthia, Norway and Newfoundland. A few eclogites also occur in the northwest highlands of Scotland and the Massif Central of France. Glaucophane-eclogites occur in Italy and the Pennine Alps. Occurrences exist in western North America, including the southwest and the Franciscan Formation of the California Coast Ranges. Transitional granulite-eclogite facies granitoid, felsic volcanics, mafic rocks and granulites occur in the Musgrave Block of the Petermann Orogeny, central Australia. Recently, coesite- and glaucophane-bearing eclogites have been found in the northwestern Himalaya. Although limited localities are available to study, these areas provide the crucial samples to understand exhumation as well as continued subduction by continental "undertow."

== Fluid influence on eclogitization ==
Fluids, rather than pressure and temperature conditions, are the key thing that makes the process of eclogitization, and the delamination (falling away) of crustal roots, in collisional orogens (fold mountains), possible. Partially eclogitized amphibolites, gabbros, and granulites from the Western Gneiss Region of Norway, the Marun-Keu Complex in the polar Ural Mountains, and the Dabie-Sulu belt in China demonstrate that fluid is required for complete eclogitization. In these locations, eclogite occurs alongside unreacted rocks subjected to the same temperatures and pressures, with the eclogite forming where fluid can reach, for example along fractures.

An influx of fluids into the subduction zone or from the underlying mantle is vital for these metamorphic reactions to continue – fluids play a much more significant role in eclogite metamorphism than either temperature or pressure. Without H_{2}O, reactions will not proceed to completion, leaving metamorphic rocks metastable (stuck in an incomplete state) at unexpectedly high temperatures and pressures. Without the metamorphosis of less dense rocks to eclogite, which is eclogitization, continental "undertow" may be hindered, and subduction may be slowed down, or even eventually stop.

== Field studies and simulations ==
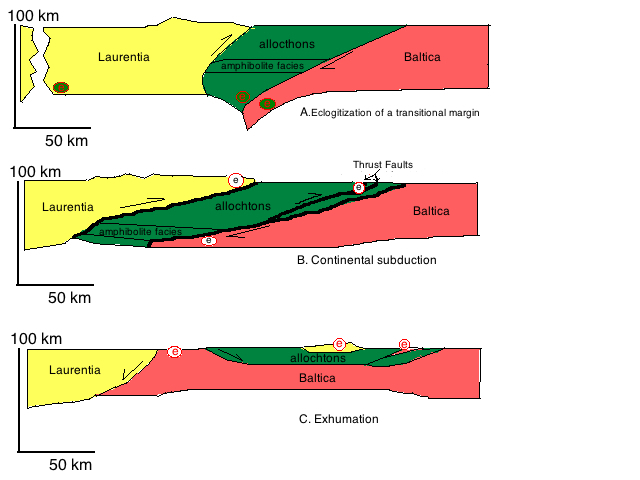
Fig. 3 Cartoon Cross Section depicting tectonic evolution of eclogite terrain i.e. Laurentia and Baltic collision A)Early collisional phase with initial eclogitization of transitional margin between Laurentia and Baltica B)Continental Subduction C)Extension and exhumation where eclogites become exposed. Green eclogite symbols represent areas of active eclogitization and white symbols represent eclogites passing through retrograde conditions.

- The Western Gneiss Region and the Bergen Arc of Western Norway: Known as one of the largest eclogitized pieces of continental crust that was exhumed during the Caledonian orogeny, studies here have shown that recrystallization of the eclogite facies is also accompanied with a significant reduction in rock's strength. This is shown by a localization of shear zones where the host granulites have been transformed to eclogites. The main point of this study was to explore the kinematics of syn-eclogite deformation in the Bergen arc which suggested that eclogitization is ultimately responsible for the separation of tectonic units from the descending lithosphere. Furthermore, despite density increase, studies show that eclogitization may trigger exhumation due to the reduction in rock strength and requires that eclogitization is not complete. This is especially true in basic and intermediate lithologies that may become denser than the mantle in cases of complete recrystallization which is shown by a localization of shear zones where the host granulites have been transformed to eclogites. Thus the Bergen Arc provides an excellent example of eclogitization's role in slab detachment and initiation of exhumation in a continental subduction region.
- Mechanical models: Simulations with viscous (ductile) and plastic (brittle) rheologies have been used to investigate the effect of eclogitization on the dynamics of convergence. A plethora of geologic settings have been modeled such as intracontinental deformation, subduction, and continental collision to determine the density and buoyancy impact of eclogitization. Instances where there was lithospheric shortening, models suggested that metamorphic transformations, such as eclogitization, have little or no influence and instead initial deformation occurs due to presence or absence of weak zones in the crust. However, in other models different results were observed, where lithospheric bending or subduction is obtained, material from the lower continental crust and, in the case of oceanic subduction, the oceanic crust is entrained to great depths (more than 100 km). In all of these cases eclogitization was a factor in one way or another, including the following:
1. The force required for convergence at a constant velocity is significantly reduced when eclogitization has taken place, compared to models without eclogitization.
2. Models have shown that eclogitization does not impact subduction initiation, but eclogitized oceanic crust contributes to the slab negative buoyancy and could help the subduction of young oceanic lithosphere.
3. The consequences of eclogitization depend heavily on the temperature within the Mohorovičić discontinuity (MOHO) and decoupling in the crust.
