= Thuringite =

Variety of the chlorite mineral chamosite

Thuringite is a variety of the chlorite mineral chamosite, a hydrous iron and aluminium silicate mineral. It is usually found as small green scales deposited on other minerals, particularly to which it is closely related.

It is named after the German state of Thuringia.
