= Frederick Leslie Ransome =

British-born American geologist

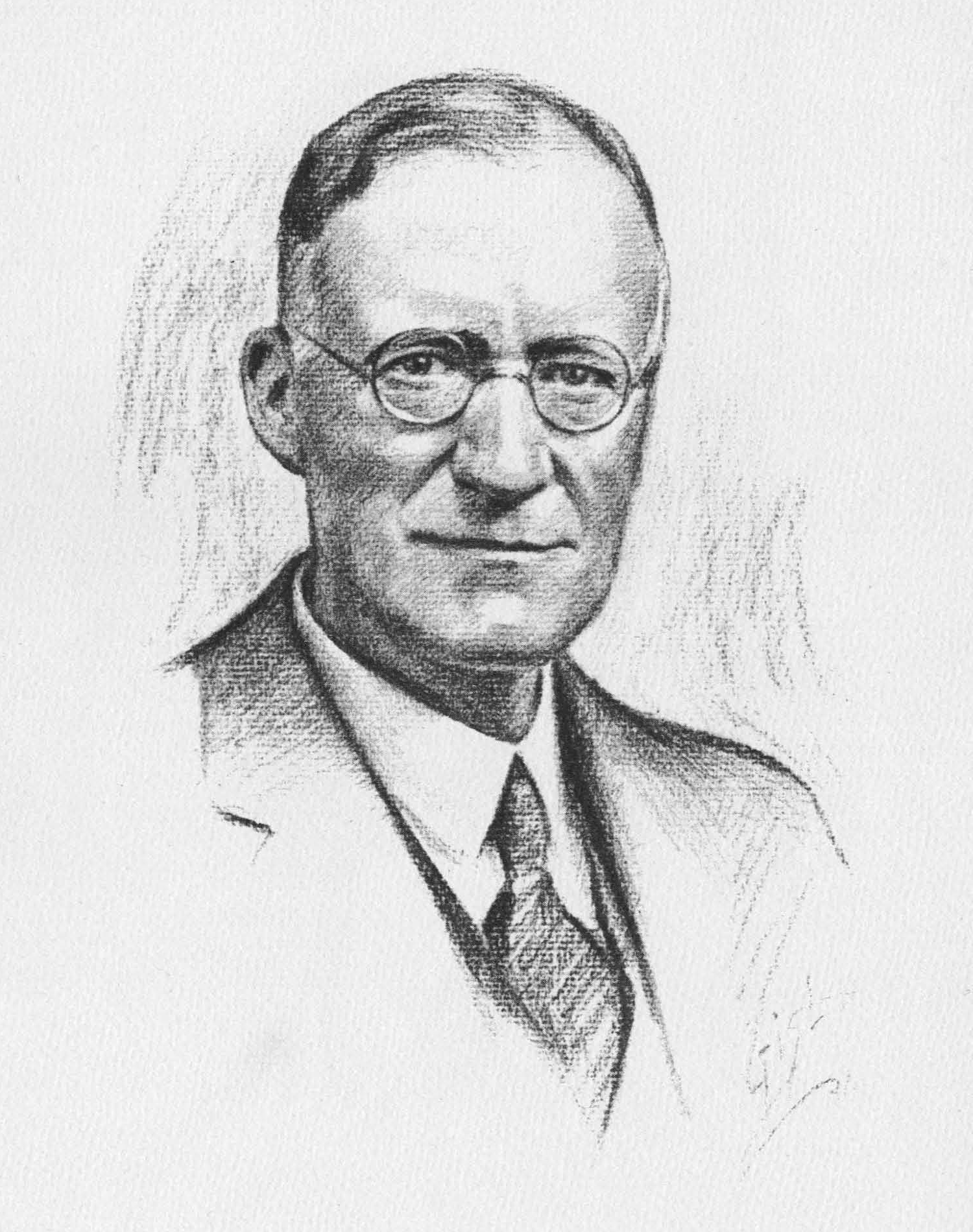
1931 drawing of Frederick Leslie Ransome

Frederick Leslie Ransome, Ph.D. (1868–1935) was a British-born American geologist.

Ransome was born in Greenwich, England and educated at the University of California (S.B., 1893; Ph.D., 1896).

Ransome described and named the mineral Lawsonite after Andrew Lawson. Ransome was employed by the United States Geological Survey. Ransome's many official reports and bulletins dealt mainly with phases of economic geology. Ransome helped found the journal Economic Geology in 1905, and was associate editor of the Journal of the Washington Academy of Sciences. Ransome was a member of the National Academy of Sciences, and served as NAS Treasurer in 1919. He was elected to the American Philosophical Society in 1935.

== Selected publications ==
- "The association of alunite with gold in the Goldfield district, Nevada" (1907)
- "The Geology and Ore Deposits of the Bisbee Quadrangle, Arizona", 1904, US Geological Survey
- "Geology and gold deposits of the Cripple Creek district, Colorado" (1906) with Waldemar Lindgren. US Geological Survey
- "The geology and ore deposits of the Coeur d'Alene district, Idaho" (1908) with Frank Cathcart Calkins, US Geological Survey
- "Geology and Ore Deposits of the Bullfrog District, Nevada" (1910) with William Harvey Emmons and George H. Garrey, US Geological Survey
- "Report of progress in the geological resurvey of the Cripple Creek district, Colorado" (1904) with Waldemar Lindgren
