= Eclogite =

Metamorphic rock formed under high pressure

- Metamorphic rock
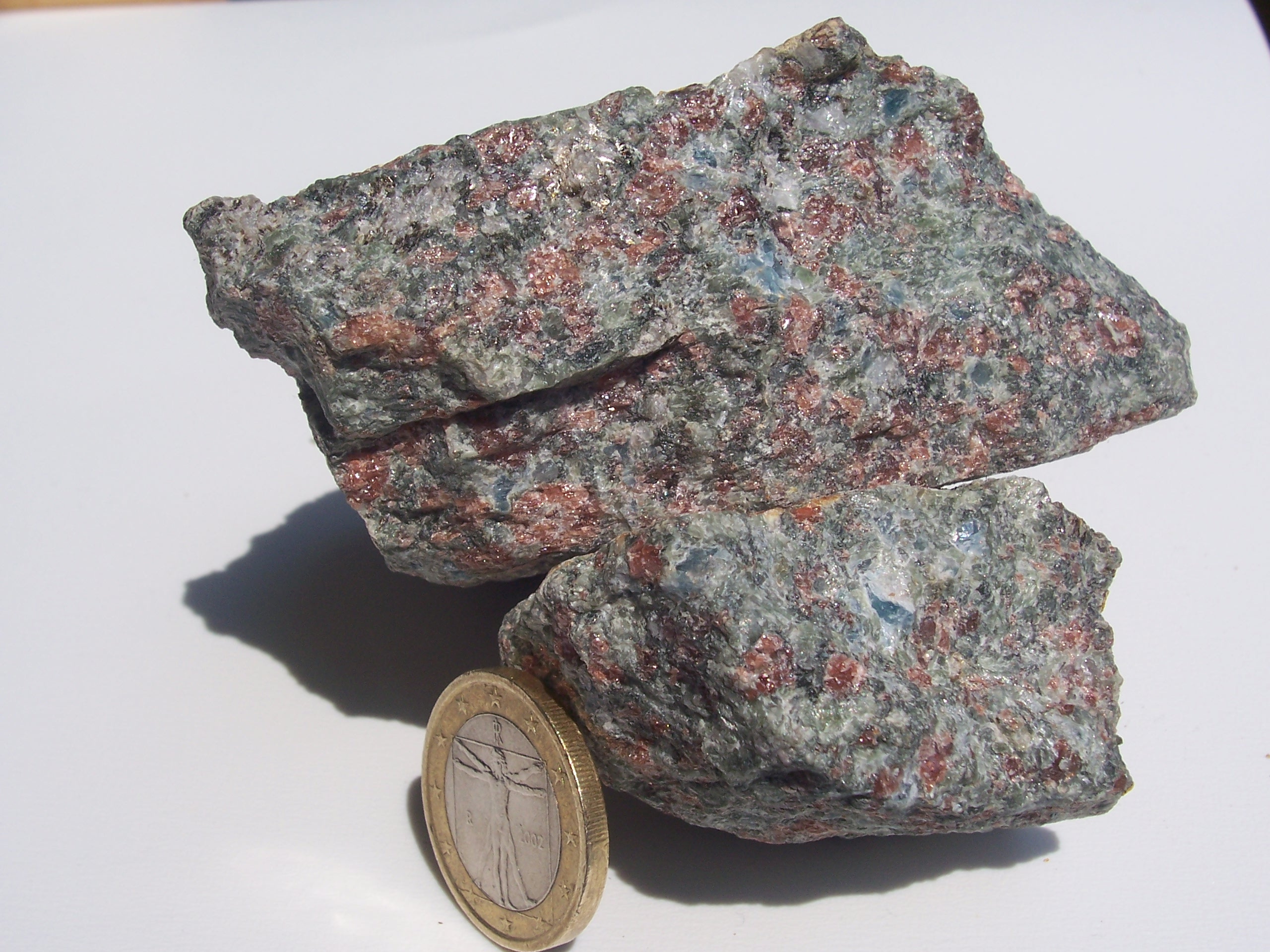
- Eclogite from Norway with a garnet (red) and omphacite (greyish-green) groundmass. The sky-blue crystals are kyanite. Minor white quartz is present, presumably from the recrystallization of coesite. A few gold-white phengite patches can be seen at the top. A 23 millimetres (0.91 in) coin added for scale.

Composition
- Classification: mafic
- Primary: Omphacite, pyrope, amphibole, mica
- Secondary: Kyanite, paragonite, orthopyroxene, rutile, quartz, olivine
- Texture: granoblastic to heteroblastic

Eclogite ( /ˈɛklədʒaɪt/) is a metamorphic rock containing garnet (almandine-pyrope) hosted in a matrix of sodium-rich pyroxene (omphacite). Accessory minerals include kyanite, rutile, quartz, lawsonite, coesite, amphibole, phengite, paragonite, zoisite, dolomite, corundum and, rarely, diamond. The chemistry of primary and accessory minerals is used to classify three types of eclogite (A, B, and C). The broad range of eclogitic compositions has led to a longstanding debate on the origin of eclogite xenoliths as subducted, altered oceanic crust.

The name eclogite is derived from the Ancient Greek word for 'choice' (εκλογή, eklogḗ), meaning 'chosen rock' on account of its perceived beauty. It was first named by René Just Haüy in 1822 in the second edition of his work Traité de minéralogie.

== Origins ==
Eclogites typically result from high to ultrahigh pressure metamorphism of mafic rock at low thermal gradients of <10 °C/km (29 °F/mi) as it is subducted to the lower crust to upper mantle depths in a subduction zone.

=== Classification ===
Eclogites are defined as bi-mineralic, broadly basaltic rocks which have been classified into Groups A, B and C based on the chemistry of their primary mineral phases, garnet and clinopyroxene. The classification distinguishes each group based on the jadeite content of clinopyroxene and pyrope in garnet. The rocks are gradationally less mafic (as defined by SiO_{2} and MgO) from group A to C, where the least mafic Group C contains higher alkali contents.

The transitional nature between groups A, B and C correlates with their mode of emplacement at the surface. Group A derive from cratonic regions of Earth's crust, brought to the surface as xenoliths from depths greater than 150 km during kimberlite eruptions. Group B show strong compositional overlap with Group A, but are found as lenses or pods surrounded by peridotitic mantle material. Group C are commonly found between layers of mica or glaucophane schist, primarily exemplified by the New Caledonia tectonic block and off the coast of California.

=== Surface versus mantle origin ===
The broad range in composition has led a longstanding debate on the origin of eclogite xenoliths as either mantle or surface derived, where the latter is associated with the gabbro to eclogite transition as a major driving force for subduction.

Group A eclogite xenoliths remain the most enigmatic in terms of their origin due to metasomatic overprinting of their original composition. Models proposing a primary surface origin as seafloor protoliths strongly rely on the wide range in oxygen isotope composition, which overlaps with obducted oceanic crust, such as the Ibra section of the Samail ophiolite. The variation found in some eclogite xenoliths at the Roberts Victor kimberlite pipe are a result of hydrothermal alteration of basalt on the seafloor. This process is attributed to both low- and high-temperature seawater exchange, resulting in large fractionations in oxygen isotope space relative to the upper mantle value typical of mid ocean ridge basalt glasses. Other mechanisms proposed for the origin of Group A eclogite xenoliths rely on a cumulate model, where garnet and clinopyroxene bulk compositions derive from residues of partial melting within the mantle. Support of this process is result of metasomatic overprinting of the original oxygen isotope composition, driving them back towards the mantle range.

== Eclogite facies ==
This facies reflects metamorphism at high pressure (at or over 12kbar) and moderately high to very high temperatures. The pressures exceed those of greenschist, blueschist, amphibolite or granulite facies.

Eclogites containing lawsonite (a hydrous calcium-aluminium silicate) are rarely exposed at Earth's surface, although they are predicted from experiments and thermal models to form during normal subduction of oceanic crust at depths between about 45–300 km (28–186 mi).

== Importance ==
Photomicrograph of a thin section of eclogite from Turkey. Green omphacite (+ late chlorite) + pink garnet + blue glaucophane + colorless phengite.

=== Formation of igneous rocks from eclogite ===
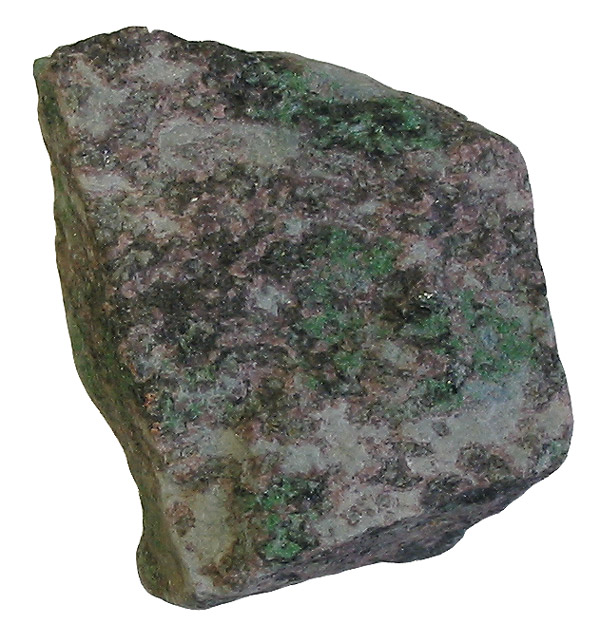
Eclogite

Partial melting of eclogite has been modeled to produce tonalite-trondhjemite-granodiorite melts. Eclogite-derived melts may be common in the mantle, and contribute to volcanic regions where unusually large volumes of magma are erupted. The eclogite melt may then react with enclosing peridotite to produce pyroxenite, which in turn melts to produce basalt.

== Distribution ==
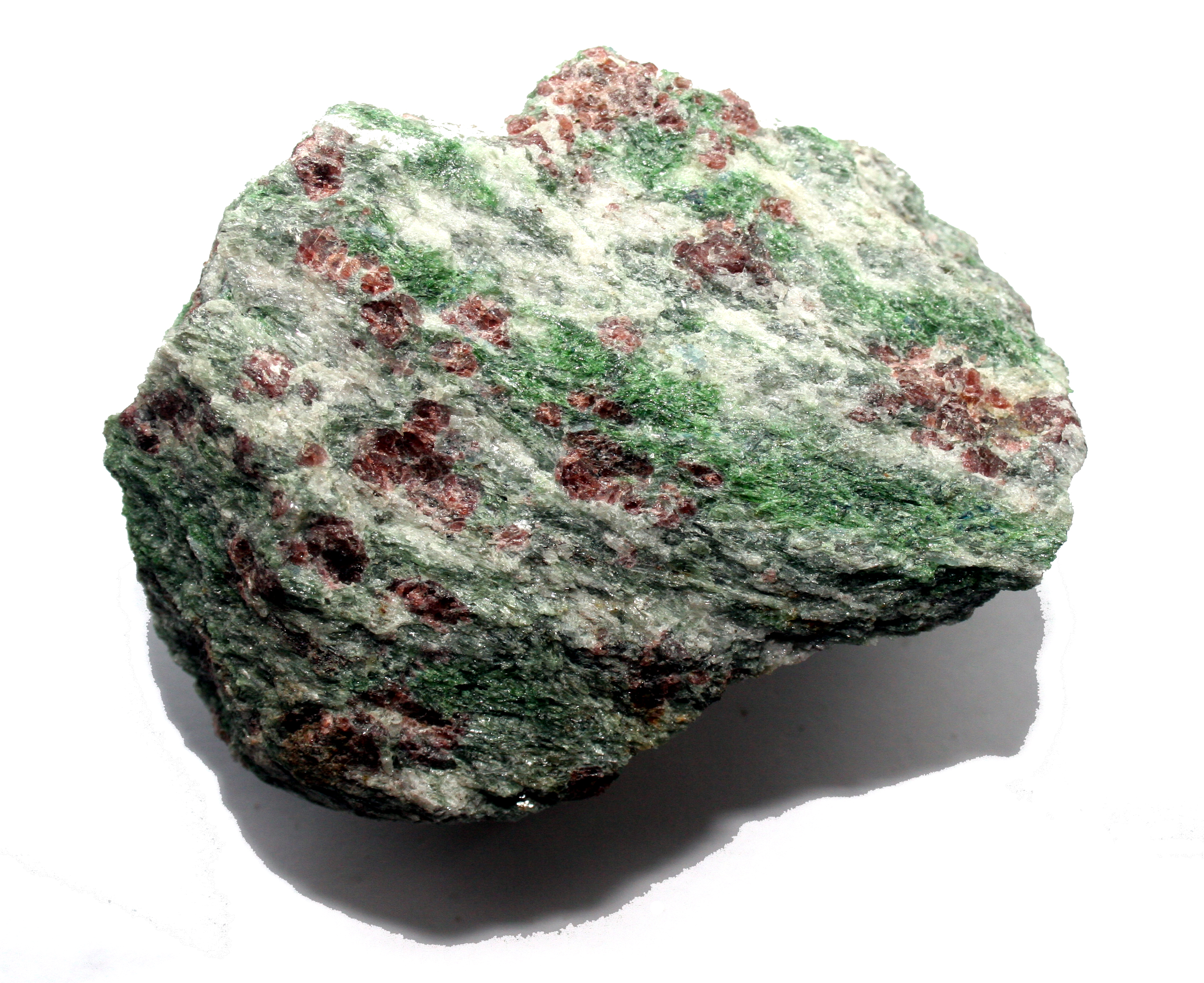
Eclogite from Almenning, Norway. The red-brown mineral is garnet, green omphacite and white quartz.

Occurrences exist in western North America, including the southwest and the Franciscan Formation of the California Coast Ranges. The Mars Hill terrane, an exotic terrane in the southern Appalachian orogen in the eastern United States also exposes eclogite. (Merschat, et al., 2012) Transitional granulite-eclogite facies granitoid, felsic volcanics, mafic rocks and granulites occur in the Musgrave Block of the Petermann Orogeny, central Australia. Coesite- and glaucophane-bearing eclogites have been found in the northwestern Himalaya. The oldest coesite-bearing eclogites are about 650 and 620 million years old and they are located in Brazil and Mali, respectively.
