= Glaucophane =

Inosilicate mineral

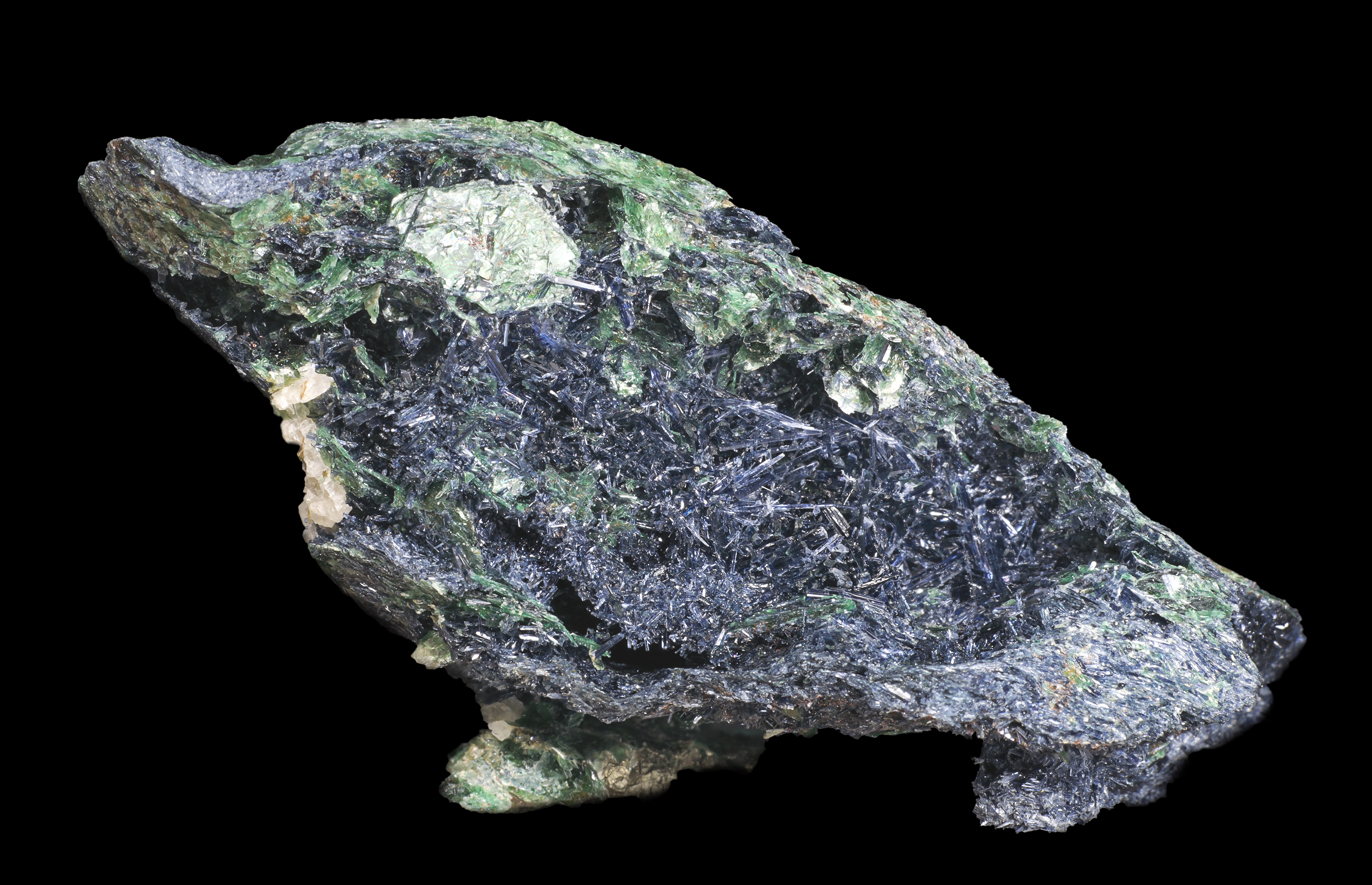
- Glaucophane with fuchsite (white oval)

General
- Category: Inosilicates; Sodic amphibole group
- Formula: ☐Na_{2}(Mg_{3}Al_{2})Si_{8}O_{22}(OH)_{2}
- IMA symbol: Gln
- Strunz classification: 9.DE.25
- Crystal system: Monoclinic
- Crystal class: Prismatic (2/m) (same H-M symbol)
- Space group: C2/m

Identification
- Color: Gray, navy blue, lavender-blue
- Crystal habit: slender long prisms, Massive granular to columnar
- Cleavage: Good on [110] and on [001]
- Fracture: Brittle – conchoidal
- Mohs scale hardness: 6.0–6.5
- Luster: Vitreous – pearly
- Streak: Grayish blue
- Diaphaneity: Translucent
- Specific gravity: 3–3.15
- Optical properties: Biaxial (−)
- Refractive index: nα = 1.606 – 1.637 nβ = 1.615 – 1.650 nγ = 1.627 – 1.655
- Birefringence: δ = 0.021
- Pleochroism: Strong
- Dispersion: Strong

Glaucophane is a mineral and a mineral group belonging to the sodic amphibole supergroup of the double chain inosilicates, with the chemical formula Na_{2}(Mg_{3}Al_{2})Si_{8}O_{22}(OH)_{2}.

Glaucophane crystallizes in the monoclinic system.

== Name ==
Glaucophane is named for its typical blue color. In Greek, glaucophane means "blue appearing". As the major mineral component, it is glaucophane's color that gives the "blueschist" metamorphic rock type its name.

== Characteristics ==
The blue color is very diagnostic for this species. Glaucophane, along with the closely related mineral riebeckite, to which it forms a series with, and their intermediate crossite, are the only well known amphiboles that are commonly blue. Glaucophane forms a solid solution series with ferroglaucophane (Na_{2}(Fe,Mg)_{3}Al_{2}Si_{8}O_{22}(OH)_{2}). Glaucophane is the magnesium-rich endmember and ferroglaucophane is the iron-rich endmember.

Ferroglaucophane is similar to glaucophane but is slightly denser and hence increased specific gravity. The two endmembers are indistinguishable in hand specimens and are strongly pleochroic. Glaucophane's hardness is 5–6 and its specific gravity is approximately 3–3.2.

== Occurrence ==
The blueschist metamorphic facies gets its name from abundant blue minerals glaucophane and lawsonite. Glaucophane generally forms in blueschist metamorphic rocks of gabbroic or basaltic composition that are rich in sodium and have experienced low temperature-high pressure metamorphism such as would occur along a subduction zone.

This material has undergone intense pressure and moderate heat as it was subducted downward toward the mantle. Glaucophane is also found in eclogites that have undergone retrograde metamorphism.

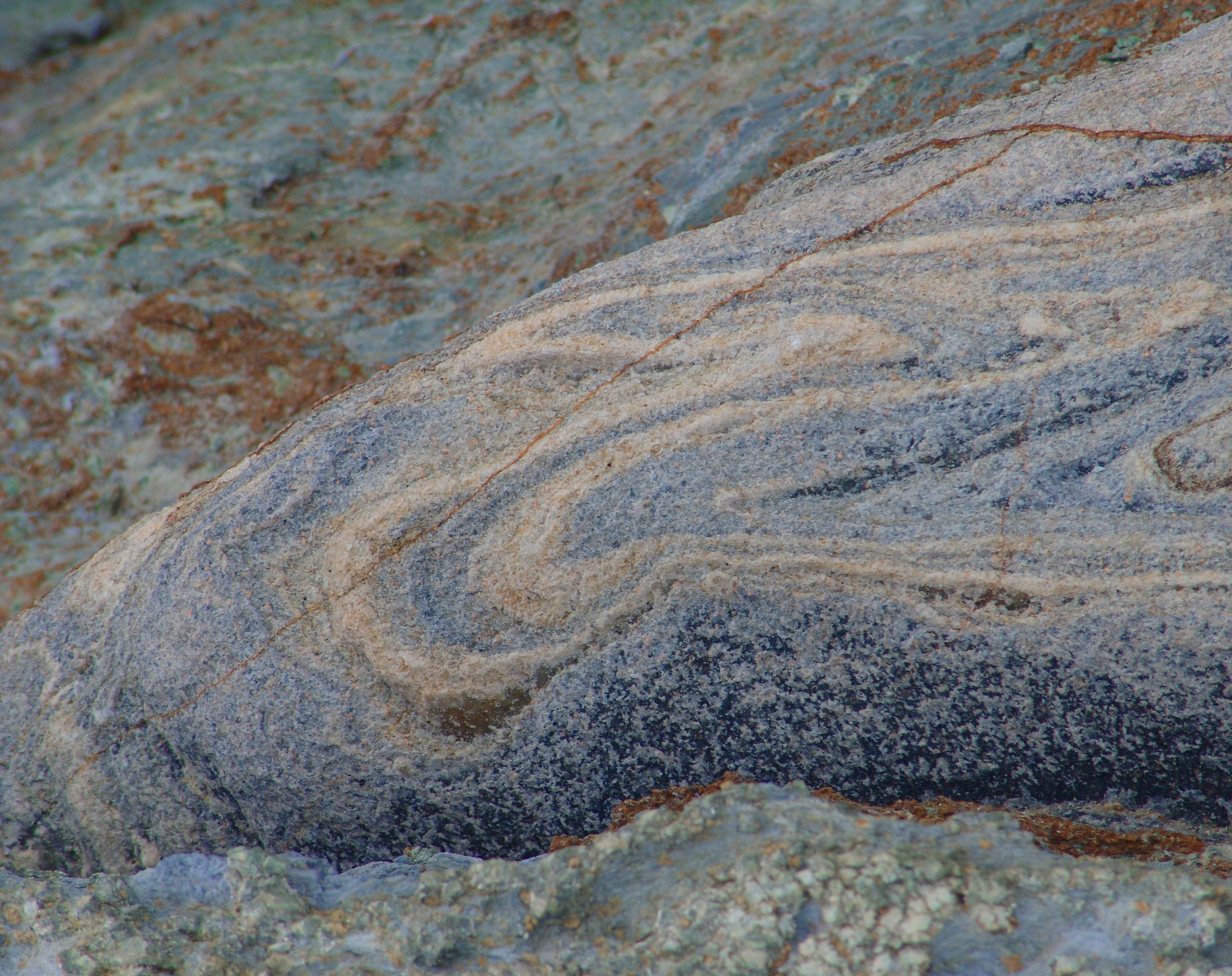
Folded Glaucophane Blueschist, Syros, Greece

There is also a rare amphibole called holmquistite, chemical formula Li_{2}Mg_{3}Al_{2}Si_{8}O_{22}(OH)_{2}, which occurs only in lithium-rich continental rocks. For many years, holmquistite was mistaken for glaucophane, as the two look identical in thin section.

== See also ==
- List of minerals
