= Phengite =

Phyllosilicate mineral in the dioctahedral mica group

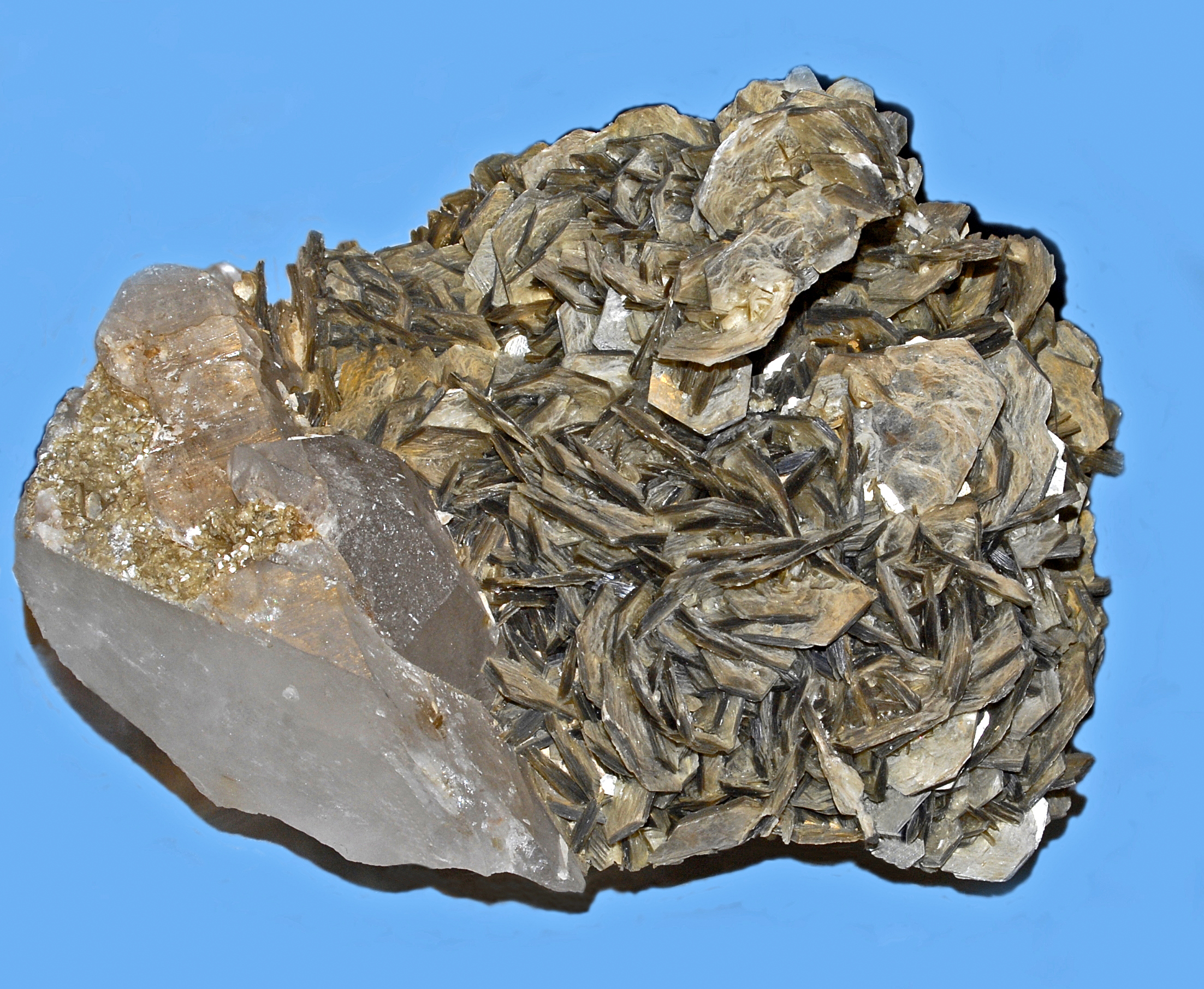

General
- Category: Phyllosilicate minerals
- Group: Mica group, dioctahedral mica group
- Formula: K(AlMg)_{2}(OH)_{2}(SiAl)_{4}O_{10}
- IMA status: Variety of muscovite

Phengite is a series name for dioctahedral micas of composition K(Al,Mg)_{2}(OH)_{2}(Si,Al)_{4}O_{10}. It is common for Mg or Fe^{2+} to substitute for Al on the Y site and a corresponding increase in Si on the Z site in the mica group formula X_{2}Y_{4–6}Z_{8}O_{20}(OH, F)_{4}. It is similar to muscovite but with addition of magnesium. It is a non-IMA recognized mineral name representing the series between muscovite and celadonite.

The silica content of phengite has been proposed as a geobarometer for the metamorphism of low grade schists.
