= Clinopyroxene thermobarometry =

Compositional diagram of pyroxenes. Diopside, hedenbergite and augite are main sub-minerals of clinopyroxene. Jadeite contains aluminium and is therefore not shown in the diagram.

Clinopyroxene thermobarometry is a scientific method that uses the mineral clinopyroxene to determine the temperature and pressure of the magma when the mineral crystalized. Clinopyroxene is found in many igneous rocks, so the method can be used to determine information about the entire rock. Many different minerals can be used for geothermobarometry, but clinopyroxene is especially useful because it's a common phenocryst in igneous rocks and easy to identify, and the crystallization of jadeite, a type of clinopyroxene, implies a growth in molar volume, making it a good indicator of pressure.

The data given by this technique is used for understanding magmatic crystallization, prograde and retrograde metamorphism, and ore deposit formation. Understanding these processes can aid industries as well as the scientific community. With this data, information about the lithosphere composition can be extrapolated in more detail, and the diamond exploration industry can determine the probability that a kimberlite contains diamonds.

== Methods ==
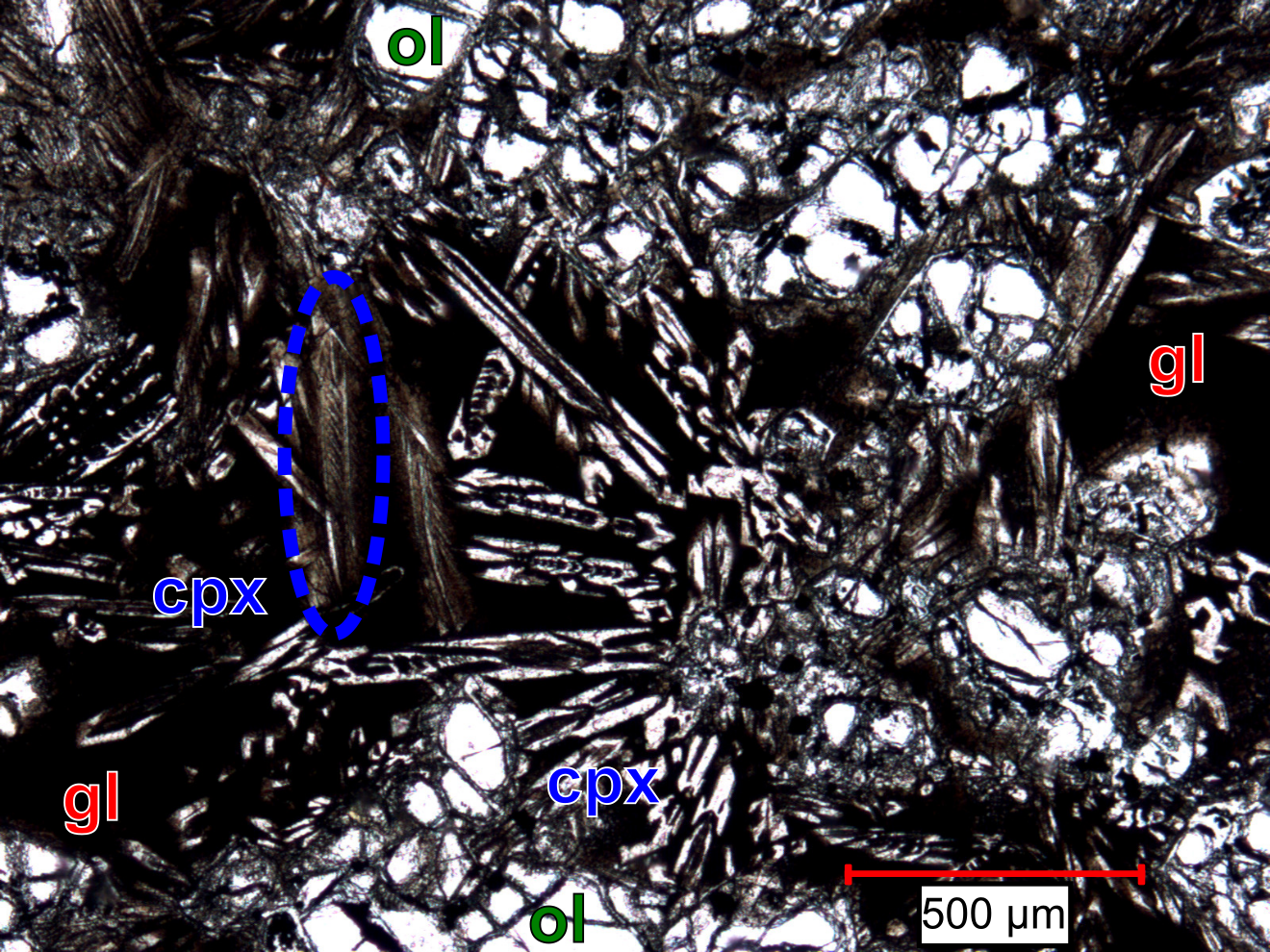
Magnified image of komatilites that have clinopyroxene crystals within. The crystals could be used for thermobarometry of the komatilite mineral. Cpx represents clinopyroxene, ol represents olivine, and gl represents glass.

Thermobarometry uses equilibrium constants to calculate information about the environmental conditions present during the rocks' formation. While each rock is forming, it reacts with the surrounding elements until it cools down enough to become inert. Each mineral within the rock will cool and crystalize at different points; a petrogenetic grid is a useful way to visualize each mineral crystalizing in sequence.

Individual reactions of specific minerals can be used to calculate either the temperature or pressure. Therefore, two different reactions are needed to calculate both the temperature and pressure of the magma for a single rock. Some reactions are better for pressure and others are better for temperature, based on thermodynamics and Le Chatelier's Principle.

This technique requires each reaction to be calibrated, which is done through experimentation and data analysis. Experimentation involves simulating the temperatures and pressures at which these rocks form and observing how the reaction proceeds at those conditions, while data analysis relies on amassing a large database of rock samples with pressure and temperature information. Experimental data tends to have significant variation, so using data from natural formations is more accurate, if it's available.

=== Pressure ===
This image shows an experiment that determines the calibration curve of the change in volume of diopside at different pressures. The equilibrium constant for this reaction can be calculated based on the data.

The reactions best for pressure (geobarometers) are ones that have a large change in molar volume during the reaction. Higher pressures cause the reaction to decrease in total volume, and lighter pressures allow reaction to increase in total volume. Therefore, based on the proportion of minerals that have larger volumes versus the proportion of minerals that have smaller volumes, the pressure of the environment during the reaction can be calculated, as a function of temperature. Experiments must be done to calibrate each reaction and determine the rate at which the volume changes with changes in pressure.

=== Temperature ===
The reactions best for temperature (geothermometers) are ones that have a large enthalpy of reaction, which means they release or consume a lot of heat. Higher temperatures allow the reaction to consume that heat while lower temperatures cause the reaction to release heat. Similarly to geobarometers, the proportion of minerals that are formed by releasing heat versus consuming heat can be used to calculate the temperature, as long as the reaction is calibrated.

=== Reaction Types ===
There are three types of reactions that clinopyroxene is involved in and can be used for thermobarometry.

Univariant reactions or displaced equilibria reactions either create or destroy phases within the magma. Each phase will eventually crystalize as a unique mineral. Based on the temperature and pressure conditions, different proportions of these phases will emerge in the final rock. An example reaction is jadeite and quartz reacting to make analbite. Jadeite is a type of pyroxene, so this reaction is used for clinopyroxene barometry.

$\ce{NaAlS2O6 + SiO2 -> NaAlS3O8}$

This particular reaction involves a large change in volume between the reactants and the products, so the reaction is very sensitive to pressure changes.

Exchange Reactions occur when there are minerals with similar structures, and ions switch places with each other within that structure. This is a common method to calculate the temperature because most exchange reactions have a high enthalpy. One example reaction is an exchange of Fe^{2+} and Mg^{2+} within garnet and clinopyroxene. That causes pyrope and hedenbergite (pyroxene) to change into almandine and diopside (pyroxene).

$\ce{Mg3Al2Si3O12 + 3CaFeSi2O6 -> Fe3Al2Si3O12 + 3CaMgSi2O6}$

Solvus Equilibria reactions occur when two phases dissolve into each other based on the temperature, so it is usually useful for geothermometry. One such reaction is when clinopyroxene and orthopyroxene dissolve into each other. This changes the distribution of calcium and magnesium throughout the mineral.

== Applications ==
Clinopyroxene thermobarometry is usually used by mining industries. It is particularly helpful to the diamond industry, so many stakeholders possess pressure and temperature data regarding the formation of rocks that contain diamonds. This is important because diamonds are usually found in kimberlites, but kimberlites do not always contain diamonds. Instead of mining every kimberlite found, they can be sampled to see if they formed in an environment that would have favored the crystallization of diamonds.

Other applications are largely scientific; pressure and temperature data about magma can be used to propose detailed models of the lithosphere and mantle. These models enhance understanding of geological and volcanic activity, which may contribute to scientists' ability to predict events such as eruptions or earthquakes.
