= Pigeonite =

Pyroxene mineral

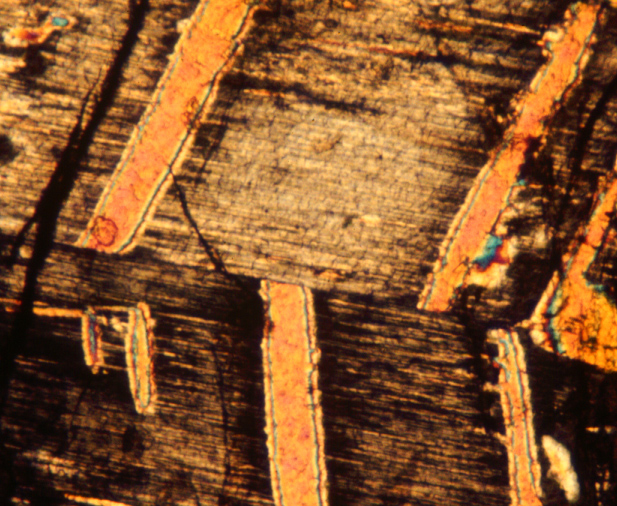
- Polarized light microscope image of part of a grain of orthopyroxene containing exsolution lamellae of augite The texture documents a multistage history: (1) crystallization of twinned pigeonite, followed by exsolution of augite; (2) breakdown of pigeonite to orthopyroxene plus augite; (3) exsolution of augite parallel to the former twin plane of pigeonite. (long dimension 0.5 mm, Bushveld igneous complex)

General
- Category: Inosilicate minerals (single chain)
- Group: Pyroxene group, clinopyroxene subgroup
- Formula: (Ca,Mg,Fe)(Mg,Fe)Si_{2}O_{6}
- IMA symbol: Pgt
- Strunz classification: 9.DA.10
- Dana classification: 65.01.01.04
- Crystal system: Monoclinic
- Crystal class: Prismatic (2/m) (same H-M symbol)
- Space group: P2_{1}/c
- Unit cell: a = 9.7, b = 8.95, c = 5.24 [Å]; β = 108.59°; Z = 4

Identification
- Color: Brown, greenish brown-black
- Crystal habit: Prismatic crystals, to 1 cm; granular, massive.
- Twinning: Commonly twinned simply or multiply on {100} or {001}
- Cleavage: Good on {110}, (110) ^ (11̅0) ~87°
- Fracture: Conchoidal
- Tenacity: Brittle
- Mohs scale hardness: 6
- Luster: Vitreous to dull
- Streak: Grey white
- Diaphaneity: Semitransparent
- Specific gravity: 3.17 – 3.46 measured
- Optical properties: Biaxial (+)
- Refractive index: n_{α} = 1.683 – 1.722 n_{β} = 1.684 - 1.722 n_{γ} = 1.704 – 1.752
- Birefringence: δ = 0.021 – 0.030
- Pleochroism: Weak to moderate; X = colorless, pale green, brown; Y = pale brown, pale brownish green, brownish pink; Z = colorless, pale green, pale yellow
- 2V angle: 0 – 30° measured
- Dispersion: weak to distinct

Pigeonite is a mineral in the clinopyroxene subgroup of the pyroxene group. It has a general formula of (Ca,Mg,Fe)(Mg,Fe)Si_{2}O_{6}. The calcium cation fraction can vary from 5% to 25%, with iron and magnesium making up the rest of the cations.

Pigeonite crystallizes in the monoclinic system, as does augite, and a miscibility gap exists between the two minerals. At lower temperatures, pigeonite is unstable relative to augite plus orthopyroxene. The low-temperature limit of pigeonite stability depends upon the Fe/Mg ratio in the mineral and is hotter for more Mg-rich compositions; for a Fe/Mg ratio of about 1, the temperature is about 900 °C. The presence of pigeonite in an igneous rock thus provides evidence for the crystallization temperature of the magma, and hence indirectly for the water content of that magma.

Pigeonite is found as phenocrysts in volcanic rocks on Earth and as crystals in meteorites from Mars and the Moon. In slowly cooled intrusive igneous rocks, pigeonite is rarely preserved. Slow cooling gives the calcium the necessary time to separate itself from the structure to form exsolution lamellae of calcic clinopyroxene, leaving no pigeonite present. Textural evidence of its breakdown to orthopyroxene plus augite may be present, as shown in the accompanying microscopic image.

Pigeonite is named for its type locality on Lake Superior's shores at Pigeon Point, Minnesota, United States. It was first described in 1900.
