= Jadeite =

Pyroxene mineral

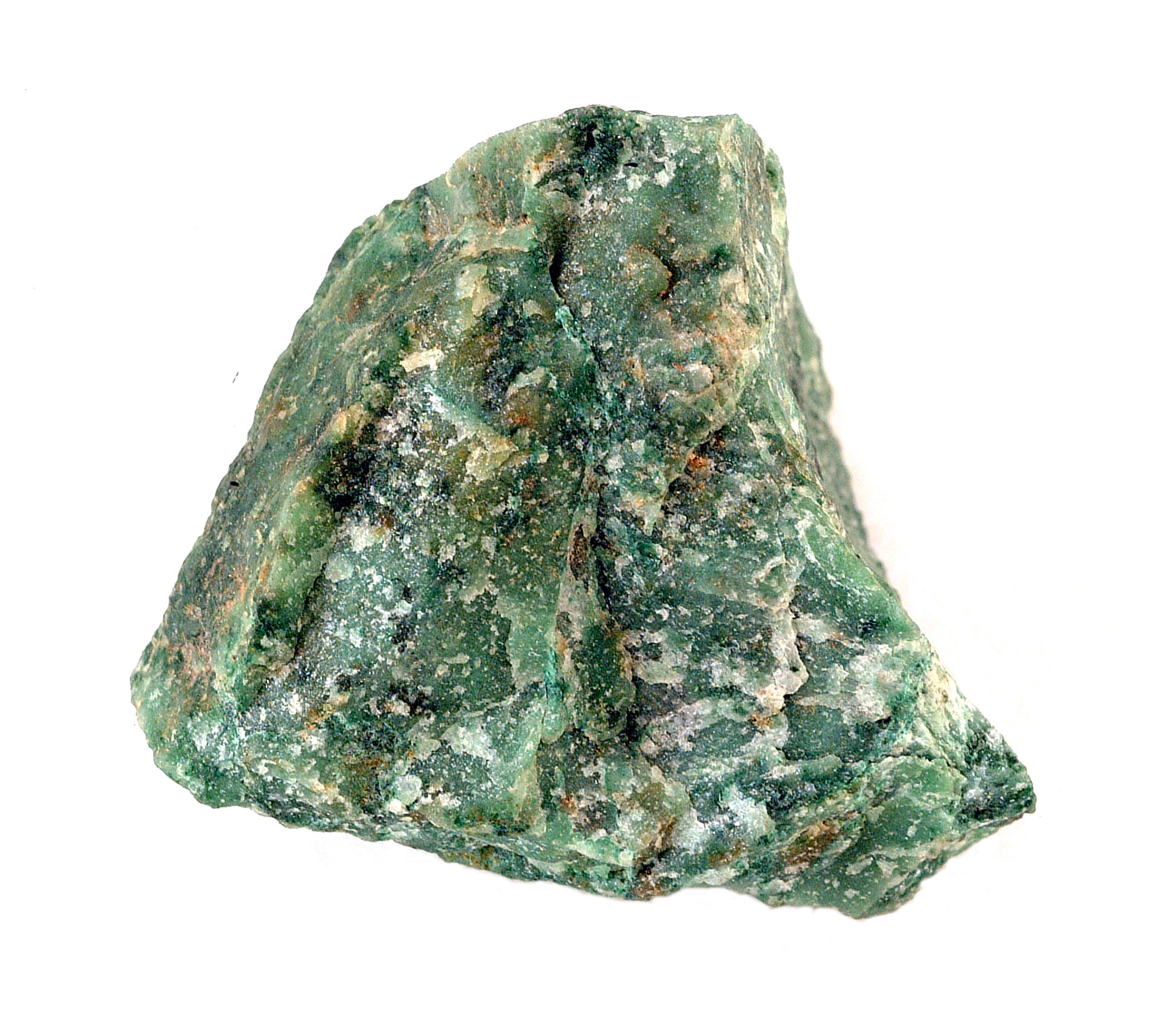
- Jadeite from California

General
- Category: Inosilicate minerals (single chain)
- Group: Pyroxene group, clinopyroxene subgroup
- Formula: NaAlSi_{2}O_{6} or Na(Al,Fe^{3+})Si_{2}O_{6}
- IMA symbol: Jd
- Strunz classification: 9.DA.25
- Crystal system: Monoclinic
- Crystal class: Prismatic (2/m) (same H-M symbol)
- Space group: C2/c

Identification
- Color: Apple-green, emerald-green, bluish green, leek-green, purplish blue, greenish white, white, black, may show green spots, rarely blue or violet; colorless in thin section. Often also banded.
- Crystal habit: Commonly massive, or fibrous, granular; prismatic crystals rare
- Twinning: Single and lamellar twinning on [100] and [001]
- Cleavage: Good on [110]
- Fracture: Splintery
- Mohs scale hardness: 6.5–7
- Luster: Subvitreous, pearly on cleavages
- Streak: White
- Diaphaneity: Translucent
- Specific gravity: 3.24 to 3.43
- Polish luster: vitreous to greasy
- Optical properties: Biaxial (+)
- Refractive index: nα = 1.654 – 1.673 nβ = 1.659 – 1.679 nγ = 1.667 – 1.693
- Birefringence: δ = 0.013 – 0.020
- Dispersion: r > v; moderate to strong.
- Ultraviolet fluorescence: Dark colors are generally inert. Light green – inert to weak white in long wave, generally inert in short wave; light yellow – inert to weak green in long wave, generally inert in short wave; white – inert to weak in long wave, generally inert in short wave; light purple – inert to weak white or weak brownish red in long wave, generally inert in short wave; some dyed lavender colors – moderate to strong orange in long wave, weaker in short wave

Jadeite is a pyroxene mineral with composition NaAlSi_{2}O_{6}. It is hard (Mohs hardness of about 6.5 to 7.0), very tough, and dense, with a specific gravity of about 3.4. It is found in a wide range of colors, but is most often found in shades of green or white. Jadeite is formed only in the subduction zones of continental margins, where rock undergoes metamorphism at high pressure but relatively low temperature.

Jadeite is the principal mineral making up the most valuable form of jade, a precious stone particularly prized in China. Most gem-quality jadeite jade comes from northern Myanmar. Jade tools and implements have been found at Stone Age sites, showing that the mineral has been prized by humans since before the beginning of written history.

== Name ==
The name jadeite is derived (via French: jade and Latin: ilia) from the Spanish phrase "piedra de ijada" which means "stone of the side". The Latin version of the name, lapis nephriticus, is the origin of the term nephrite, which is a different mineral that also shares the common name jade.

== Properties ==
Jadeite is a hard, extremely tough, rare mineral of the clinopyroxene family of minerals. Though highly variable in color, it is typically apple-green to emerald-green, or less commonly white or white with spots of green. Occurrences are typically granular or massive; individual crystals are very rare, occurring only as small prismatic crystals in vugs in massive jadeite. Crystals are four-sided or eight-sided in cross section and show perfect cleavage on [110] at angles of 87 and 93 degrees. There is also a rare parting on [100]. The interlocking crystals of massive jadeite help give it its extreme toughness.

Jadeite has a Mohs hardness of 6.5 to 7, slightly less than that of common quartz. Fracture surfaces are sugary in texture, and sparkle from the exposed perfect cleavage on [110]. Jade is relatively dense, with a specific gravity of 3.3 to 3.5 in natural specimens. The specific gravity increases with the iron content, and very pure jadeite has a specific gravity of 3.25. The luster is vitreous, or pearly on exposed cleavage surfaces, and the streak is colorless. Jadeite is translucent to transparent.

Jadeite is characterized by its green color and tough aggregates of compact fibrous crystals. It can be distinguished from nephrite by its vitreous luster on polished surfaces (polished nephrite has an oily luster) and by its higher density and refractive index. Serpentine also has a lower density and refractive index than jadeite. Massive jadeite also characteristically shows a more granular texture than nephrite or serpentinite.

Jadeite has a fusibility of 2.5 (making it moderately easy to fuse with a propane flame) and gives a yellow flame color.

Pure jadeite has the composition NaAlSi_{2}O_{6} and has the typical clinopyroxene structure. This consists of long chains of silica tetrahedra in which each silicon ion is surrounded by four oxygen ions, with two of the oxygen ions shared with neighboring silica tetraheda. The chains are bonded together by aluminium and sodium ions to form the full three-dimensional structure of a jadeite crystal. The aluminium joins pairs of chains (occupying the so-called M1 site) while sodium joins the paired chains to neighboring paired chains (occupying the so-called M2 site). The resulting crystal structure belongs to the monoclinic system, with space group C2/c.

== Chemistry and origin ==
Pure jadeite has the composition NaAlSi_{2}O_{6}. There is no significant replacement of silicon by aluminium in natural jadeite, and only very limited substitution of ferric iron for aluminium. However, calcium substitutes for up to 20% of the sodium, balanced by substitution of magnesium or ferrous iron for aluminium.

Omphacite is intermediate in composition between jadeite and diopside. However, there is not a true solid solution series, as omphacite has its own structure that is slightly different from either pure jadeite or pure diopside, so that it is separated from either end member by a miscibility gap. Chloromelanite is a dark green variety of jadeite in which some aluminium is replaced by iron, while imperial jade, the most valuable variety of jade, is colored an intense emerald green by traces of chromium.

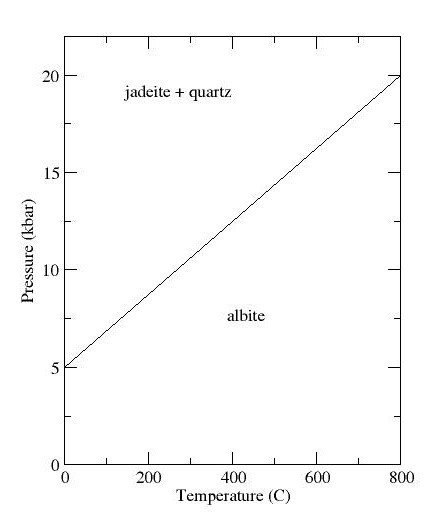
Phase diagram for jadeite system

Jadeite occurs with albite in metamorphic rock of the low-temperature, high-pressure blueschist facies at destructive plate margins. Although it is intermediate in silica content between albite and nepheline, it is not stable under the conditions in which these two minerals are present. Formation of jadeite requires a pressure of 10 to 25 kbar and a temperature of 600 to 1,000 °C (1,100 to 1,800 °F) via the reaction:

+ →	Reaction 1

Jadeite can also form at high pressure via the reaction:

→ +	Reaction 2

At still higher pressure, corresponding to the highest blueschist facies, jadeite reacts with lawsonite to form zoisite and paragonite:

+ → + + +	Reaction 3

Minerals associated with jadeite include: glaucophane, lawsonite, muscovite, aragonite, serpentine and quartz.

Rocks that consist almost entirely of jadeite are called jadeitite. In all well-documented occurrences, jadeitite appears to have formed from subduction zone fluids in association with serpentinite.

Jadeitite is resistant to weathering, and alluvial boulders of jadeitite released from the serpentine-rich environments in which they formed can have weights of up to tons. Raw specimens having Burmese tax stamps or polished slots for evaluating quality are prized by some collectors.

== Colors ==
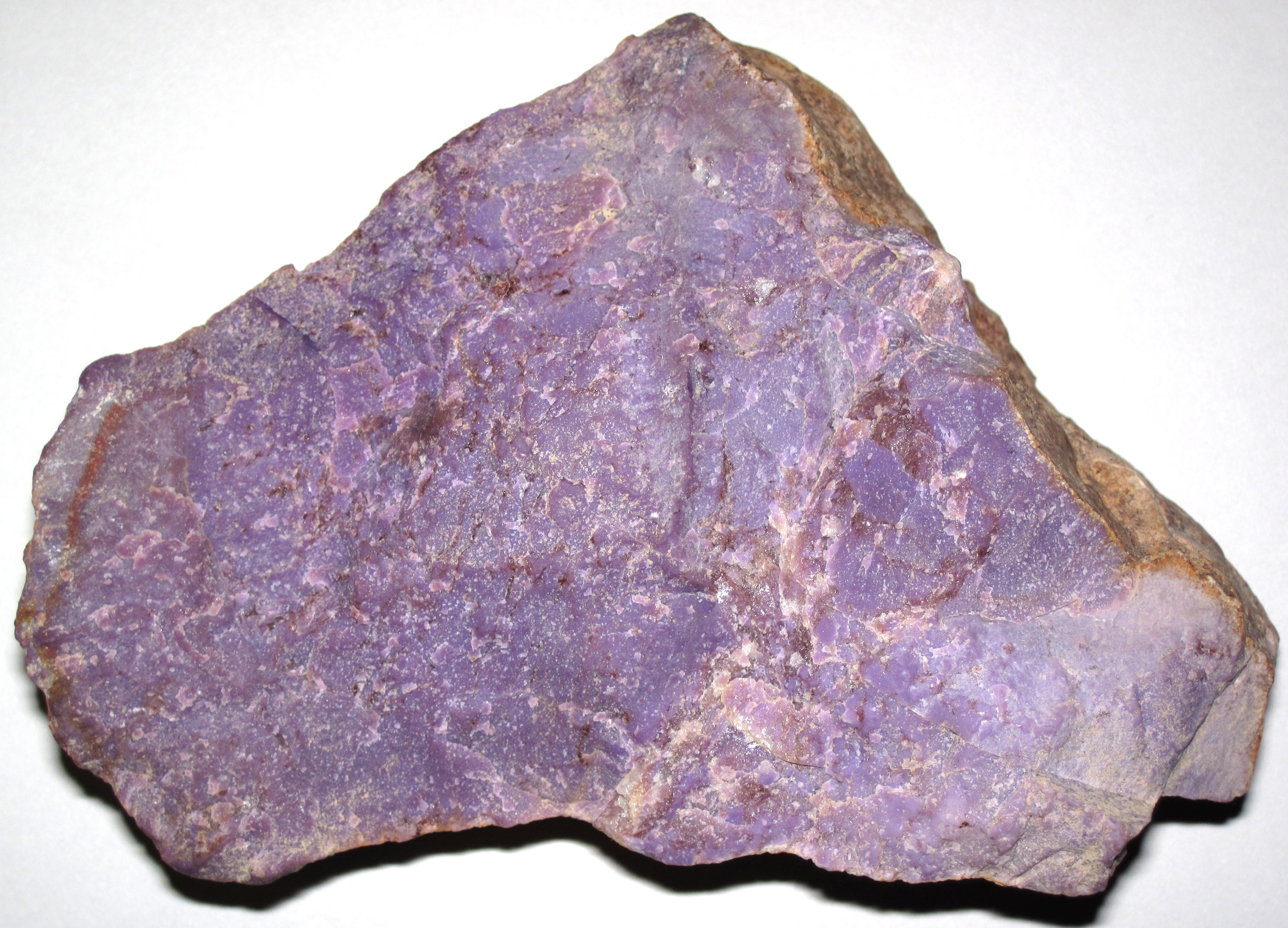
Unusual lavender jade (metaphonolite) from Bursa Province, northwestern Turkey. The color is from jadeite pyroxene.

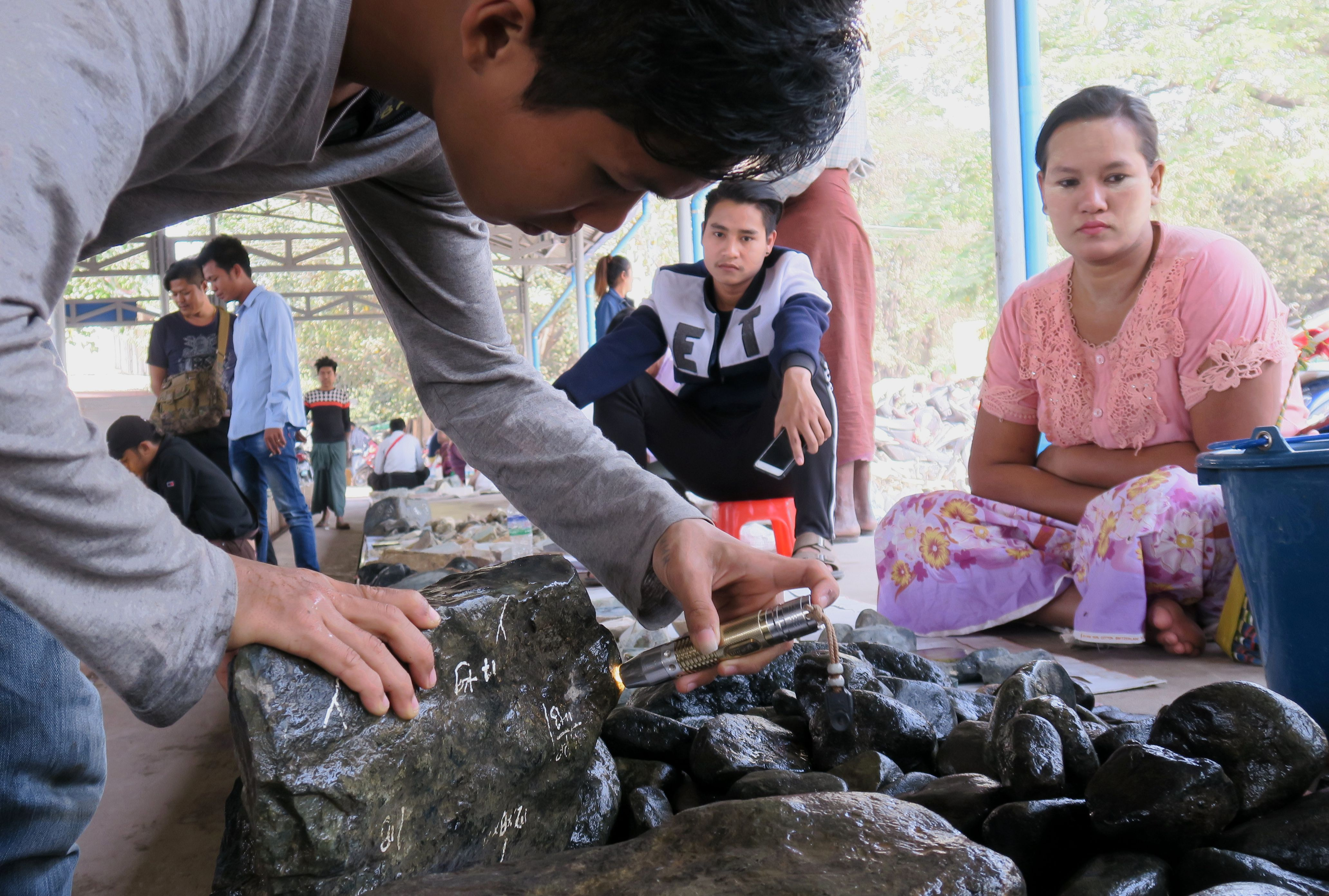
Jade rock inspection with a portable UV LED flashlight in Mandalay Jade Market.

Jadeite's color commonly ranges from white through pale apple green to deep jade green but can also be blue-green (like the recently rediscovered "Olmec Blue" jade), pink, lavender and a multitude of other rare colors. Chloromelanite is a very dark green to black variety. Color is largely affected by the presence of trace elements such as chromium and iron. Its translucence varies from opaque to almost clear. Variations in color and translucence are often found even within a single specimen.

== Occurrence ==
Significant occurrences of jadeite are isolated and rare. It is found exclusively in high-pressure, low-temperature metamorphic rock of continental margins. Here it may be found as pods or veins or as disseminated grains. Deposits are found in Myanmar, the Alps, Russia, California, Japan, and Guatemala. In the Franciscan Complex of California, jadeite is associated with glaucophane, aragonite, muscovite, lawsonite, and quartz. However, occurrences of lapidary quality are almost exclusive to Myanmar. Stream boulders of the Uyu River remain an important source of jadeite.

== Synthesis ==
Experimental synthesis of jadeite began in the early 1950s. L. Coen at Norton Abrasives is cited as possibly producing the first synthetic jadeite in 1953.

In the 1980s, General Electric and other research groups produced synthetic jadeite in controlled settings for materials science and petrological research. However, despite such experimentation, commercial-scale production has not occurred due to the difficulty and costs associated with synthetic production. The pressure and temperature requirements are expensive and, as such, mining remains cheaper.

Since the late 20th century, natural jadeite has sometimes been treated using a process called "bleaching", followed by polymer impregnation, to improve color or translucency. Such treatments, however, differ from true synthesis and are detectable through standard gemological testing.

== Uses ==
Jadeite is the dominant mineral of the most desirable variety of jade. This is commonly used in traditional Chinese culture, where it is worked into many different ornaments and utensils.

Jadeite was also used by Stone Age peoples for implements and weapons.

Jade received its name, "piedra de ijada" ("stone of the side"), because it was once thought to cure kidney ailments when applied to the side of the body.

=== Jade ===
Jadeite is one of two minerals recognized as the gemstone jade. The other is nephrite. Occasionally, other minerals such as serpentine or quartz are sold as jade, but the difference can be determined by cleavage and hardness. Jadeite jade is the most valuable form, with the highest-quality material commanding prices well in excess of $200 per carat as of 1994. Jadeite jade first came into significant use in China only towards the end of the 18th century, as fei tsui.

Jadeite from the Motagua Valley, Guatemala, was used by the Olmec and Maya peoples, as well as the indigenous peoples of Costa Rica.

Unusual colors, like "Olmec blue" jade, which is characterized by its deep blue-green, translucent hue with white flecking, are becoming more highly valued because of its unique beauty and historical use by the Mesoamerican Olmec and also in Costa Rica.

=== Stone Age use ===
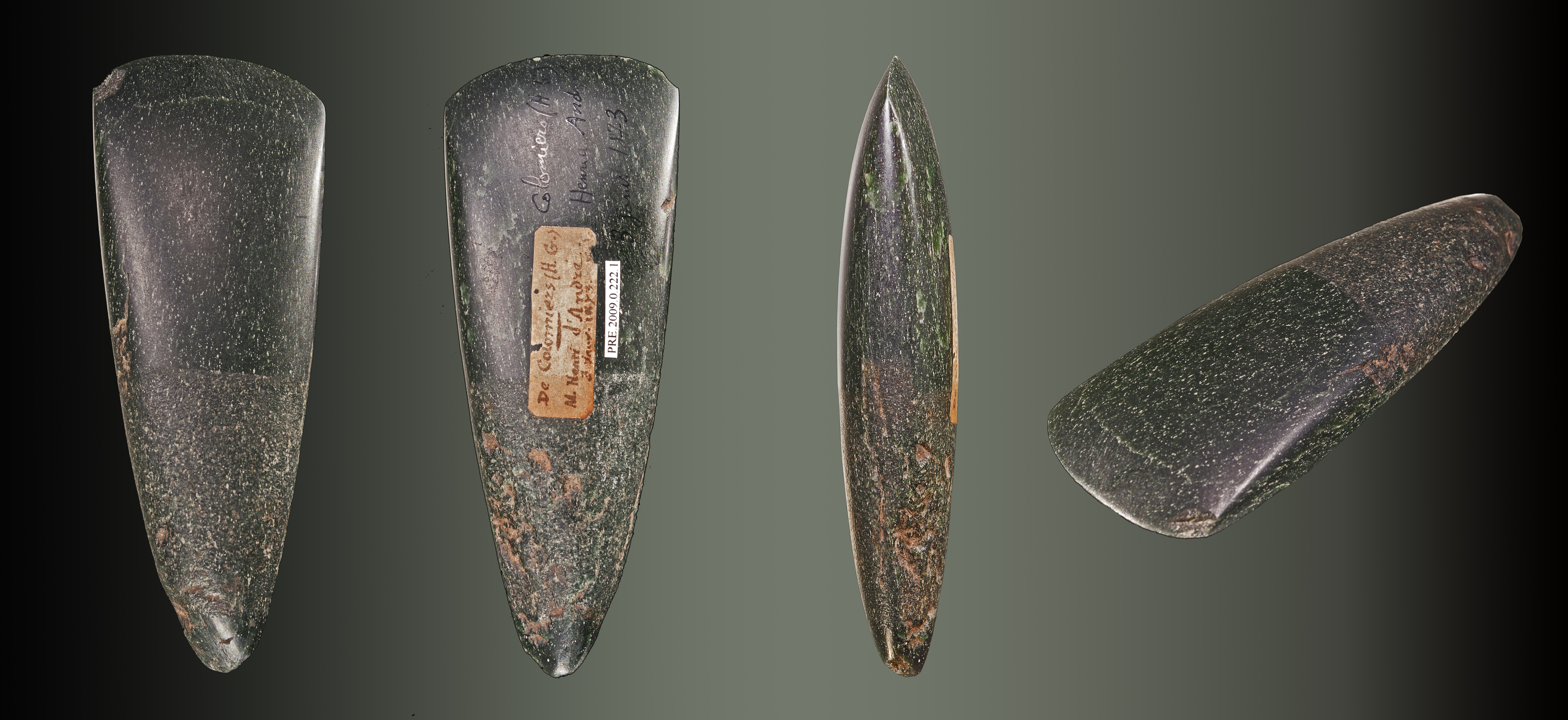
Polished Neolithic jadeitite axe-head from the Museum of Toulouse

Over 180 axe heads made from jadeitite quarried in northern Italy in the Neolithic era have been found across the British Isles. Because of the difficulty of working this material, all the axe heads of this type found are thought to have been non-utilitarian and to have represented some form of currency or be the products of gift exchange.

A great many jadeite beads and axe heads as well as the remains of jadeite workshops from the Neolithic era have been uncovered in Itoigawa, Japan. These beads and axes were traded throughout Japan and the Korean Peninsula and were produced by the world's oldest known jadeite-using culture, centered on the Itoigawa region.

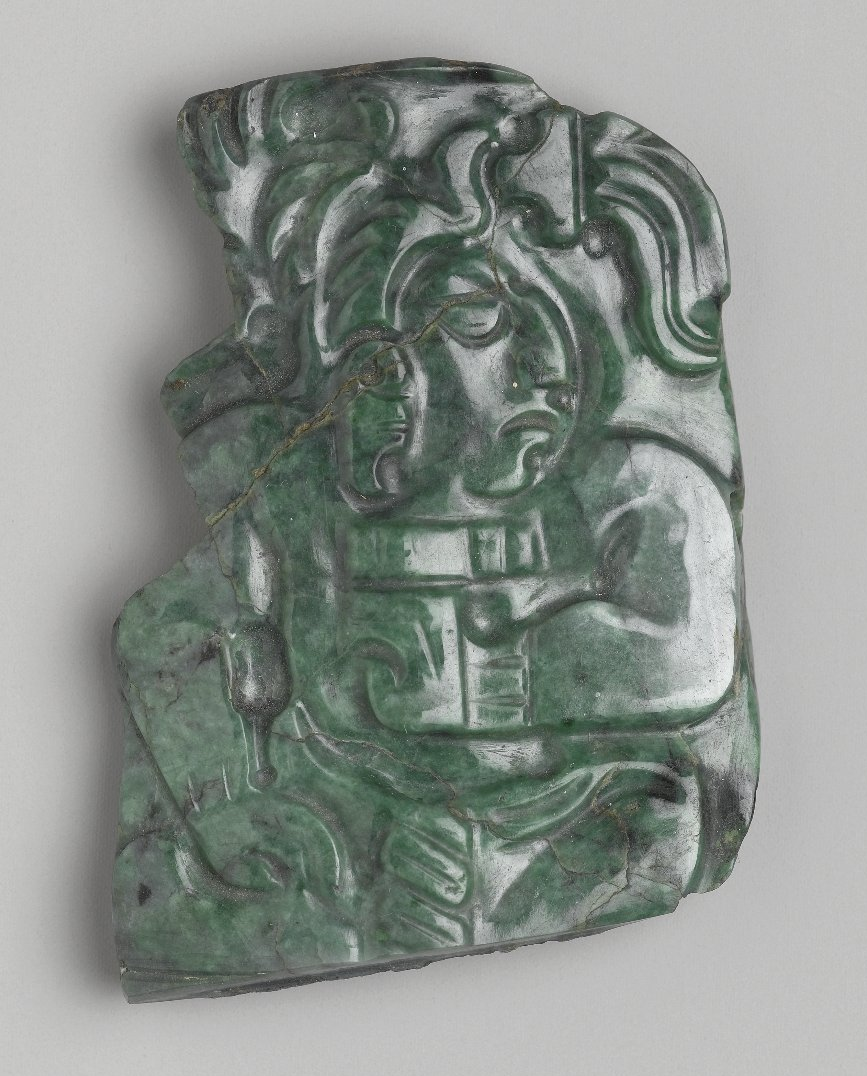
Maya Jadeite Plaque, 600–900 AD, Brooklyn Museum

== See also ==
- Clinopyroxene thermobarometry
- Costa Rican jade tradition
- Jade use in Mesoamerica
- List of minerals

== Sources ==
- Yardley, Bruce W. D. (1989). An Introduction to Metamorphic Petrology. Longman Earth Science Series. Harlow, Essex, England: Longman Scientific & Technical. ISBN 0-582-30096-7.
