= Pigeon Bay (disambiguation) =

Pigeon Bay lies between Ontario, Canada and Minnesota, United States.

Pigeon Bay may also refer to:

- Pigeon Bay, New Zealand, a settlement on Banks Peninsula, New Zealand
- Pigeon Bay, a bay near the southwestern of the Liaodong Peninsula, Manchuria, China, the scene of naval operations during the Russo-Japanese War (1904–1905)

== See also ==
- Pigeon Hill Bay, a bay in Maine, United States
