= Pigeon Point =

Pigeon Point may refer to:

- Pigeon Point Lighthouse, California
- Pigeon Point, Minnesota
- Pigeon Point, Tobago
- The Pigeon Point neighborhood in Beaufort, South Carolina
- The Pigeon Point neighborhood in Delridge, Seattle
