= Ridinger =

Ridinger is a surname. Notable people with the surname include:

- Johann Elias Ridinger (1698–1767), German painter, engraver, draughtsman, and publisher
- Mary Lou Ridinger (born 1945), American archaeologist
- Tim Ridinger (born 1956), American politician

== See also ==
- Ruel Redinger (1896–1969), American gridiron football player
