= Augite =

Common rock-forming pyroxene mineral

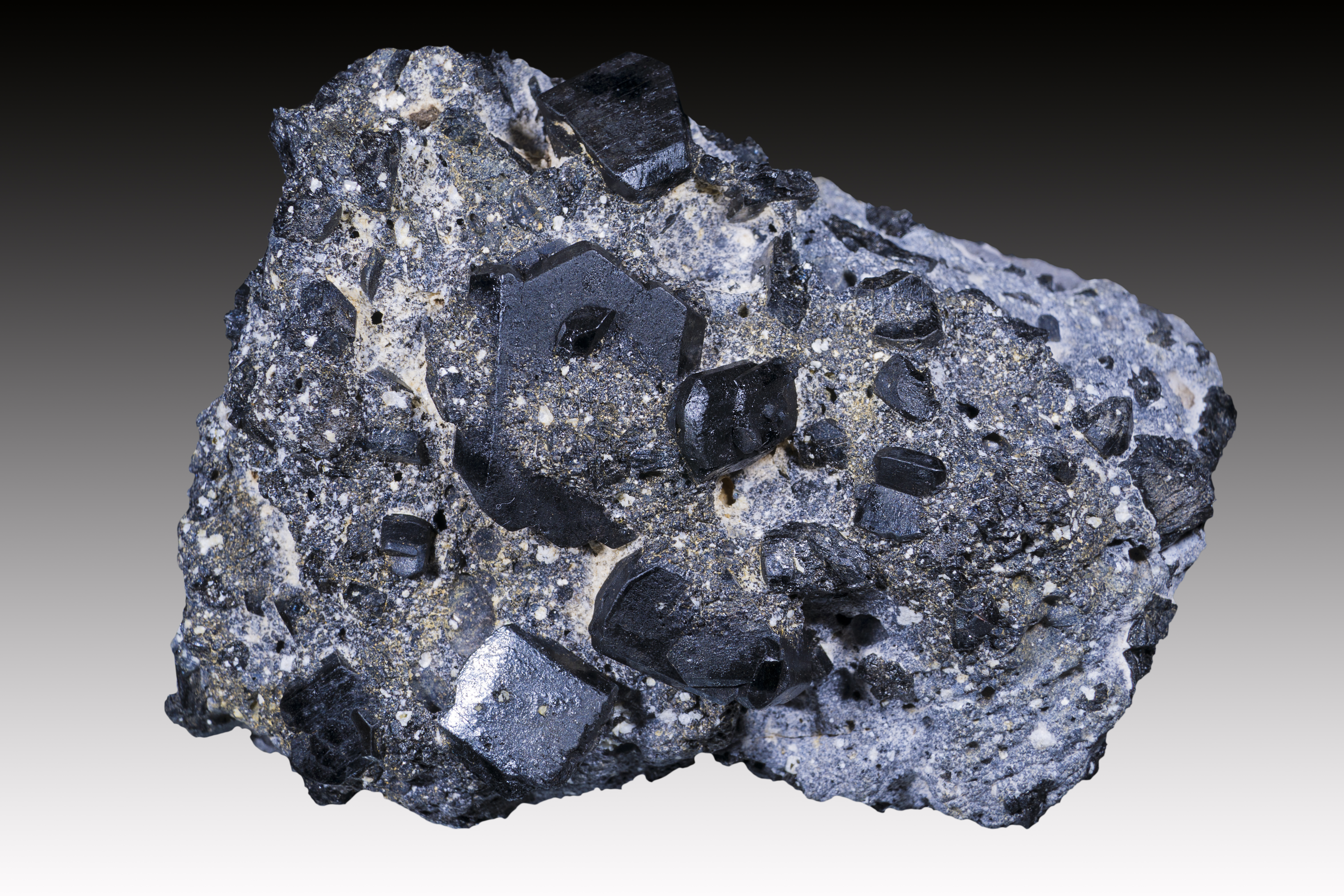
- Augite – Muhavura volcano

General
- Category: Inosilicate minerals (single chain)
- Group: Pyroxene group, clinopyroxene subgroup
- Formula: (Ca,Na)(Mg,Fe,Al,Ti)(Si,Al)_{2}O_{6}
- IMA symbol: Aug
- Strunz classification: 9.DA.15
- Crystal system: Monoclinic
- Crystal class: Prismatic (2/m) (same H-M symbol)
- Space group: C2/c
- Unit cell: a = 9.699, b = 8.844 c = 5.272 [Å] β = 106.97°; Z = 4

Identification
- Color: Black, brown, greenish, violet-brown; in thin section, colorless to gray with zoning common
- Crystal habit: Commonly as stubby prismatic crystals, also acicular, skeletal, dendritic
- Twinning: Simple or multiple on {100} and {001}
- Cleavage: {110} good with 87° between {110} and {11̅0}; parting on {100} and {010}
- Fracture: uneven to conchoidal
- Tenacity: brittle
- Mohs scale hardness: 5.5 to 6
- Luster: Vitreous, resinous to dull
- Streak: Greenish-white
- Diaphaneity: Transparent to opaque
- Specific gravity: 3.19–3.56
- Optical properties: Biaxial (+)
- Refractive index: n_{α} = 1.680–1.735, n_{β} = 1.684–1.741, n_{γ} = 1.706–1.774
- Birefringence: δ = 0.026–0.039
- Pleochroism: X = pale green, pale brown, green, greenish yellow; Y = pale brown, pale yellow-green, violet; Z = pale green, grayish green, violet

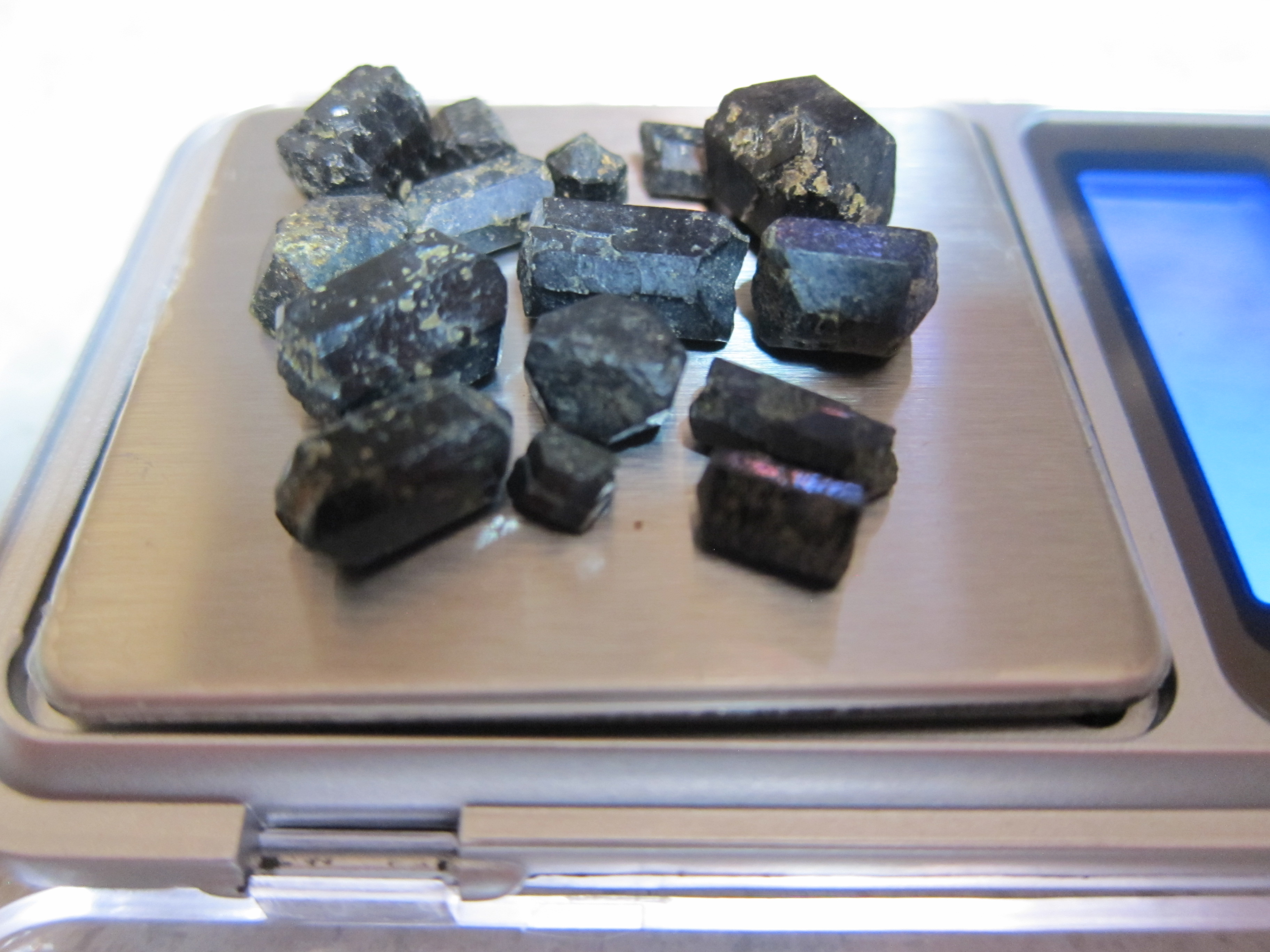
Augite, tillamook

Augite, also known as Augurite, is a common rock-forming pyroxene mineral with formula (Ca,Na)(Mg,Fe,Al,Ti)(Si,Al)_{2}O_{6}. The crystals are monoclinic and prismatic. Augite has two prominent cleavages, meeting at angles near 90 degrees.

== Characteristics ==
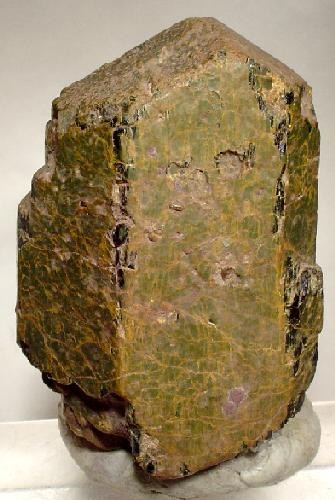
Euhedral crystal of augite from Teide (4.4 x 3.0 x 2.3 cm)

Augite is a solid solution in the pyroxene group. Diopside and hedenbergite are important endmembers in augite, but augite can also contain significant aluminium, titanium, and sodium and other elements. The calcium content of augite is limited by a miscibility gap between it and pigeonite and orthopyroxene: when occurring with either of these other pyroxenes, the calcium content of augite is a function of temperature and pressure, but mostly of temperature, and so can be useful in reconstructing temperature histories of rocks. With declining temperature, augite may exsolve lamellae of pigeonite and/or orthopyroxene. There is also a miscibility gap between augite and omphacite, but this gap occurs at higher temperatures. There are no industrial or economic uses for this mineral.

== Locations ==
Augite is an essential mineral in mafic igneous rocks; for example, gabbro and basalt and common in ultramafic rocks. It also occurs in relatively high-temperature metamorphic rocks such as mafic granulite and metamorphosed iron formations. It commonly occurs in association with orthoclase, sanidine, labradorite, olivine, leucite, amphiboles and other pyroxenes.

On the west coast of the United States, Tillamook, Oregon has an Augite formation in an ash tuff inclusion high up in the Tillamook Forest near the Cedar Butte trailhead. The area yields notable examples of Augite crystal specimens both large and small which display a dark black shiny luster and clean monoclinic facets. They can found on the ground and also embedded in clusters of broken ash tuff pieces that have eroded and fallen from the sloped cliff above the trail.

Occasional specimens have a shiny appearance that give rise to the mineral's name, which is from the Greek augites, meaning "brightness", although ordinary specimens have a dull (dark green, brown or black) luster. It was named by Abraham Gottlob Werner in 1792.

== See also ==
- Fassaite
