= Pigeon Point, Minnesota =

Peninsula

Pigeon Point
- Location within Minnesota

Geography
- Location: Lake Superior, Pigeon Bay
- Coordinates: 47°58′25.39″N 89°34′47.22″W

Administration
- United States
- State: Minnesota
- County: Cook County
- Townships: Grand Portage

Demographics
- Population: Uninhabited (2000)

Pigeon Point is an isolated peninsula located at the northeast extremity of Minnesota, in Cook County, Minnesota, United States. To the north of the point lies Pigeon Bay, which shares a shoreline with Canada, and to the south is Lake Superior. Pigeon Point is the closest mainland U.S. point to Isle Royale, on the far side of the water boundary between Minnesota and Michigan. The extreme end of the point is owned by the United States Coast Guard while the land up to the point is held by the Grand Portage Indian Reservation. The settlement closest to the point is Grand Portage, Minnesota which lies thirteen miles to the west. There are no roads that lead out to the point, which is only accessible on foot or by boat.

The site is the namesake of the mineral pigeonite.
