= Pyroxene =

Group of inosilicate minerals with single chains of silica tetrahedra

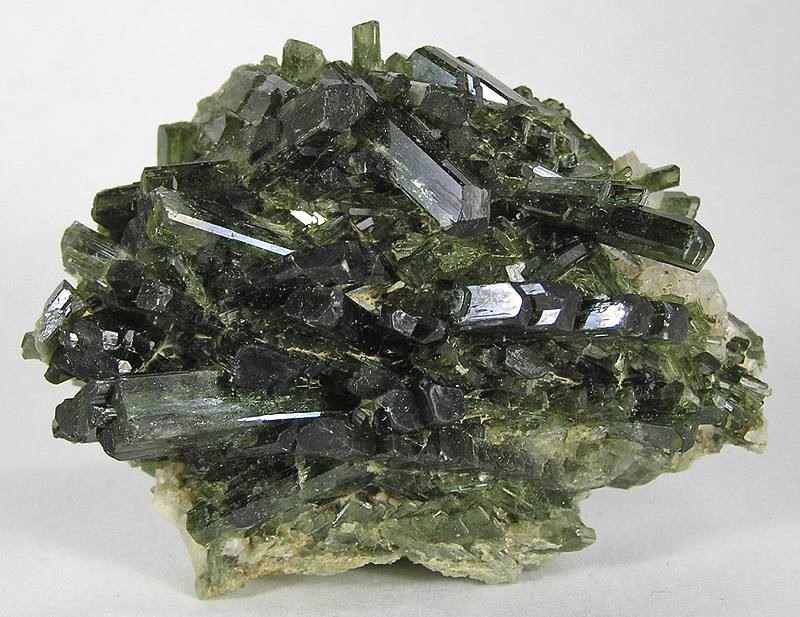
Pyroxene (diopside) crystals from Afghanistan

The pyroxenes (commonly abbreviated Px) are a group of important rock-forming inosilicate minerals found in many igneous and metamorphic rocks. Pyroxenes have the general formula XY(Si,Al)_{2}O_{6}, where X represents ions of calcium (Ca), sodium (Na), iron (Fe(II)) or magnesium (Mg) and more rarely zinc, manganese or lithium, and Y represents ions of smaller size, such as chromium (Cr), aluminium (Al), magnesium (Mg), cobalt (Co), manganese (Mn), scandium (Sc), titanium (Ti), vanadium (V) or even iron (Fe(II) or Fe(III)). Although aluminium substitutes extensively for silicon in silicates such as feldspars and amphiboles, the substitution occurs only to a limited extent in most pyroxenes. They share a common structure consisting of single chains of silica tetrahedra. Pyroxenes that crystallize in the monoclinic system are known as clinopyroxenes and those that crystallize in the orthorhombic system are known as orthopyroxenes.

The name pyroxene is derived from the Ancient Greek words for 'fire' (πυρ, pur) and 'stranger' (ξένος, xénos). Pyroxenes were so named due to their presence in volcanic lavas, where they are sometimes found as crystals embedded in volcanic glass; it was assumed they were impurities in the glass, hence the name meaning "fire stranger". However, they are simply early-forming minerals that crystallized before the lava erupted.

The upper mantle of Earth is composed mainly of olivine and pyroxene minerals. Pyroxene and feldspar are the major minerals in basalt, andesite, and gabbro rocks.

== Structure ==
Pyroxenes are the most common single-chain silicate minerals (the only other important group of single-chain silicates, the pyroxenoids, are much less common.) Their structure consists of parallel chains of negatively-charged silica tetrahedra bonded together by metal cations. In other words, each silicon ion in a pyroxene crystal is surrounded by four oxygen ions forming a tetrahedron around the relatively small silicon ion. Each silicon ion shares two oxygen ions with neighboring silicon ions in the chain.

The tetrahedra in the chain all face in the same direction, so that two oxygen ions are located on one face of the chain for every oxygen ion on the other face of the chain. The oxygen ions on the narrower face are described as apical oxygen ions. Pairs of chains are bound together on their apical sides by Y cations, with each Y cation surrounded by six oxygen ions. The resulting pairs of single chains have sometimes been likened to I-beams. The I-beams interlock, with additional X cations bonding the outer faces of the I-beams to neighboring I-beams and providing the remaining charge balance. This binding is relatively weak and gives pyroxenes their characteristic cleavage.

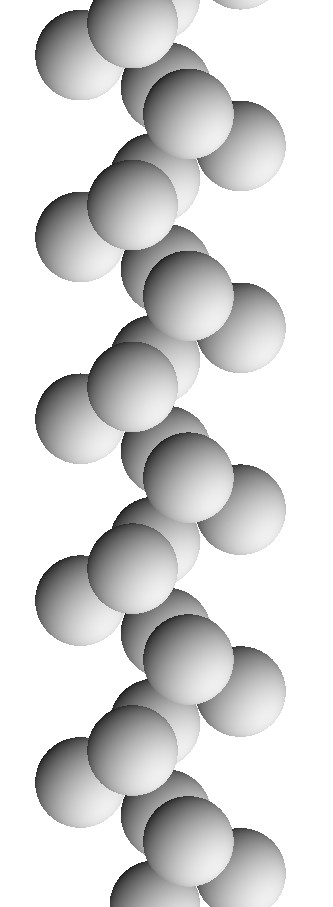
A single chain of silicon tetrahedra viewed in the [100] direction

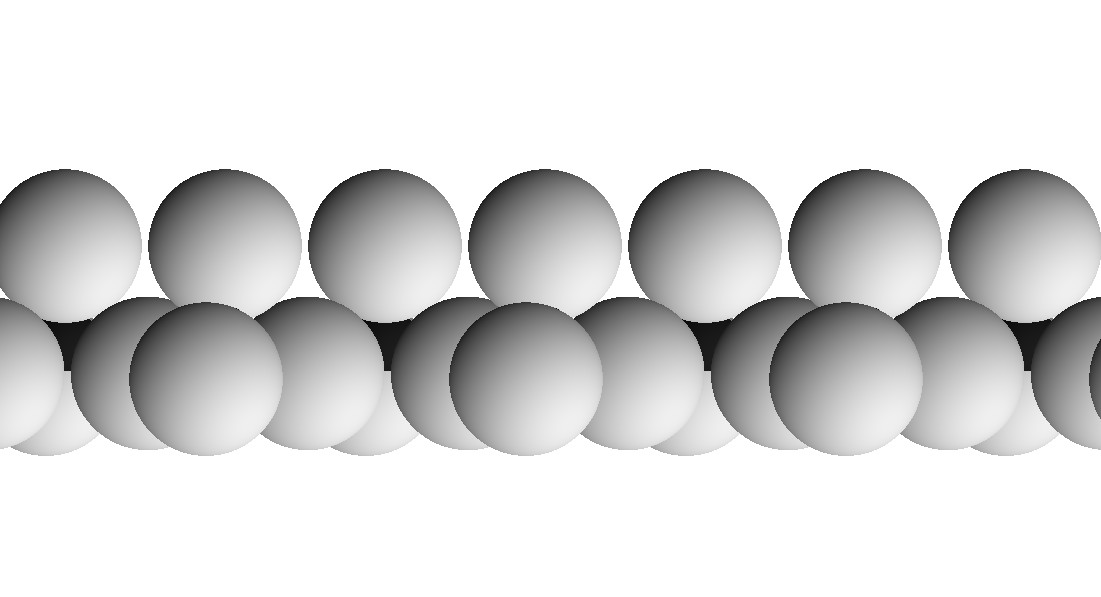
A single chain of silica tetrahedra viewed in the [010] direction

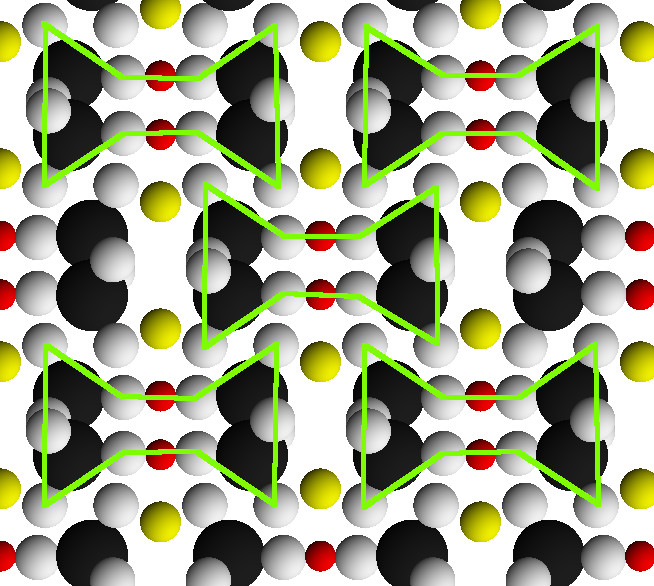
Structure of pyroxene looking along the silica chains. "I-beams" are outlined in green. Silicon ions are oversized to emphasize the silicon chains.

== Chemistry and nomenclature ==
The chain silicate structure of the pyroxenes offers much flexibility in the incorporation of various cations and the names of the pyroxene minerals are primarily defined by their chemical composition. Pyroxene minerals are named according to the chemical species occupying the X (or M2) site, the Y (or M1) site, and the tetrahedral T site. Cations in Y (M1) site are closely bound to 6 oxygens in octahedral coordination. Cations in the X (M2) site can be coordinated with 6 to 8 oxygen atoms, depending on the cation size. As of 1989, twenty mineral names are recognised by the International Mineralogical Association's Commission on New Minerals and Mineral Names and 105 previously used names have been discarded.

Pyroxene nomenclature

Pyroxene quadrilateral nomenclature of the calcium, magnesium, iron pyroxenes

Pyroxene triangle nomenclature of the sodium pyroxenes

A typical pyroxene has mostly silicon in the tetrahedral site and predominantly ions with a charge of +2 in both the X and Y sites, giving the approximate formula XYT_{2}O_{6}. The names of the common calcium–iron–magnesium pyroxenes are defined in the 'pyroxene quadrilateral'. The enstatite-ferrosilite series ([Mg,Fe]SiO_{3}) includes the common rock-forming mineral hypersthene, contains up to 5 mol.% calcium and exists in three polymorphs, orthorhombic orthoenstatite and protoenstatite and monoclinic clinoenstatite (and the ferrosilite equivalents). Increasing the calcium content prevents the formation of the orthorhombic phases and pigeonite ([Mg,Fe,Ca][Mg,Fe]Si_{2}O_{6}) only crystallises in the monoclinic system. There is no complete solid solution in calcium content and Mg-Fe-Ca pyroxenes with calcium contents between about 15 and 25 mol.% are not stable with respect to a pair of exolved crystals. This leads to a miscibility gap between pigeonite and augite compositions. There is an arbitrary separation between augite and the diopside-hedenbergite (CaMgSi_{2}O_{6}−CaFeSi_{2}O_{6}) solid solution. The divide is taken at > 45 mol.% Ca. As the calcium ion cannot occupy the Y site, pyroxene with more than 50 mol.% calcium is not possible. A related mineral, wollastonite (CaSiO_{3}), has the formula of the hypothetical calcium end member (Ca_{2}Si_{2}O_{6}), but important structural differences mean that it is instead classified as a pyroxenoid.

Magnesium, calcium and iron are by no means the only cations that can occupy the X and Y sites in the pyroxene structure. A second important series of pyroxene minerals is the sodium-rich pyroxenes, corresponding to the 'pyroxene triangle' nomenclature. The inclusion of sodium, which has a charge of 1+, into the pyroxene implies the need for a mechanism to make up the "missing" positive charge. In jadeite and aegirine, this is added by the inclusion of a 3+ cation (aluminium and iron(III), respectively) on the Y site. Sodium pyroxenes with more than 20 mol.% calcium, magnesium or iron(II) components are known as omphacite and aegirine-augite. With 80% or more of these components, the pyroxene is classified using the quadrilateral diagram.

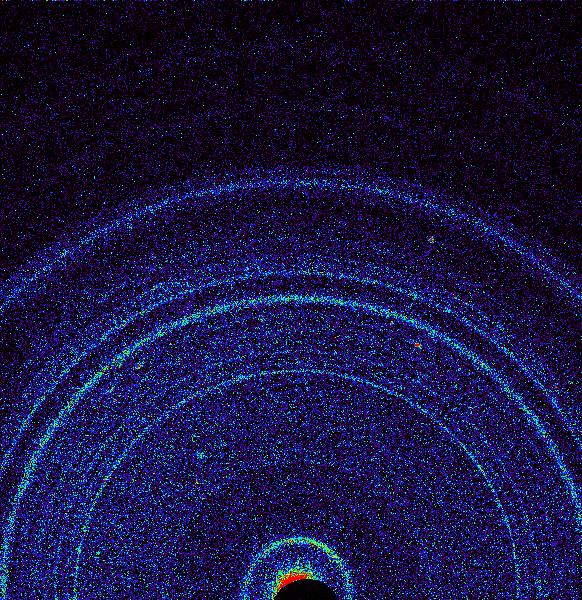
First X-ray diffraction view of Martian soil – CheMin analysis reveals feldspar, pyroxenes, olivine and more (Curiosity rover at "Rocknest")

A wide range of other cations can be accommodated in the different sites of pyroxene structures.

Order of cation occupation in the pyroxenes
T	Si	Al	Fe^{3+}
Y		Al	Fe^{3+}	Ti^{4+}	Cr	V	Ti^{3+}	Zr	Sc	Zn	Mg	Fe^{2+}	Mn
X											Mg	Fe^{2+}	Mn	Li	Ca	Na

In assigning ions to sites, the basic rule is to work from left to right in this table, first assigning all silicon to the T site and then filling the site with the remaining aluminium and finally iron(III); extra aluminium or iron can be accommodated in the Y site and bulkier ions on the X site.

Not all the resulting mechanisms to achieve charge neutrality follow the sodium example above, and there are several alternative schemes:

1. Coupled substitutions of 1+ and 3+ ions on the X and Y sites respectively. For example, Na and Al give the jadeite (NaAlSi_{2}O_{6}) composition.
2. Coupled substitution of a 1+ ion on the X site and a mixture of equal numbers of 2+ and 4+ ions on the Y site. This leads to e.g., NaFe^{2+}_{0.5}Ti^{4+}_{0.5}Si_{2}O_{6}.
3. The Tschermak substitution where a 3+ ion occupies the Y site and a T site, leading to e.g., CaAlAlSiO_{6}.

In nature, more than one substitution may be found in the same mineral.

== Pyroxene minerals ==
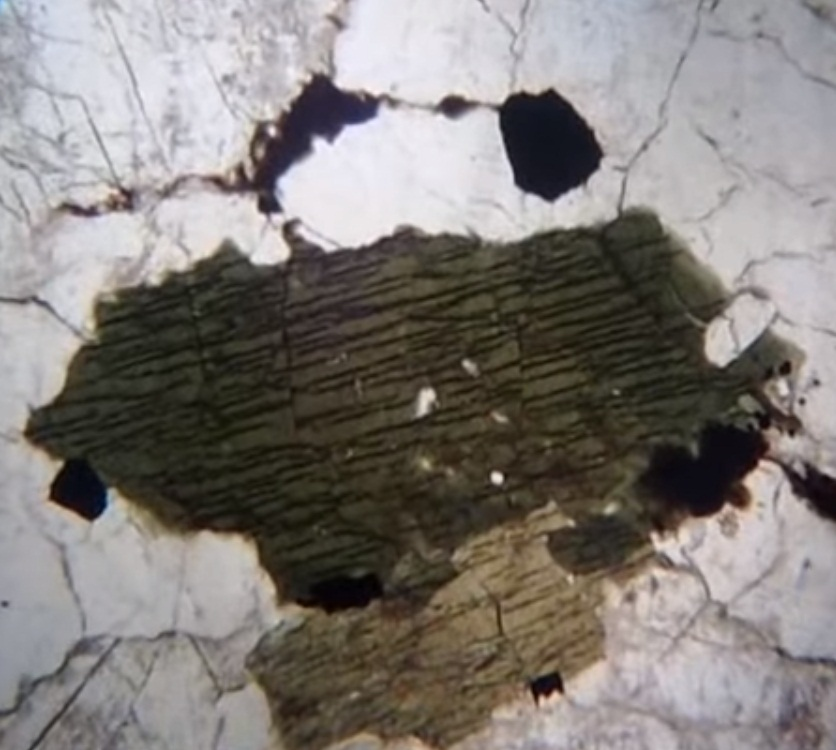
A thin section of green pyroxene

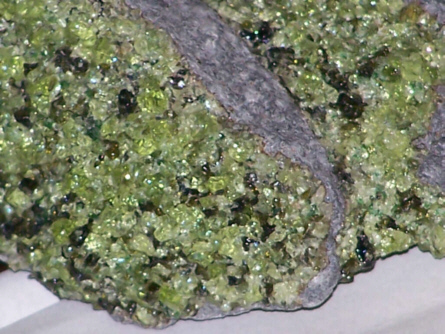
Mantle-peridotite xenolith from San Carlos Indian Reservation, Gila Co., Arizona, US. The xenolith is dominated by green peridot olivine, together with black orthopyroxene and spinel crystals, and rare grass-green cr-diopside grains. The fine-grained gray rock in this image is the host basalt.(unknown scale).

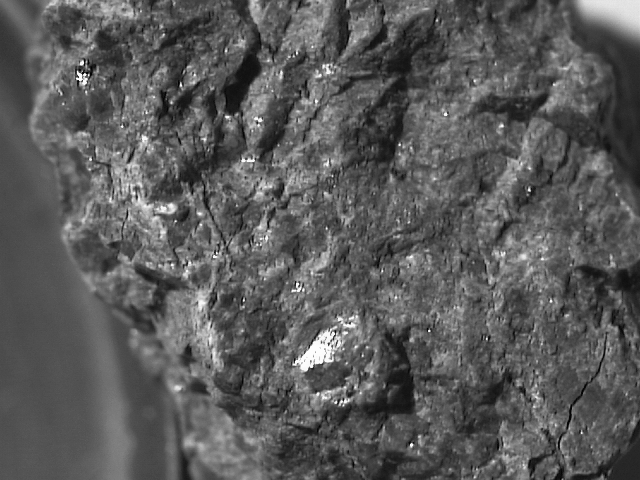
A sample of pyroxenite (meteorite ALH84001 from Mars), a rock consisting mostly of pyroxene minerals

- Clinopyroxenes (monoclinic)
  - Aegirine, NaFe^{3+}Si_{2}O_{6}
  - Augite, (Ca,Na)(Mg,Fe,Al,Ti)(Si,Al)_{2}O_{6}
  - Clinoenstatite, MgSiO_{3}
  - Diopside, CaMgSi_{2}O_{6}
  - Esseneite, CaFe^{3+}[AlSiO_{6}]
  - Hedenbergite, CaFe^{2+}Si_{2}O_{6}
  - Jadeite, Na(Al,Fe^{3+})Si_{2}O_{6}
  - Jervisite, (Na,Ca,Fe^{2+})(Sc,Mg,Fe^{2+})Si_{2}O_{6}
  - Johannsenite, CaMn^{2+}Si_{2}O_{6}
  - Kanoite, Mn^{2+}(Mg,Mn^{2+})Si_{2}O_{6}
  - Kosmochlor, NaCrSi_{2}O_{6}
  - Namansilite, NaMn^{3+}Si_{2}O_{6}
  - Natalyite, NaV^{3+}Si_{2}O_{6}
  - Omphacite, (Ca,Na)(Mg,Fe^{2+},Al)Si_{2}O_{6}
  - Petedunnite, Ca(Zn,Mn^{2+},Mg,Fe^{2+})Si_{2}O_{6}
  - Pigeonite, (Ca,Mg,Fe)(Mg,Fe)Si_{2}O_{6}
  - Spodumene, LiAl(SiO_{3})_{2}
- Orthopyroxenes (orthorhombic)
  - Enstatite, Mg_{2}Si_{2}O_{6}
  - Bronzite, intermediate between enstatite and hypersthene
  - Hypersthene, (Mg,Fe)SiO_{3}
  - Eulite, intermediate between hypersthene and ferrosilite
  - Ferrosilite, Fe_{2}Si_{2}O_{6}
  - Donpeacorite, (MgMn)MgSi_{2}O_{6}
  - Nchwaningite, Mn^{2+}_{2}SiO_{3}(OH)_{2}·(H_{2}O)

== See also ==
- Clinopyroxene thermobarometry
- Emerald – sometimes substituted in jewelry by hiddenite, a green variety of spodumene.
- Rhodonite
- Wollastonite
