= Hedenbergite =

Iron-rich pyroxene mineral

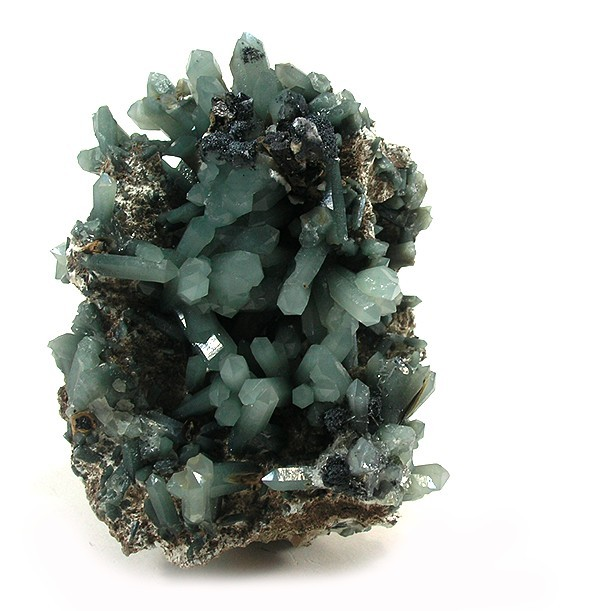

General
- Category: Inosilicate minerals (single chain)
- Group: Pyroxene group, clinopyroxene subgroup
- Formula: CaFeSi_{2}O_{6} (CaFe(SiO_{3})_{2})
- IMA symbol: Hd
- Strunz classification: 9.DA.15
- Crystal system: Monoclinic
- Crystal class: Prismatic (2/m) (same H-M symbol)
- Space group: C2/c

Identification
- Formula mass: 248.09 g/mol
- Color: Brownish green, black
- Crystal habit: Massive, prismatic crystals
- Cleavage: Good on {110}
- Fracture: Irregular
- Tenacity: Brittle
- Mohs scale hardness: 5.5–6.5
- Luster: Vitreous, dull
- Streak: White, gray
- Diaphaneity: Transparent-Opaque
- Density: 3.56 g/cm^{3}
- Optical properties: Biaxial (+)
- Refractive index: nα = 1.699 – 1.739 nβ = 1.705 – 1.745 nγ = 1.728 – 1.757
- Birefringence: δ = 0.029
- Pleochroism: Weak
- Dispersion: r > v strong

Hedenbergite, CaFeSi_{2}O_{6} (CaFe(SiO_{3})_{2}), is the iron-rich end member of the pyroxene group having a monoclinic crystal system. The mineral is extremely rarely found as a pure substance, and usually has to be synthesized in a lab. It was named in 1819 after M.A. Ludwig Hedenberg, who was the first to define hedenbergite as a mineral. Contact metamorphic rocks high in iron are the primary geologic setting for hedenbergite. This mineral is unique because it can be found in chondrites and skarns (calc–silicate metamorphic rocks). As a member of the pyroxene family, it has generated considerable interest due to its significance in general geologic processes.

== Properties ==
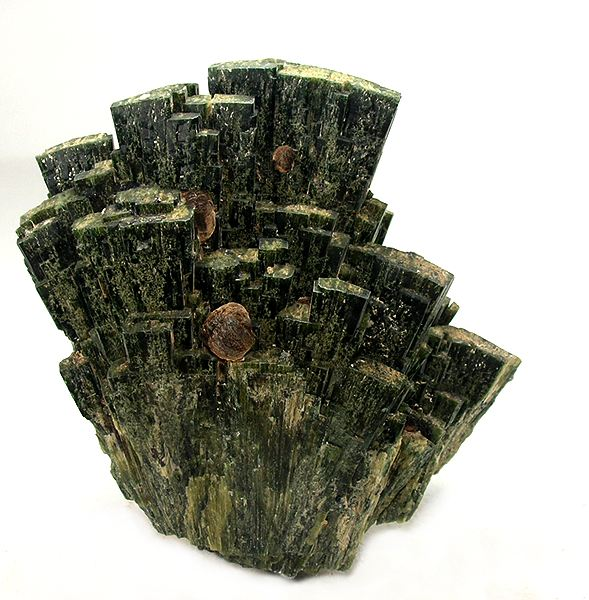
Spray of variegated green and lustrous Hedenbergite crystals to 9 cm (3.5 in) with rounded garnets

Hedenbergite exhibits several distinct properties. Its hardness is usually between five and six, with two cleavage planes and conchoidal fracture. Color varies between black, greenish black, and dark brown with a resinous luster. Hedenbergite is a part of a pyroxene solid solution chain consisting of diopside and augite, and is the iron-rich end member. One of the best indicators that you have located hedenbergite is the radiating prisms with a monoclinic crystal system. Hedenbergite is found primarily in metamorphic rocks.

== Composition and structure ==
Pyroxene quadrilateral

The pyroxene quadrilateral easily records the compositions of different pyroxenes contained in igneous rocks, such as diopside, hedenbergite, enstatite, ferrosilite. Hedenbergite is almost never found isolated. From the chemical formulas above, we can tell that the main differences in the compositions will be in terms of calcium, magnesium, and iron. D. H. Lindsley and J. L. Munoz (1969) conducted an experiment to determine which combinations of temperature and pressure would cause particular minerals to form. According to their experiment, at 1000 degrees with a pressure less than two kilobars, the stable composition is a mixture of hedenbergite, olivine, and quartz. When the pressure reaches twenty kilobars, the composition shifts towards the clinopyroxenes, which contain trace amounts of hedenbergite, if any. At temperatures of 750 °C, the compositions transition from hedenbergite with olivine and quartz to ferrosilite, with a greater proportion of hedenbergite. If you combine the results of both of these sets of data, you can see that the stability of hedenbergite is more dependent on temperature as opposed to pressure.

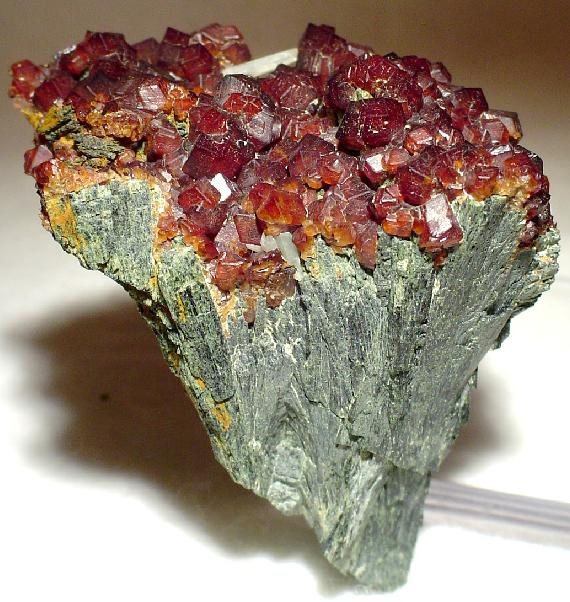
Hedenbergite with andradite garnet from the Cyclades

== Effects of chemical composition on elasticity ==
Pyroxenes are essential to the geologic processes that occur in the mantle and transition zones. One crystal was oriented with the C axis, and another perpendicular to the C axis. The elastic strength of a polyhedron is determined by the cation occupying the central site. As the bond length of the cations and anions decreases, the bond strength increases, making the mineral more compact and dense. Substitution between ions like Ca^{2+} and Mg^{2+} would not have a significant effect on the resistance to compression. In contrast, substitution of Si^{4+} would make it much harder to compress. Si^{4+} would be inherently stronger than Ca^{2+} due to the larger charge and electronegativity.

== Occurrence in chondrites ==
Chondrites are meteorites that have experienced minimal alteration by melting or differentiation since the formation of the Solar System 4.56 billion years ago. One of the most studied chondrites in existence is the Allende meteorite. Hedenbergite was found to be the most abundant secondary calcium-rich silicate phase within Allende chondrules and is closely associated with other minerals such as sodalite and nepheline. Kimura and Ikeda (1995) also suggest that hedenbergite formation may have been the result of the consumption of CaO and SiO_{2} as plagioclases decomposed into sodalite and nepheline as well as alkali-calcium exchange before the condrules' incorporation into the parent body.

== Occurrence in skarns ==
Hedenbergite can be found in skarns. A skarn is a metamorphic rock that is formed by the chemical alterations of the original minerals by hydrothermal causes. Significant chemical reactions between adjacent lithologies form them. The Nickel Plate gold skarn deposit of the Hedley District in southern British Columbia is characterized by hedenbergitic pyroxene.

== See also ==
- Classification of minerals
- List of minerals
