= Mary Lou Ridinger =

American archaeologist (born 1945)

- Born: 1945 (age 79–80); Fort Worth, Texas, U.S.
- Education: University of Colorado Boulder (BA); Universidad de las Américas Puebla (MA)
- Occupation: Archaeologist
- Spouse: Jay Ridinger
- Scientific career
- Fields: Archaeology

Mary Lou Ridinger (born 1945 in Fort Worth, Texas) is an American archaeologist. She holds a B.A. in Latin American Studies from the University of Colorado Boulder and an M.A. in Archaeology from the University of the Americas After her graduate studies, Ridinger lived in San Miguel de Allende, Mexico and worked on a number of archeological digs in the country, including the excavation preceding the construction of Mexico City's subway system. She is known for her discovery of in-situ jade quarry sites in Guatemala that had been lost since the time of the Spanish Conquest of the Americas, although a previous discovery of another in-situ jadeite quarry in Guatemala was made by others earlier in the mid 20th-century.

== Discovery of Guatemalan Jade Sources ==
Ridinger may be widely regarded among scholars as the first archaeologist to discover the in-situ locations of the pre-Columbian Maya jadeite jade quarry areas. However, in 1952, the first documented discovery of in-situ jadeite in a pre-Columbian Maya jadeite quarry was made by Robert E. Leslie in the Motagua River valley near Manzanal, Guatemala, as documented in a 1955 publication co-authored by Leslie with William F. Foshag, who, at the time, was Head Curator of the Smithsonian Institution Department of Geology. In 1975, In partnership with her late husband Jay Ridinger, Mary Lou Ridinger discovered three distinct sources for jadeite in the Motagua river valley of Guatemala, and also discovered tools and other indications that pre-Columbian Maya artisans had worked the material at the source site.

In years that followed, Ridinger and her husband discovered new types of jade that had previously been unknown, uncovering in 1987 a dark colored jade with pyrite inclusions now dubbed "Galactic Jade" and followed in 1998 by the discovery of a lavender variety of jadeite.

== Jade Enterprise in Guatemala ==
Jadeite crafts and jewelry is now a staple craft industry in Guatemala. In 1975, Mary Lou and Jay Ridinger opened Jades S.A., the first post-conquest jade workshop in the western hemisphere, and began training stone carvers to work with the very dense mineral. She is recognized by such organizations as The Explorers Club and the Marquis Who's Who as the founder of the modern jade business in Guatemala. Notable figures such as President Bill Clinton and actor Robert Redford have visited her business in Antigua Guatemala and commended her work. Jades S.A. is now frequently visited by foreign dignitaries as well as local government officials and houses a sizeable museum wing illustrating the history and timeline of the use of jadeite by the Maya and pre-Maya inhabitants of Central America.

== Public Recognition ==
She has been featured in National Geographic (Sept 1987 Vol. 172 no.3), the Discovery channel (June 5, 1999, "The Mystery of Jade"), and numerous other publications and media appearances. She and her late husband Jay Ridinger's story has been featured in a recent book, Stone of Kings (2012) by Gerard Helferich.

== Philanthropy ==
In 2008, upon a successful campaign to divert a highway project from running through portions of the Izapa archeological site, Ridinger and her sister Georgeann Johnson founded The Maya Conservancy, a 501c non-profit organization with the stated mission "to aid in the preservation and protection of Maya and Pre-Maya archaeological sites throughout Central America and Mexico, in the preservation and conservation of Maya Cultural Heritage, and in educational guidance and financial assistance to private and governmental bodies in these countries." The Maya Conservancy has notable Maya scholars on its board, such as Dr. David Sedat from the Copan project and Dr. Robert Sitler.
