= Costa Rican jade tradition =

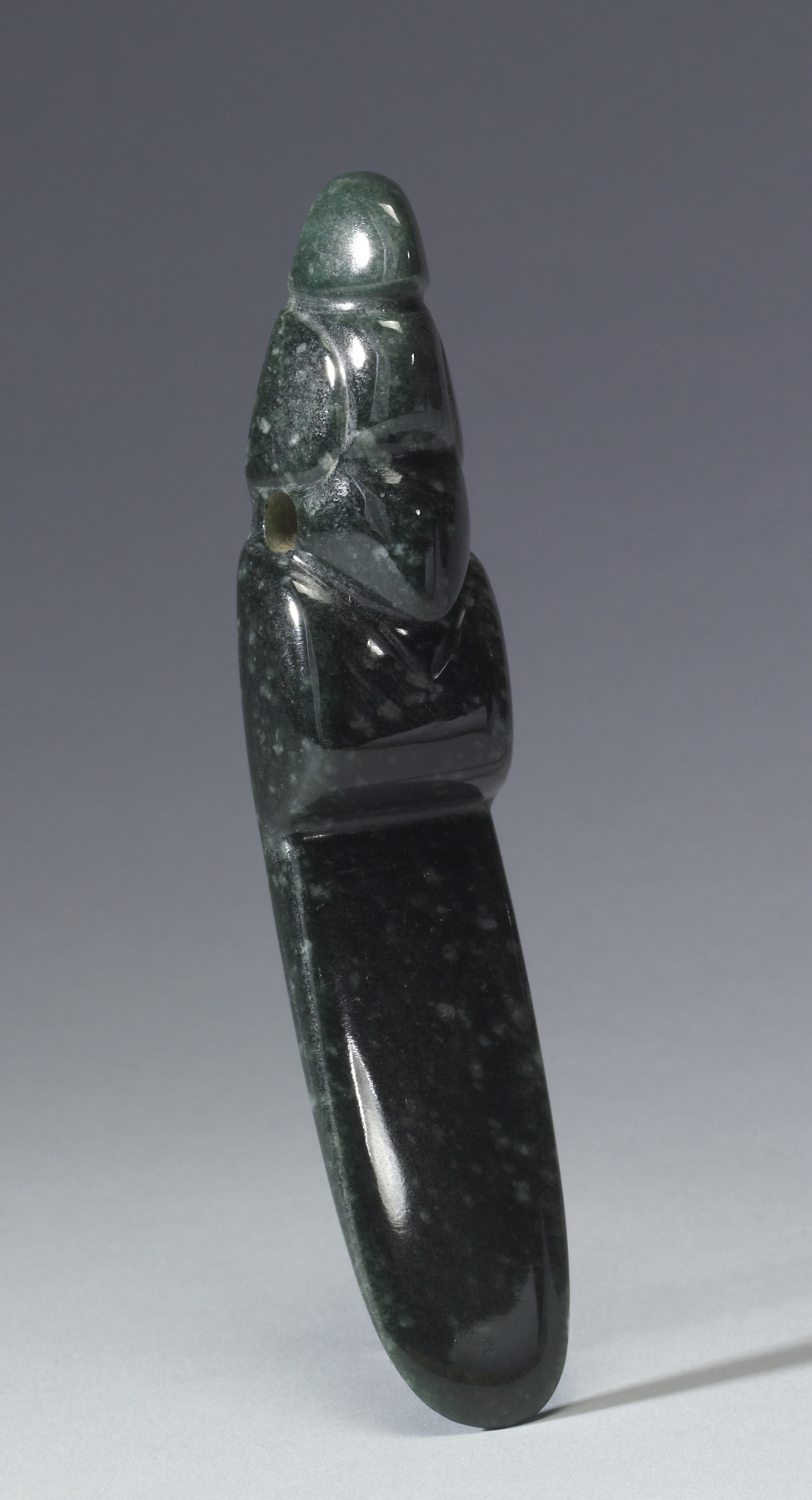
Jade bird pendant from Costa Rica

Jadeite is presumed one of the most precious materials of Pre-Columbian Costa Rica. It, along with other similar-looking greenstones (e.g. chalcedony, serpentine, and green jasper) were cherished and worked for years. Jadeite was used to decorate the body and was presumably a symbol of power.

== Timeline ==
There are three main periods in Costa Rican Jade Tradition, they correspond with the second half of Mid-Preclassic to Late Classic Periods in Mesoamerica.

1. Beginning Period: 500 BC- 300 AD
2. Fluorescent Period: 300-900 AD
3. Decadent Period: 700-900 AD

The end of the jade tradition in Costa Rica corresponds with the beginning of gold work.

== Jade working ==
Jadeite rates between 6 and 7 on the Mohs scale of hardness, therefore making it extremely tough and time-consuming to work because it was necessary to use minerals of equal or harder value. Abrasive powders made of these minerals were often used to carve into the material. Some of the main techniques used were pecking, drilling, sawing, carving, engraving and grinding. String sawing was a technique likely developed by Costa Rican lapidaries, in the northeastern region. This technique was done by sawing with a cord and a powdered abrasive. It was used to create curved slits openings, and by drilling a hole in the middle of a piece you could thread the cord through and create a hole. The final process was polishing.

Presumed patterns:

High-intensity: this pattern of jade working characterizes the jade objects that took the most time to complete, sometimes years. They were more time consuming in addition to being more elaborately decorated, with deeper incisions.
Low-intensity: this pattern was less time consuming and could be made of softer materials, greenstones that looked like jadeite. They were less valuable because they were made from local materials. It was socially motivated by the high-intensity pattern.

== Jade objects ==
Most of the jade objects recorded are from looted context, but when found in situ the objects are primarily in graves. The bulk of Costa Rican jades contain drilled holes so they can be utilized to decorate the body in bead and pendant form. There are three main types of objects listed here.

1. Axe Gods: Generally these are stylized figure pendants that look like they were made from axes or celts. They are two-dimensionally decorated on the front with three main segments. The first is the top of the head to the top of the shoulders, where holes are drilled to suspend the object. The second is from the top of the shoulders to the bottom of the wings or arms. The third section is the blade of the pendant, it goes from the bottom of the wings or arms to the base, which consists of 30-40% of the entire pendant. There are two types of Axe god figurines, Avian and Anthropomorphic. The earliest known jade work is the Avian axe god celt found at the site of La Regla, dated at 500 BC.

2. Beak Birds: These are characteristic for their large, stylized beak. All were drilled through their neck so when strung to hang the beak would be projecting. The figures are very diverse in size and shape. The beaks are either straight, or curved pointing up or down. Some of the beaks are curved into a spiral, and attached to the body presenting the string saw technique.

3. Bar Pendants: These are horizontal and usually winged. They are drilled with two holes through the length of the pendant or drilled parallel to each other through the width of the pendant. Examples of this type are open-winged bats, double headed winged bats, double headed bar with reptile heads at either end, opened winged bats with reptile heads at both ends, or plain with no incised decoration.

== Likely source and trade patterns ==
Most of the jade work in Costa Rica was done with a particular type. It was a deep, blue-green color, and the same type the Olmecs used. In 1998 an enormous region of this particular jade was uncovered after a hurricane in Guatemala. The area is located in south east Guatemala In the Motagua River Valley. It is about the size of Rhode Island, and has evidence of ancient mining. This is the likely source of both the Olmec and Costa Rican jade. This implies a significant long-distance trade. Postulated by David Mora-Marín there was a direct exchange network between the previously mentioned area in Guatemala (in the Mayan lowlands) and the northwestern/ central areas of Costa Rica between 300 BC and 800 AD, in which Costa Ricans obtain jade. The jade tradition died down after the collapse of the Mayan city of Copan, the presumed trade center for the jade.
