= Pigeon Bay =

- Location within Minnesota
- Location: Between Minnesota, United States, and Ontario, Canada
- Coordinates: 48°00′00″N 89°30′00″W
- Type: Bay
- Part of: Lake Superior
- River sources: Pigeon River, Little Pigeon Bay, Pine Bay and tributaries.
- Primary outflows: Lake Superior
- Basin countries: United States; Canada
- Max. length: 1 mi (1.6 km)
- Max. width: 3–4 mi (4.8–6.4 km)
- Surface elevation: 602 ft (183 m)
- Islands: Boundary Island, Marin Island, Owen Island

Pigeon Bay is a body of water that lies between Minnesota, United States and Ontario, Canada and is part of Lake Superior. The international boundary between the two countries lies in the middle of the bay. The name of "Pigeon" Bay was most likely from the prevalence of the passenger pigeon which was common in the US/Canada border region.

Grand Portage State Park is on the Minnesota side of the bay, and Pigeon River is on the Ontario side of the bay.
