= Miscibility gap =

Property of chemical mixtures

A miscibility gap is a region in a phase diagram for a mixture of components where the mixture exists as two or more phases – any region of composition of mixtures where the constituents are not completely miscible.

The IUPAC Gold Book defines miscibility gap as "Area within the coexistence curve of an isobaric phase diagram (temperature vs composition) or an isothermal phase diagram (pressure vs composition)."

A miscibility gap between isostructural phases may be described as the solvus, a term also used to describe the boundary on a phase diagram between a miscibility gap and other phases.

Thermodynamically, miscibility gaps indicate a maximum (e.g. of Gibbs energy) in the composition range.

The miscibility gap condition is a candidate for thermal storage.

== Named miscibility gaps ==
A number of miscibility gaps in phase systems are named, including

- The huttenlocher (found in bytownite, anorthite composition An55-95), boggild (in labradorite, An39-48 and An53-63) and peristerite (in oligoclase, ~An5-15) miscibility gaps in the plagioclase feldspars.
- A Nishwawa horn, term for a miscibility gap existing when phases with different magnetic properties co-exist in the phase diagram.
- Miscibility gaps in liquid states can cause spinodal decomposition, commonly referred to as oiling out, as commonly occurs in oil/water mixtures.

== See also ==
- Miscibility
- Solid solution
- Incongruent melting
