= Rubicline =

Rubidium feldspar mineral

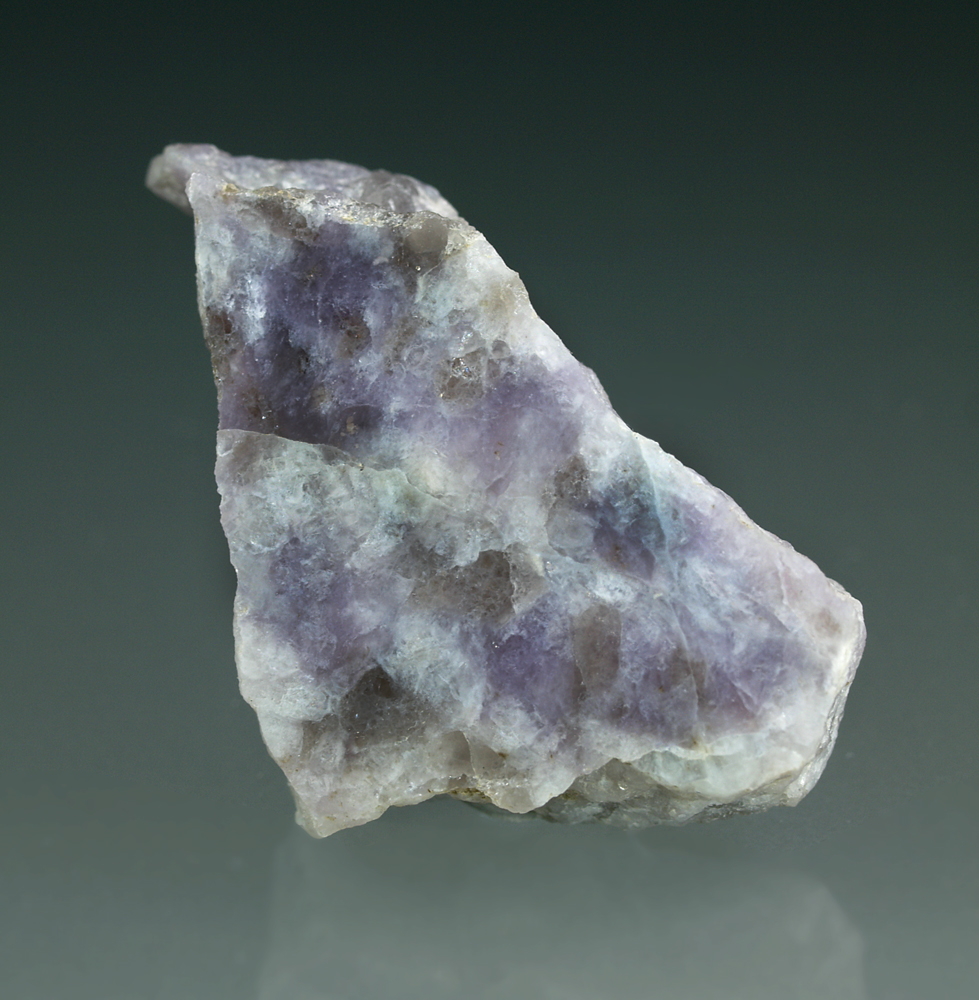

General
- Category: Tectosilicate minerals
- Group: Feldspar group
- Series: Alkali feldspar series
- Formula: (Rb, K)[AlSi_{3}O_{8}]
- IMA symbol: Rub
- IMA status: Approved (1998)
- Strunz classification: 9.FA.30
- Crystal system: Monoclinic
- Crystal class: Prismatic (2/m)
- Space group: B2/m (no. 12)

Identification
- Formula mass: 313.11 g/mol
- Color: Colorless
- Cleavage: {001}
- Mohs scale hardness: 6
- Luster: Vitreous
- Diaphaneity: Transparent
- Density: 2.8 g/cm^{3}
- Optical properties: biaxial
- Refractive index: n_{α} = 1.520 n_{β} = 1.524 n_{γ} = 1.527
- Birefringence: δ = 0.007
- Dispersion: Strong
- Other characteristics: Radioactive

Rubicline, also referred to as Rb-microcline, is the rubidium analogue of microcline, an important tectosilicate mineral. Its chemical formula is (Rb, K)[AlSi_{3}O_{8}] with an ideal composition of RbAlSi_{3}O_{8}. Chemical analysis by electron microprobe indicated the average weight of the crystal is 56.66% SiO_{2}, 16.95% Al_{2}O_{3}, and 23.77% Rb_{2}O, along with trace amounts of caesium oxide (Cs_{2}O) and iron(III) oxide (Fe_{2}O_{3}).

Rubicline was first discovered in 1998 in Elba, Italy, by a team from the University of Manitoba. It was the first mineral to have been discovered with rubidium as an essential constituent. It has also been found in Mozambique and the Kola Peninsula in Russia. Rubicline occurs as small, abundant, rounded grains found within veins of rubidian microcline. Pure rubicline with an ideal potassium-free composition has never been found in nature. Rubicline was synthesized in 2001 by placing powdered albite in a solvent of RbCl. This mixture was then placed in a silver tube containing H_{2}O, heated to 400 °C and pressurized to 60 MPa.

Unlike microcline, which can be yellow, red, or green, rubicline is colorless. It is also transparent, brittle, and has a vitreous luster. Rubicline has been classified as both triclinic and monoclinic. The crystal does not show twinning. Other minerals in this group include adularia, anorthoclase, buddingtonite, celsian, hyalophane, microcline, monalbite, orthoclase, and sanidine.

Like all rubidium compounds, rubicline is mildly radioactive. Activity and dose rate of various amounts of rubicline are listed in the table below.

Specimen weight/size	Calculated activity (Bq)	Calculated activity (Ci)	Estimated activity GR(api)	Estimated exposure (mRem)/hr*
1000 g / 8.79 cm	183,355	4.96×10^{−6}	8,449.31	2.78
100 g / 4.08 cm	18,336	4.96×10^{−7}	844.93	0.28
10 g / 1.89 cm	1,834	4.96×10^{−8}	84.49	0.03
1 g / 8.79 mm	183	4.96×10^{−9}	8.45	0.00
0.1 g / 4.08 mm	18	4.96×10^{−10}	0.84	0.00
0.01 g / 1.89 mm	2	4.96×10^{−11}	0.08	0.00
0.001 g / 0.88 mm	0	4.96×10^{−12}	0.01	0.00

- If held in hand for one hour.
- Government estimate of average annual exposure (360 mRem)
- Max permissible adult dose 50,000 mRem/yr (hands), 15,000 mRem/yr (eyes)
- Lethal exposure 400,000 to 500,000 mRem
