= Celsia =

Celsia can refer to:

== Plants ==
- Celsia Boehm., nom. illeg., considered a synonym of Colchicum
- Celsia Heist. ex Fabr., nom. illeg., considered a synonym of Ornithogalum
- Verbascum, various species, particularly V. bugulifolium, a garden plant formerly known as Celsia bugulifolia

== Insects ==
- Staurophora celsia, a moth

== Other ==
- An electricity generation and distribution company owned by Grupo Argos

== See also ==
- Celsian, a feldspar mineral
