= Erebus crystal =

Anorthoclase crystal found in Antarctica

- An erebus crystal

General
- Category: Tectosilicate minerals
- Group: Feldspar group
- Series: Alkali feldspar series
- Formula: (Na,K)AlSi_{3}O_{8}
- IMA status: Variety of anorthoclase (albite)
- Crystal system: Triclinic

Identification
- Color: Colorless, also white, pale creamy yellow, red, green
- Crystal habit: Short prismatic crystals; tabular, rhombic, flattened along [010]
- Twinning: Polysynthetic twinning produces a grid pattern on [100]
- Cleavage: Perfect on [001], other partings
- Fracture: Uneven
- Tenacity: Brittle
- Mohs scale hardness: 6
- Luster: Vitreous to pearly on cleavage planes
- Streak: White
- Diaphaneity: Transparent

An erebus crystal is a crystal of anorthoclase (a type of feldspar) found in the immediate area surrounding Mount Erebus near McMurdo Station, Antarctica. This type of feldspar is rich in sodium, potassium, and aluminium silicate. Similar crystals have also been reported on Mount Kenya and Mount Kilimanjaro.

Though the formation and growth of these crystals is not well understood, it is evident that the crystals grow in the magma beneath Mount Erebus and are ejected out of the mountain encased in glassy volcanic bombs. This glass structure quickly weathers away leaving the mountainside covered in crystals.
