= Anorthoclase =

Alkali feldspar mineral

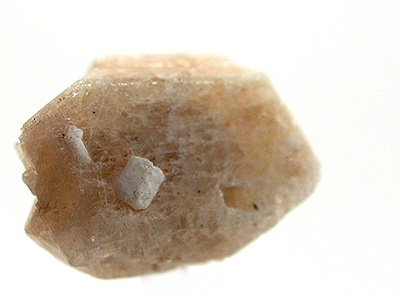
- Doubly terminated anorthoclase crystal from Kinki Region, Honshu, Japan. Size: 1.3 cm × 0.9 cm × 0.7 cm (0.5 in × 0.4 in × 0.3 in)

General
- Category: Tectosilicate minerals
- Group: Feldspar group
- Series: Alkali feldspar series
- Formula: (Na,K)AlSi_{3}O_{8}
- IMA symbol: Ano
- IMA status: Variety of albite
- Strunz classification: 9.FA.30
- Dana classification: 76.1.1.6
- Crystal system: Triclinic
- Crystal class: Pinacoidal (1̅)
- Space group: C1̅ (no. 2)
- Unit cell: a = 8.28, b = 12.97 c = 7.15 [Å]; α = 91.05° β = 116.26°, γ = 90.15°; Z = 4

Identification
- Color: Colorless, also white, pale creamy yellow, red, green
- Crystal habit: Short prismatic crystals; tabular, rhombic, flattened along [010]
- Twinning: Polysynthetic twinning produces a grid pattern on [100]
- Cleavage: Perfect on [001], other partings
- Fracture: Uneven
- Tenacity: Brittle
- Mohs scale hardness: 6
- Luster: Vitreous to pearly on cleavage planes
- Streak: White
- Diaphaneity: Transparent
- Specific gravity: 2.57–2.60
- Optical properties: Biaxial (−)
- Refractive index: n_{α} = 1.519–1.529 n_{β} = 1.524–1.534 n_{γ} = 1.527–1.536
- Birefringence: δ = 0.008
- 2V angle: Measured: 34°–60°

The mineral anorthoclase ((Na,K)AlSi_{3}O_{8}) is a crystalline solid solution in the alkali feldspar series, in which the proportion of the sodium-aluminium silicate member exceeds the potassium-aluminium silicate member. It typically consists of between 64 and 90 percent of NaAlSi_{3}O_{8} and between 10 and 36 percent of KAlSi_{3}O_{8}.

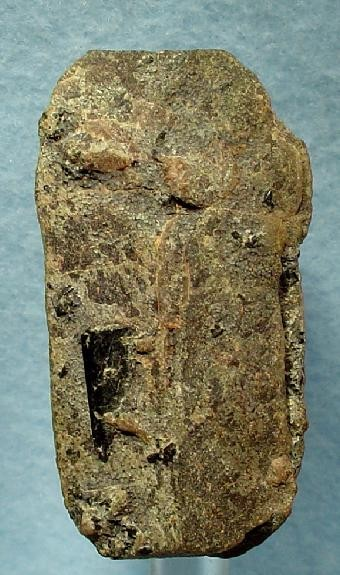
An anorthoclase crystal from Mount Erebus, Antarctica

== Structure and stability ==
Anorthoclase is an intermediate member of the high albite – sanidine alkali feldspar solid solution series. Intermediate members of this series, high albite, anorthoclase and high sodium sanidine are stable at temperatures of 600 °C (1,100 °F) and above. Below 400–600 °C (800–1,100 °F) only very limited solution exists (less than about 5% on both the low albite and microcline ends). Anorthoclase and high albite exhibit triclinic symmetry, whereas sanidine and the low temperature orthoclase have monoclinic symmetry. If the high temperature intermediate composition alkali feldspars are allowed to cool slowly, exsolution occurs and a perthite structure results.

== Occurrence ==
Anorthoclase occurs in high temperature sodium rich volcanic and hypabyssal (shallow intrusive) rocks. The mineral is typically found as a constituent of the fine grained matrix or as small phenocrysts which may occur as loose crystals in a weathered rock.

It was first described in 1885 for an occurrence on Pantelleria Island, Trapani Province, Sicily. The name is from the Greek an- (αν-), orthós (ορθός) and klásis (κλάσις) ('not cleaving at right-angles'), for its oblique cleavage.

== See also ==
- Erebus crystal
