= List of countries by feldspar production =

This is a list of countries by feldspar production based on British Geological Survey data.

Feldspar production by country (2022)
Country	Production (metric tonnes)
World	38,156,851
Turkey	15,781,540
India	4,300,000
Iran	3,200,000
China	2,400,000
Italy	2,200,000
Thailand	1,953,918
South Korea	851,046
Spain	716,535
Morocco	587,289
Saudi Arabia	550,000
Poland	540,614
Czech Republic	493,000
United States	590,000
France	450,000
Mexico	377,649
Brazil	354,001
Pakistan	322,242
Russia	300,000
Egypt	250,000
Portugal	217,766
Malaysia	216,394
Germany	205,330
Algeria	170,000
Colombia	164,783
Uzbekistan	106,000
Japan	100,000
Vietnam	100,000
South Africa	75,382
Finland	63,034
Norway	60,000
Philippines	46,000
Nigeria	44,000
Guatemala	40,000
Argentina	40,000
North Macedonia	37,482
Austria	35,000
Venezuela	30,000
Sri Lanka	26,000
Peru	24,358
Romania	22,000
Greenland	20,000
Serbia	20,000
Sweden	20,000
Ukraine	15,000
Indonesia	11,000
Slovakia	10,300
Sudan	6,000
Cuba	5,900
Australia	5,000
Uganda	1,388
Ethiopia	600
Uruguay	300
