= Mount Erebus =

Volcano on Ross Island, Antarctica

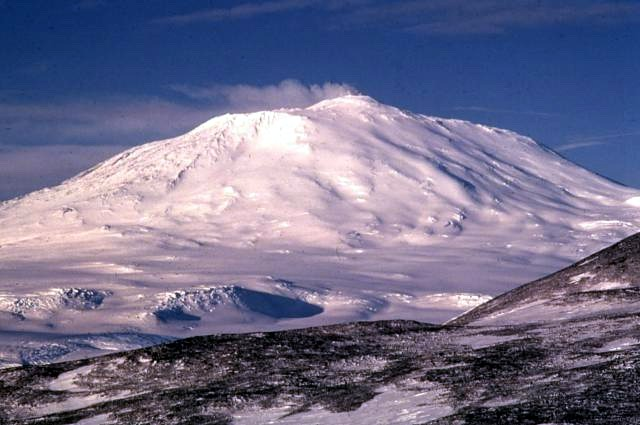
- Mount Erebus

Highest point
- Elevation: 3,792 m (12,441 ft)
- Prominence: 3,765 m (12,352 ft); Ranked 34th
- Listing: Ultra, Ribu
- Coordinates: 77°31′47″S 167°09′12″E

Geography
- Location within Antarctica
- Location: Ross Island, Antarctica (claimed by New Zealand as part of the Ross Dependency)
- Topo map: Ross Island

Geology
- Rock age: 1.3 million years
- Mountain type: Stratovolcano (composite cone)
- Volcanic belt: McMurdo Volcanic Group
- Last eruption: 2020

Climbing
- First ascent: March 10, 1908 by Edgeworth David and party. Nimrod Expedition

Mount Erebus (/ˈɛrɪbəs/) is the southernmost active volcano on Earth, located on Ross Island in the Ross Dependency in Antarctica. With a summit elevation of 3,792 metres (12,441 ft), it is the second most prominent mountain in Antarctica (after Mount Vinson) and the second-highest volcano in Antarctica (after the dormant Mount Sidley). It is the highest point on Ross Island, which is also home to three inactive volcanoes: Mount Terror, Mount Bird, and Mount Terra Nova. It makes Ross Island the sixth-highest island on Earth by highest point.

The mountain was named by Captain James Clark Ross in 1841 for his ship, HMS Erebus. The volcano has been active for around 1.3 million years and has a long-lived lava lake in its inner summit crater that has been present since at least the early 1970s. On 28 November 1979, Air New Zealand Flight 901 crashed on Mount Erebus, killing all 257 people on board.

== Geology and volcanology ==
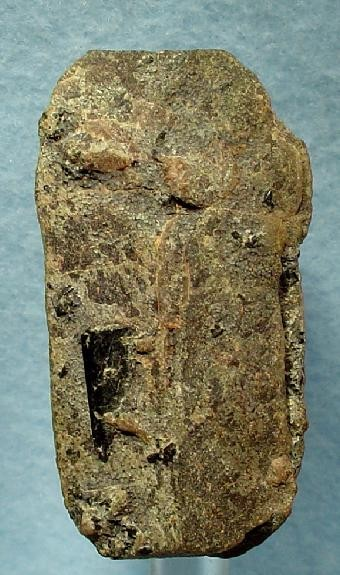
Anorthoclase crystal (45 mm long) from Mount Erebus

Mount Erebus is the world's southernmost active volcano. It is the current eruptive centre of the Erebus hotspot. The summit contains a persistent convecting phonolitic lava lake, one of five long-lasting lava lakes on Earth. Characteristic eruptive activity consists of Strombolian eruptions from the lava lake or from one of several subsidiary vents, all within the volcano's inner crater. The volcano is scientifically remarkable in that its relatively low-level and unusually persistent eruptive activity enables long-term volcanological study of a Strombolian eruptive system very close (hundreds of metres) to the active vents, a characteristic shared with only a few volcanoes on Earth, such as Stromboli in Italy. Scientific study of the volcano is also facilitated by its proximity to McMurdo Station (U.S.) and Scott Base (New Zealand), both sited on the same island around 35 km away.

Mount Erebus is classified as a polygenetic stratovolcano. The bottom half of the volcano is a shield and the top half is a stratocone. The composition of the current eruptive products of Erebus are anorthoclase-porphyritic tephritic phonolite and phonolite, which are the bulk of exposed lava flow on the volcano. The oldest eruptive products consist of relatively undifferentiated and nonviscous basanite lavas that form the low broad platform shield of Erebus. Slightly younger basanite and phonotephrite lavas crop out on Fang Ridge – an eroded remnant of an early Erebus volcano – and at other isolated locations on the flanks of Erebus. Erebus is the world's only presently erupting phonolite volcano.

Lava flows of more viscous phonotephrite and trachyte erupted after the basanite. The upper slopes of Mount Erebus are dominated by steeply dipping (about 30°) tephritic phonolite lava flows with large-scale flow levees. A conspicuous break in slope around 3,200 m ASL calls attention to a summit plateau representing a caldera. The summit caldera was created by an explosive VEI-6 eruption that occurred 18,000 ± 7,000 years ago. It is filled with small volume tephritic phonolite and phonolite lava flows. In the center of the summit caldera is a small, steep-sided cone composed primarily of decomposed lava bombs and a large deposit of anorthoclase crystals known as Erebus crystals. The active lava lake in this summit cone undergoes continuous degassing.

Microscopic gold particles have been found up to 1000 kilometres from Mount Erebus, ranging in size up to 60 micrometres. A 1991 paper shows that these particles condense from the volcano's emissions that include 80 grams of gold vapor daily. This amount of gold vapor is low compared to other volcanoes, but the condensation from vapor into gold particles is the first ever documented.

Researchers spent more than three months during the 2007–08 field season installing an atypically dense array of seismometers around Mount Erebus to listen to waves of energy generated by small, controlled blasts from explosives they buried along its flanks and perimeter, and to record scattered seismic signals generated by lava lake eruptions and local ice quakes. By studying the refracted and scattered seismic waves, the scientists produced an image of the uppermost (top few km) of the volcano to understand the geometry of its "plumbing" and how the magma rises to the lava lake. These results demonstrated a complex upper-volcano conduit system with appreciable upper-volcano magma storage to the northwest of the lava lake at depths hundreds of meters below the surface.

== Ice fumaroles ==
Mount Erebus is notable for its numerous ice fumaroles – ice towers that form around gases that escape from vents in the surface. The ice caves associated with the fumaroles are dark, in polar alpine environments starved in organics and with oxygenated hydrothermal circulation in highly reducing host rock. The life is sparse, mainly bacteria and fungi. This makes it of special interest for studying oligotrophs – organisms that can survive on minimal amounts of resources.

The caves on Erebus are of special interest for astrobiology, as most surface caves are influenced by human activities, or by organics from the surface brought in by animals (e.g. bats and birds) or ground water. The caves at Erebus are at high altitude, yet accessible for study. Some of the caves can reach temperatures of 25 degrees Celsius (77 degrees Fahrenheit), and with light near the cave mouths, in some caves covered by thin overlying ice, the light may reach even deeper and is sufficient to sustain an ecosystem of flora and fauna consisting of moss, algae, arthropods and nematodes.

They are dynamic systems that collapse and rebuild, but persist over decades. The air inside the caves has 80 to 100% humidity, and up to 3% carbon dioxide (CO_{2}), and some carbon monoxide (CO) and hydrogen (H_{2}), but almost no methane (CH_{4}) or hydrogen sulfide (H_{2}S). Many of them are completely dark, so cannot support photosynthesis. Organics can only come from the atmosphere, or from ice algae that grow on the surface in summer, which may eventually find their way into the caves through burial and melting. As a result, most micro-organisms there are chemolithoautotrophic i.e. microbes that get all of their energy from chemical reactions with the rocks, and that do not depend on any other lifeforms to survive. The organisms survive using CO_{2} fixation and some may use CO oxidization for the metabolism. The main types of microbe found there are Chloroflexota and Acidobacteriota. In 2019, the Marsden Fund granted nearly NZ$1 million to the University of Waikato and the University of Canterbury to study the micro-organisms in the geothermal fumaroles.

== History ==
=== Discovery and naming ===
Mount Erebus was discovered on 27 January 1841 (and observed to be in eruption), by polar explorer Sir James Clark Ross on his Antarctic expedition, who named it and its companion, Mount Terror, after his ships, HMS Erebus and HMS Terror (which were later used and lost by Sir John Franklin on his disastrous Arctic expedition). Present with Ross on HMS Erebus was the young Joseph Hooker, future president of the Royal Society and close friend of Charles Darwin. Erebus is a dark region in Hades in Greek mythology, personified as the Ancient Greek primordial deity of darkness, the son of Chaos.

=== Historic sites ===
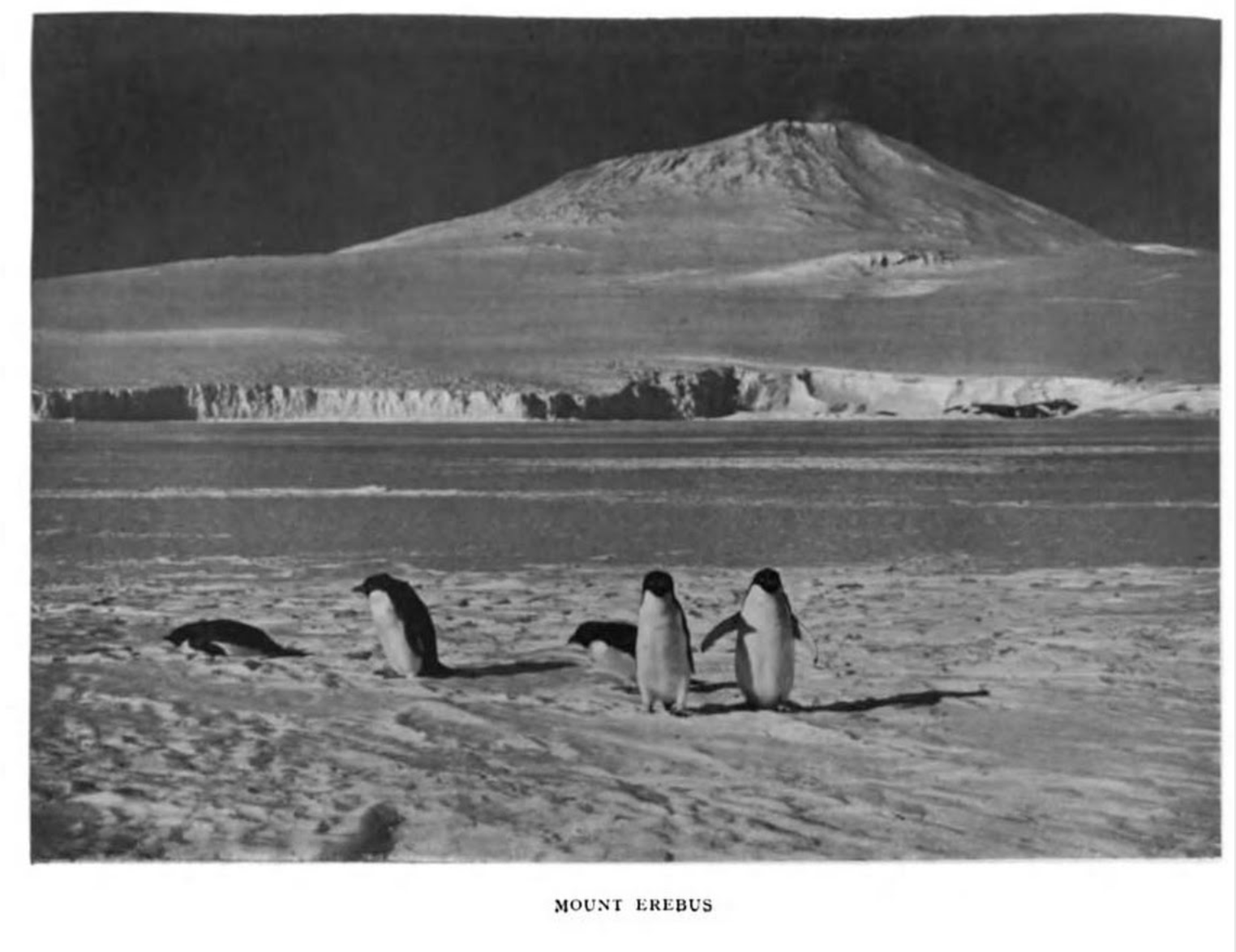
Photograph of Mount Erebus (and Adélie penguins) taken by the Terra Nova expedition in 1913

The mountain was surveyed in December 1912 by a science party from Robert Falcon Scott's Terra Nova expedition, who also collected geological samples. Two of the camp sites they used have been recognised for their historic significance:

- Upper “Summit Camp” site (HSM 89) consists of part of a circle of rocks, which were probably used to weight the tent valances.
- Lower “Camp E” site (HSM 90) consists of a slightly elevated area of gravel, as well as some aligned rocks, which may have been used to weight the tent valances.

They have been designated historic sites or monuments following a proposal by the United Kingdom, New Zealand, and the United States to the Antarctic Treaty Consultative Meeting.

=== Climbing ===
Mount Erebus's summit crater rim was first achieved by members of Sir Ernest Shackleton's party; Professor Edgeworth David, Sir Douglas Mawson, Dr Alister Mackay, Alex Lagasse, Jameson Adams, Dr Eric Marshall and Philip Brocklehurst (who did not reach the summit), on 10 March 1908. The ascent was documented in the first chapter of Aurora Australis, the first book to be written and published in Antarctica. Its first known solo ascent and the first winter ascent was accomplished by British mountaineer Roger Mear on 7 June 1985, a member of the "In the Footsteps of Scott" expedition. On 19–20 January 1991, Charles J. Blackmer, an iron-worker for many years at McMurdo Station and the South Pole, accomplished a solo ascent in about 17 hours completely unsupported, by snow mobile and on foot. In 2026, British explorer Scott Pallett and Australian explorer Bill Kwok summitted after sled-hauling from Cape Evans, having travelled across the Southern Ocean aboard the vessel Scenic Eclipse II. The duo approached the summit crater via the north-west face during a scientific expedition to conduct genomic biosurveillance. Four days later, Pallett re-ascended to the summit crater solo via a different route.

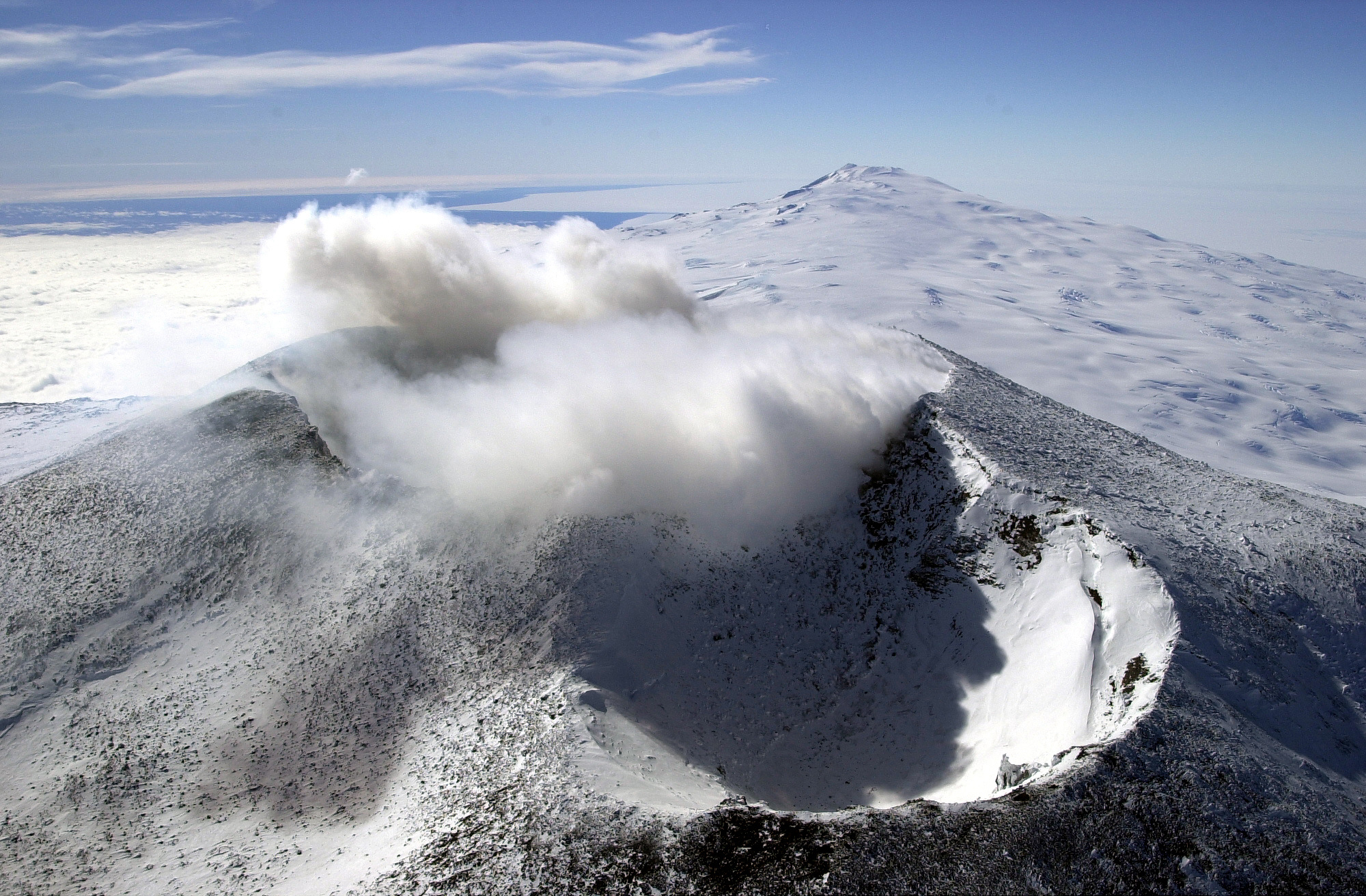
Aerial view of Mount Erebus craters

=== Robotic exploration ===
In 1992, the inside of the volcano was explored by Dante I, an eight legged tethered robotic explorer. Dante was designed to acquire gas samples from the magma lake inside the inner crater of Mount Erebus to understand the chemistry better through the use of the on-board gas chromatograph, as well as measuring the temperature inside the volcano and the radioactivity of the materials present in such volcanoes. Dante successfully scaled a significant portion of the crater before technical difficulties emerged with the fibre-optic cable used for communications between the walker and base station. Since Dante had not yet reached the bottom of the crater, no data of volcanic significance was recorded. The expedition proved to be highly successful in terms of robotic and computer science, and was possibly the first expedition by a robotic platform to Antarctica.

=== Air New Zealand Flight 901 ===
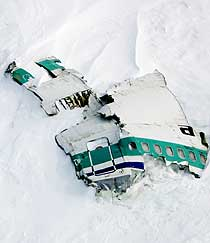
Wreckage of Flight 901

Air New Zealand Flight 901 was a scheduled sightseeing service from Auckland Airport in New Zealand to Antarctica and return with a scheduled stop at Christchurch Airport to refuel before returning to Auckland. The Air New Zealand flyover service, for the purposes of Antarctic sightseeing, was operated with McDonnell Douglas DC-10-30 aircraft and began in February 1977. The flight crashed into Mount Erebus on 28 November 1979, killing all 257 people on board. Passenger photographs taken seconds before the collision ruled out the "flying in a cloud" theory, showing perfectly clear visibility well beneath the cloud base, with landmarks visible 21 kilometres (13 mi) to the left and 16 kilometres (9.9 mi) to the right of the aircraft. The mountain directly ahead was lit by sunlight shining from directly behind the aircraft through the cloud deck above, resulting in a lack of shadows that made Mount Erebus effectively invisible against the overcast sky beyond in a classic whiteout (more accurately, "flat-light") phenomenon. Further investigation of the crash showed a navigational error in flight documentation by Air New Zealand and a cover-up that resulted in about $100 million in lawsuits. Air New Zealand discontinued its flyovers of Antarctica. Its final flight was on 17 February 1980. During the Antarctic summer, snow melt on the flanks of Mount Erebus continually reveals debris from the crash that is visible from the air.

== Craters ==
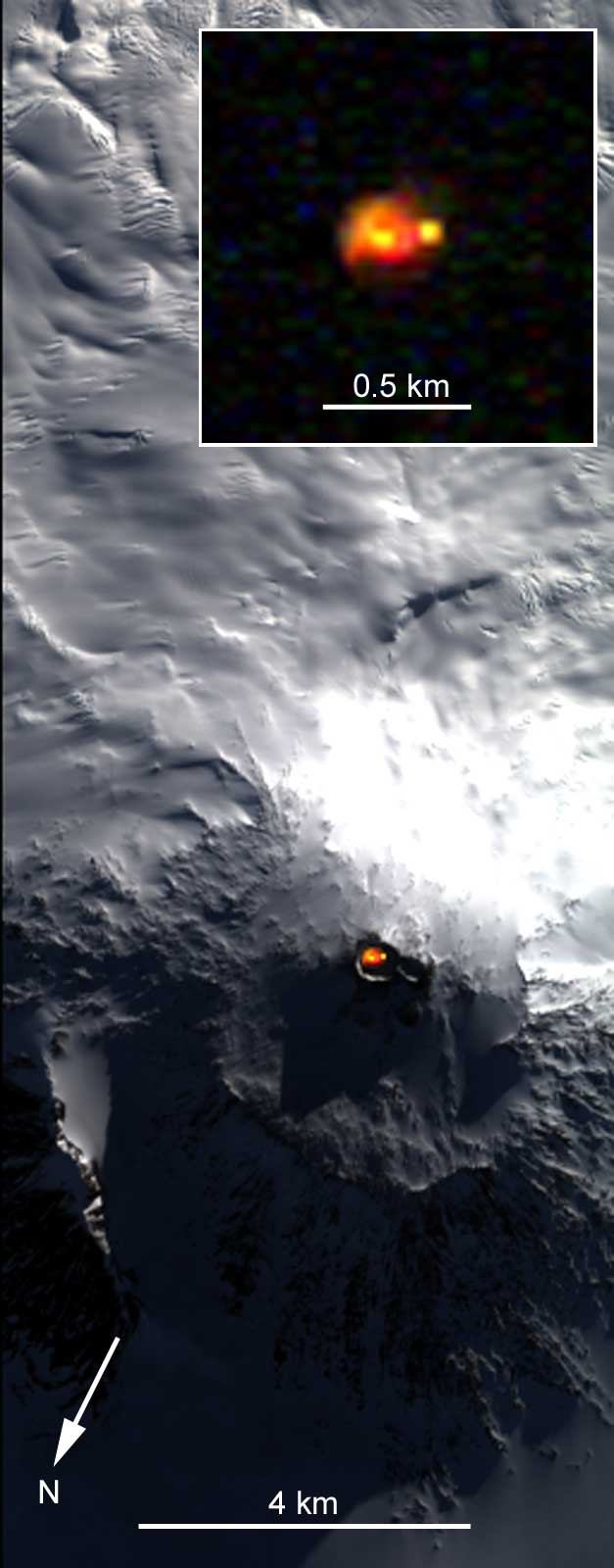
Satellite picture of Mount Erebus showing glow from its persistent lava lake

=== Main Crater ===
77.5287°S 167.1598°E. The topographic feature that rises to about 3,750 metres (12,300 ft) high and forms the primary summit crater of Mount Erebus. Inner Crater, which lies within Main Crater, contains an anorthoclase-phonolite lava lake.

=== Inner Crater ===
77.5270°S 167.1652°E. The topographic feature that embraces the crater within the floor of Main Crater, at the summit of Mount Erebus. Inner Crater contains an active anorthoclase-phonolite lava lake. The name derives from the fact that the crater is within the Main Crater of Mount Erebus.

=== Side Crater ===
77.5296°S 167.1433°E A nearly circular crater, about 3,700 metres (12,100 ft) high, situated at the summit of Mount Erebus on the southwest crater rim. Named for its location on the side of the main summit cone of Mount Erebus.

=== Western Crater ===
77.5323°S 167.1193°E A small circular crater at 3,561 metres (11,683 ft) high on the western slope of the summit of Mount Erebus. So named for its location.

== Summit features ==
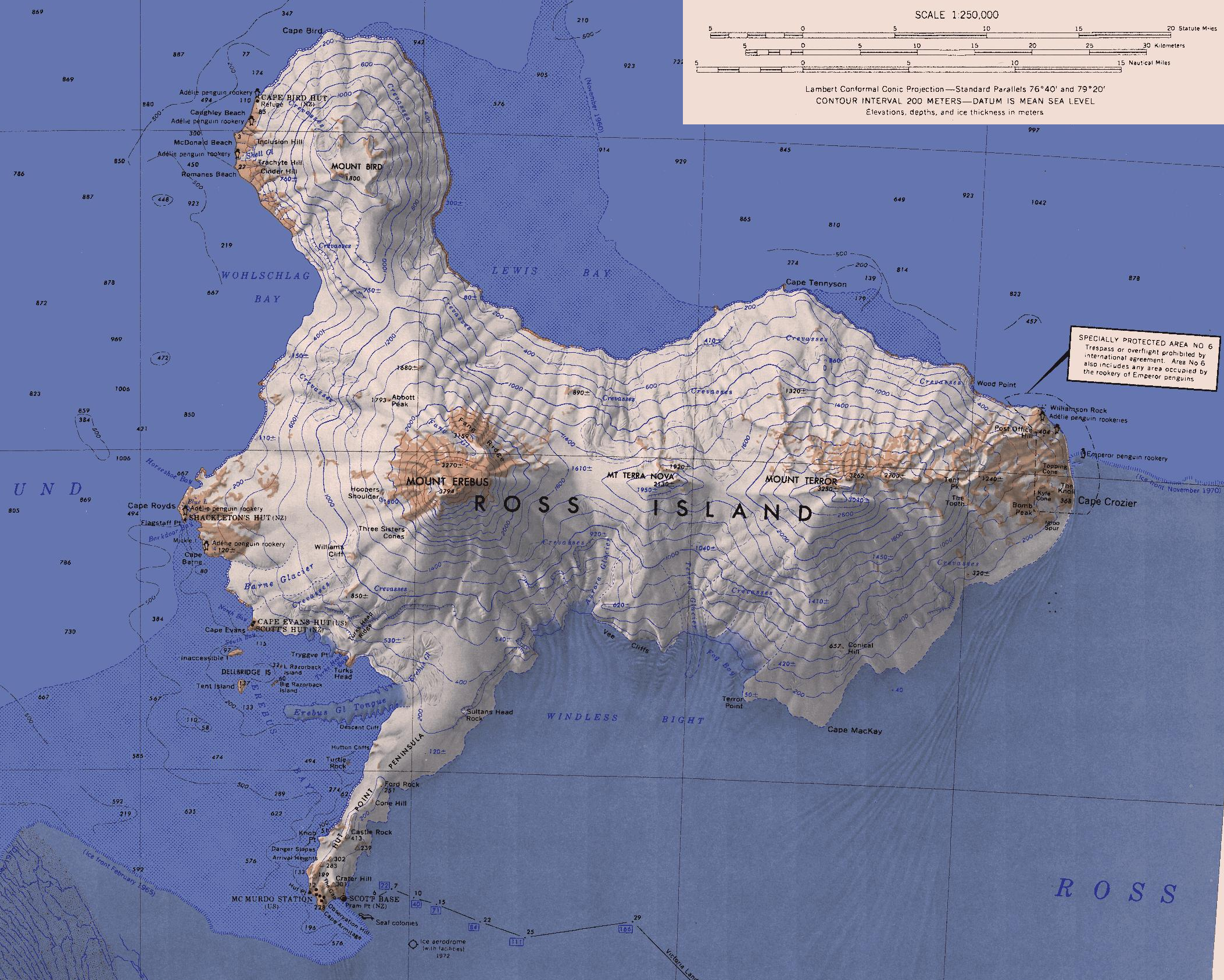
Mount Erebus is in the west center

Mount Erebus has several named features on its slopes, including a number of rock formations. Features around the summit of the mountain include:

=== Helo Cliffs ===
77.5035°S 167.1169°E. Prominent cliffs at about 3,525 metres (11,565 ft) high on the north rim of the summit caldera of Mount Erebus. The name derives from a nearby United States Coast Guard (USCG) HH-52A helicopter (CG 1404) which lost power and crashed while enroute from McMurdo Station to Cape Bird, Jan. 9, 1971. The four crew and passengers were not injured, but the helicopter was abandoned because of its location.

=== Seismic Bluff ===
77.5315°S 167.0796°E Steep bluff at about 3,470 metres (11,380 ft) high on the southwest rim of the summit caldera of Mount Erebus. So named after a seismic station nearby.

=== Tower Ridge ===
77.5326°S 167.1126°E. A ridge at about 3,540 metres (11,610 ft) high that descends the southwest slope of the summit crater of Mount Erebus. So named because the ridge is defined by a series of fumarolic ice towers.

=== Camp Slope ===
77.5282°S 167.1464°E. A concave slope, about 3,650 metres (11,980 ft) high, just south of Crystal Slope on the west side of the summit cone of Mount Erebus. The feature is the site of a slump which has occurred off the crater rim. It is also a former camp site used by summit parties. A small hut is located on the upper part of the slope.

=== Robot Gully ===
77.5268°S 167.1457°E. A gully at about 3,675 metres (12,057 ft) high on the northwest side of the summit crater of Mount Erebus. The feature was used as the access route from a NASA robot called Dante that was carried to the crater rim, Jan. 1, 1993.

=== Crystal Slope ===
77.5256°S 167.1502°E. A western slope, 3,700 metres (12,100 ft) high, between Camp Slope and Robot Gully, leading down from the summit crater rim of Mount Erebus. So named because the slope includes a talus of large anorthoclase feldspar crystals.

=== Nausea Knob ===
77.5211°S 167.1469°E A prominent outcropping of jumbled rocks, 3,633 metres (11,919 ft) high, formed as a lava flow on the northwest upper slope of the active cone of Mount Erebus. The feature is near a camp site used mainly in the 1970s by teams working at the summit of the volcano. So named because many working at the camp suffered from nausea due to high elevation mountain sickness.

== Northern features ==
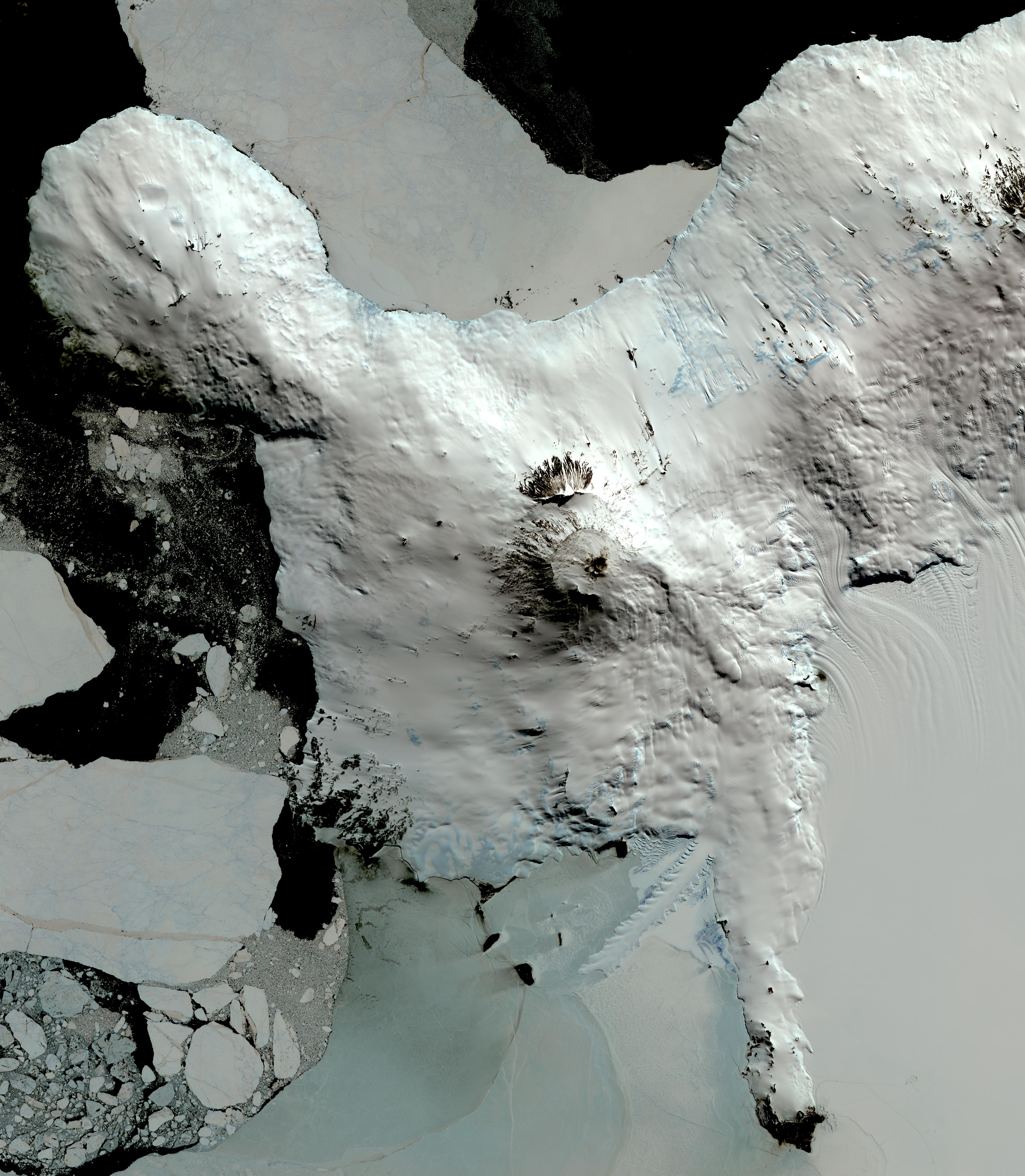
Mt Erebus, Antarctica

Features on the northern slopes include:

=== Abbott Peak ===
77°26′S 167°00′E. Pyramidal peak on the north side of Mount Erebus, between it and Mount Bird. Charted by the British Antarctic Expedition under Scott, 1910-13, and named for Petty Officer George P. Abbott, Royal Navy, a member of the expedition.

=== Krall Crags ===
77.4540°S 166.8158°E. Two rock summits rising to over 1,400 metres (4,600 ft) high on the northwest slope of Mount Erebus. The feature is 1.2 nautical miles (2.2 km; 1.4 mi) west-northwest of Abbott Peak. At the suggestion of P.R. Kyle, named by Advisory Committee on Antarctic Names (US-ACAN) (2000) after Sarah Krall who worked over 10 years in providing support to science in Antarctica. She was cook and camp manager at the lower Erebus Hut during the 1992-93 NSF-NASA Dante robot experiment on Mount Erebus. She also managed the food room at McMurdo Station, was the hovercraft pilot, and has also been a helicopter technician.

=== Tarr Nunatak ===
77.4780°S 166.8882°E A nunatak rising to about 1,700 metres (5,600 ft) high on the northwest slope of Mount Erebus. The feature is 1.2 nautical miles (2.2 km; 1.4 mi) south-southwest of Abbott Peak. Named by New Zealand Geographic Board (NZGB) (2000) after Sergeant L.W. (Wally) Tarr, Royal New Zealand Air Force, aircraft mechanic with the New Zealand contingent of the Commonwealth Trans-Antarctic Expedition (CTAE), 1956-58.

=== Fang Ridge ===
77°29′S 167°12′E. A conspicuous ridge on the northeast slope of Mount Erebus. It is a much denuded portion of the original caldera rim left by a catastrophic eruption. So named, probably for its curved shape, by Frank Debenham of the British Antarctic Expedition, 1910–13, who made a plane table survey in 1912.

=== The Fang ===
77.4859°S 167.2036°E. A distinctive toothlike peak, 3,159 metres (10,364 ft) high, which forms the highest point of Fang Ridge. Descriptively named by Frank Debenham of British Antarctic Expedition (British Antarctic Expedition), 1910–13, who made a plane table survey of the vicinity in 1912.

=== Millennium Peak ===
77.5066°S 167.3818°E. A peak rising to about 1,800 metres (5,900 ft) high on the northeast slope of Mount Erebus, 4 nautical miles (7.4 km; 4.6 mi) east-northeast of the Erebus summit. So named by Advisory Committee on Antarctic Names (US-ACAN) in the millennium year 2000.

=== Coleman Peak ===
77.4881°S 167.4774°E. A peak rising to about 1,600 metres (5,200 ft) high on the northeast slope of Mount Erebus, 3.6 nautical miles (6.7 km; 4.1 mi) east of the summit of Fang Ridge. Named by the New Zealand Geographic Board (NZGB) (2000) after Father Coleman, a New Zealand chaplain, who traveled to Antarctica many times with the United States Antarctic Program.

=== Te Puna Roimata Peak ===
77.4474°S 167.5615°E. A peak about 890 metres (2,920 ft) high, located 1.5 nautical miles (2.8 km; 1.7 mi) west of Terra Nova Glacier and 2 nautical miles (3.7 km; 2.3 mi) south of Lewis Bay on the lower northeast slope of Mount Erebus. On November 28, 1979, an Air New Zealand McDonnell Douglas DC-10 aircraft on a scenic flight from Auckland crashed near this peak claiming the lives of 237 passengers from eight countries and a crew of 20. In 1987, a stainless steel memorial cross was erected west of the peak. Te Puna Roimata Peak (meaning spring of tears) was named by the New Zealand Geographic Board (NZGB) in 2000.

== Southern features ==
Features of the southern slopes of the mountain include:

=== Hoopers Shoulder ===
77°32′S 166°53′E. An independent cone at an elevation of 1,800 metres (5,900 ft) high on the west slopes of Mount Erebus. From McMurdo Sound it appears as a perfect pyramid of black rock, standing out as a splendid mark against the background of the ice and almost on a line from Cape Royds to the crater of Mount Erebus. The cone itself is about 100 metres (330 ft) high and is surrounded by a deep moat or ditch, caused by the sweeping action of strong winds. It was named by F. Debenham on the second ascent of Mount Erebus for F.J. Hooper, a steward of the British Antarctic Expedition, 1910-13. Hooper was one of the party making the second ascent.

=== Cashman Crags ===
77.5405°S 166.8504°E Two rock summits at about 1,500 metres (4,900 ft) high on the west slope of Mount Erebus. The feature is 0.6 nautical miles (1.1 km; 0.69 mi) southwest of Hoopers Shoulder. At the suggestion of P.R. Kyle, named by United States Advisory Committee on Antarctic Names (US-ACAN) (2000) after Katherine V. Cashman, United States Antarctic Research Program (USARP) team member on Mount Erebus in 1978-79 while a Fulbright scholar at Victoria University of Wellington; worked again on Mount Erebus, 1988–89; later Professor of Geology, University of Oregon.

=== Williams Cliff ===
77°35′S 166°47′E. A prominent rock cliff that stands out from the ice-covered southwest slopes of Mount Erebus, situated 6 nautical miles (11 km; 6.9 mi) east of Cape Barne. This rock cliff was mapped by the British Antarctic Expedition under Scott, 1910–13, and identified simply as "Bold Cliff on maps resulting from that expedition. It was named Williams Cliff by the US-ACAN in 1964 to commemorate Richard T. Williams, who lost his life when his tractor broke through the ice at McMurdo Sound in January 1956.

=== Tech Crags ===
77.6135°S 166.7673°E. A narrow broken ridge 2 nautical miles (3.7 km; 2.3 mi) south of Williams Cliff on Ross Island. The feature rises to about 1,000 metres (3,300 ft) high and marks a declivity along the north flank of broad Turks Head Ridge, from which ice moves to Pukaru Icefalls. Named by US-ACAN (2000) after the New Mexico Institute of Mining and Technology, known as New Mexico Tech. From 1981, many Tech students under the direction of Philip R. Kyle, have undertaken graduate research projects (thesis and dissertation) on Mount Erebus.

=== Three Sisters Cones ===
77°34′S 166°58′E. Three aligned cones at an elevation of about 1,800 metres (5,900 ft) high on the southwest slopes of Mount Erebus. Named by members of the British Antarctic Expedition, 1910–13, under Scott.

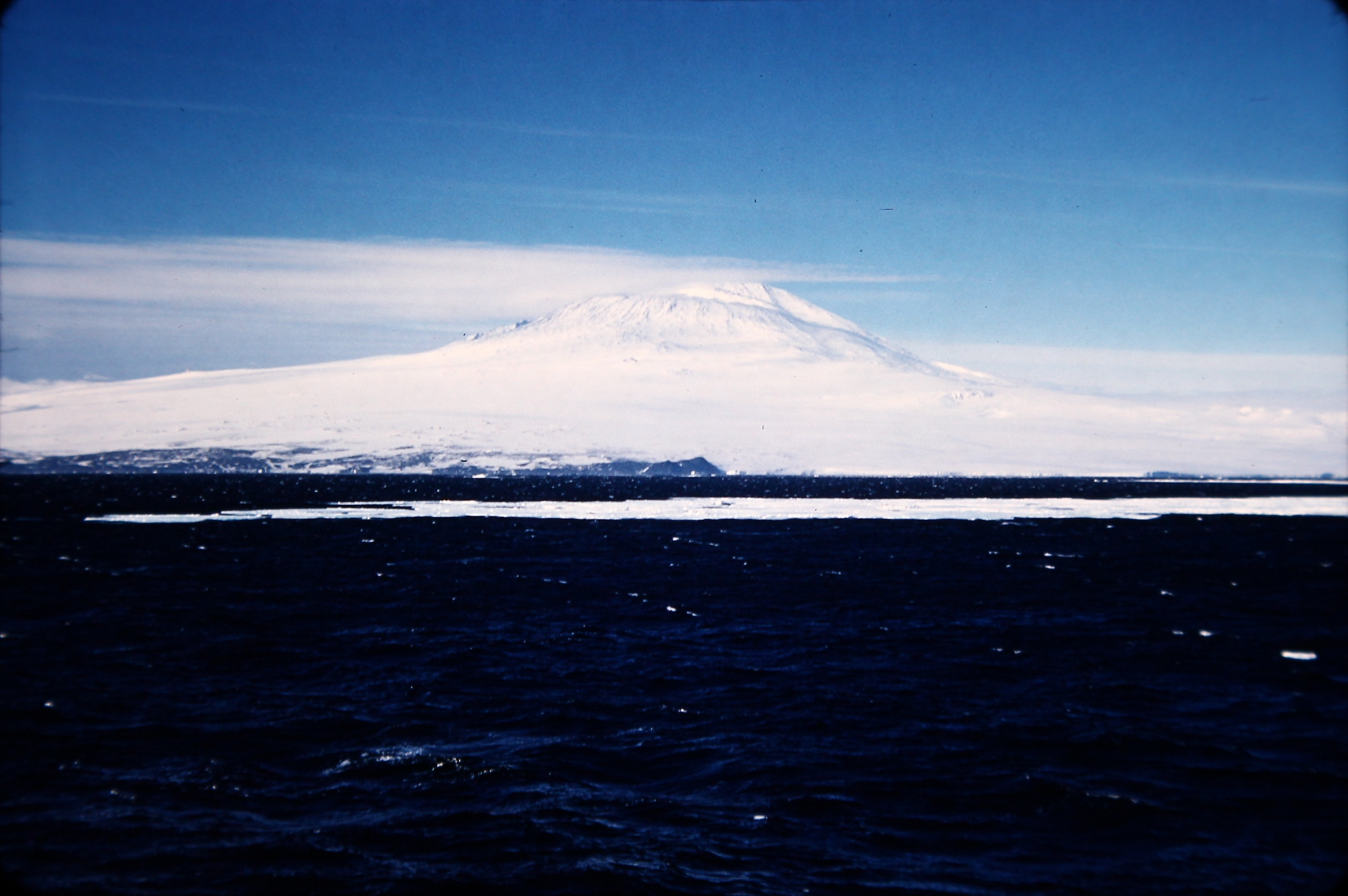
Mount Erebus in December 1955

=== Turks Head Ridge ===
77°38′S 166°49′E. A mostly ice-covered ridge extending from Turks Head for a few miles up the slopes of Mount Erebus. Mapped by the British Antarctic Expedition, 1910–13, under Scott and so named because of its association with Turks Head.

=== Esser Bluff ===
77.6388°S 166.908°E. A rock bluff rising to about 600 metres (2,000 ft) high on the southeast margin of Turks Head Ridge. The bluff is 1.1 nautical miles (2.0 km; 1.3 mi) east-northeast of Grazyna Bluff. At the suggestion of P.R. Kyle, named by US-ACAN (2000) after Richard Esser, a member of New Mexico Tech field parties on Mount Erebus in the 1993–94 and 1994-95 seasons; later a technician in the New Mexico Geochronology Lab at NM Tech, where he has dated many rocks from Antarctica.

=== Grazyna Bluff ===
77.6428°S 166.8232°E. A rock bluff rising to about 600 metres (2,000 ft) high in the south part of Turks Head Ridge. The bluff is 1.5 nautical miles (2.8 km; 1.7 mi) north-northeast of Turks Head. At the suggestion of P.R. Kyle, named by US-ACAN (2000) after Grazyna Zreda-Gostynska, who worked on Mount Erebus in 1989-90 as a member of the New Mexico Institute of Mining and Technology team. A Ph.D. student at NMIMT, she completed her doctoral dissertation on the gas emissions from Mount Erebus.

=== Glacier Ridge ===
77.5940°S 167.2763°E. A broad north–south ridge, 4.5 nautical miles (8.3 km; 5.2 mi) long and 0.8 nautical miles (1.5 km; 0.92 mi) wide, on the south slopes of Mount Erebus. Completely ice covered, the ridge descends from about 2,200 metres (7,200 ft) high to 600 metres (2,000 ft) high, terminating 2.1 nautical miles (3.9 km; 2.4 mi) northwest of Tyree Head. In association with the names of expedition ships grouped on this island, named after United States Coast Guard Cutter (USCGC) Glacier, an icebreaker which for three decades, 1955-56 to 1986-87, supported scientific activity in Antarctica and Ross Sea on virtually an annual basis. From 1955-56, Glacier operated as a US Navy ship. Along with other Navy icebreakers, Glacier was transferred to the US Coast Guard fleet, June 1966, from which she operated until decommissioned, June 1987.

== Glaciers ==
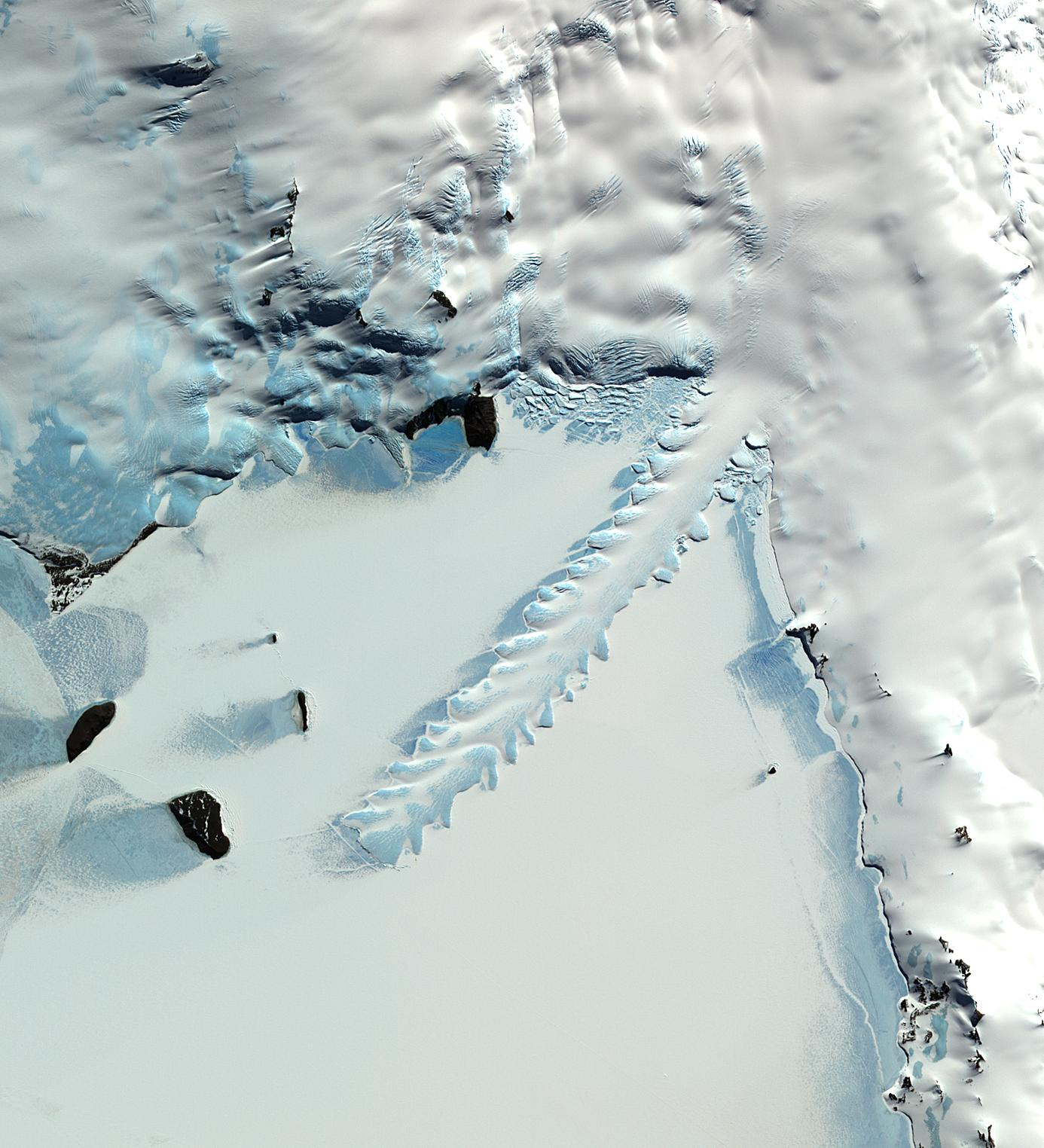
Erebus Glacier Tongue

=== Fang Glacier ===
77°29′S 167°06′E. A glacier on the west side of Fang Ridge, separating the old and new craters of Mount Erebus. Charted by Frank Debenham of the BrAE, 1910–13, and named by him in association with Fang Ridge.

=== Erebus Glacier ===
77°41′S 167°00′E. A glacier draining the lower south slopes of Mount Erebus, Ross Island, and flowing west to Erebus Bay where it forms the floating Erebus Glacier Tongue. Named in association with Mount Erebus by the British National Antarctic Expedition (BrNAE), 1901–04, under Scott.

=== Erebus Glacier Tongue ===
77°42′S 166°40′E. The seaward extension of Erebus Glacier from Ross Island, projecting into Erebus Bay where part of it is floating. Charted and named by the BrNAE under Scott, 1901-04.

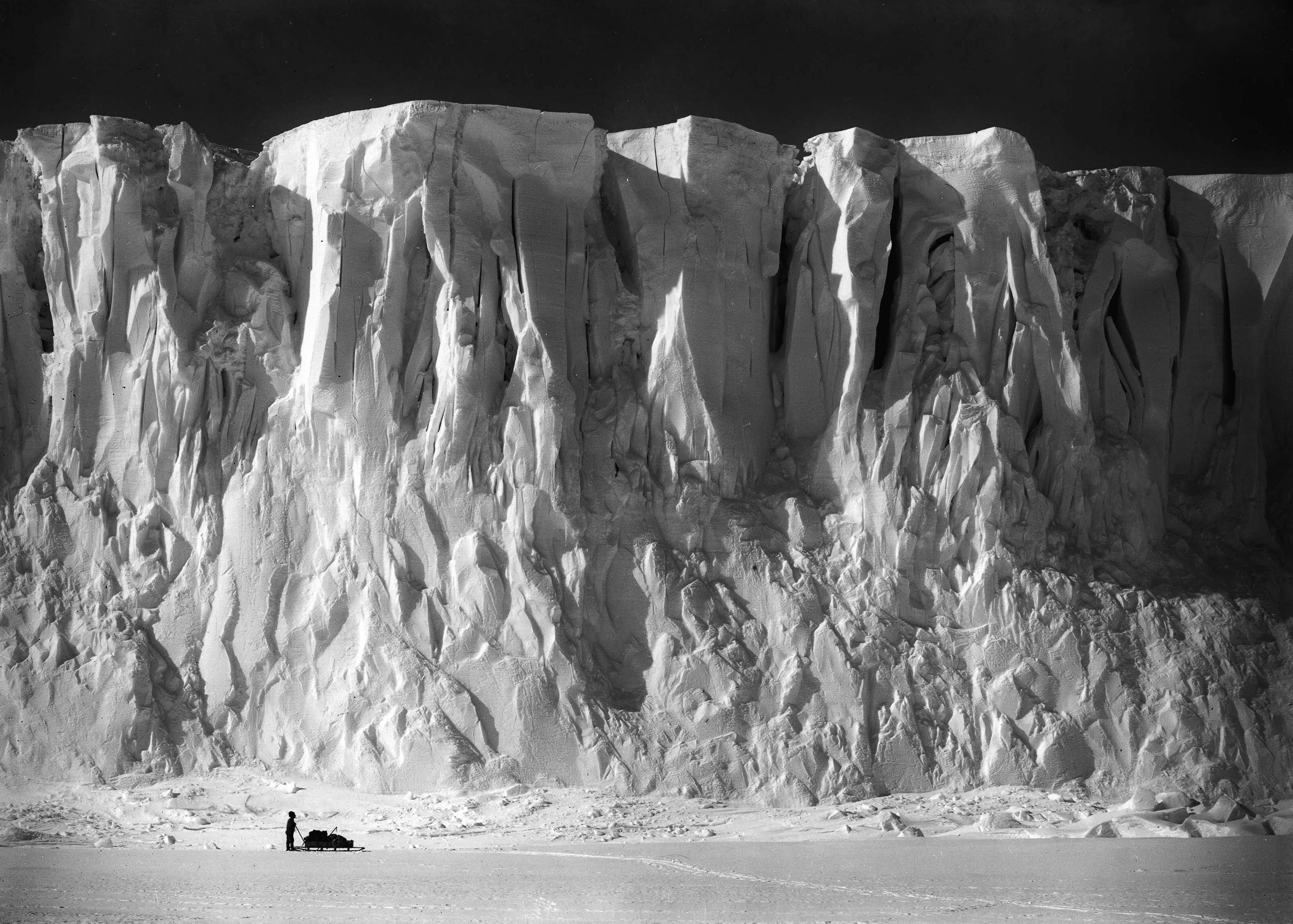
Barne Glacier around 1910

=== Barne Glacier ===
77°36′S 166°26′E. Steep glacier which descends from the west slopes of Mount Erebus and terminates on the west side of Ross Island between Cape Barne and Cape Evans where it forms a steep ice cliff. Discovered by the BrNAE, 1901–04, under Scott. Named by the British Antarctic Expedition, 1907–09, under Shackleton after nearby Cape Barne.

== See also ==
- List of volcanoes in Antarctica
- Lower Erebus Hut – home of MEVO

== Sources ==
- Alberts, Fred G., ed. (1995), Geographic Names of the Antarctic (PDF) (2 ed.), United States Board on Geographic Names This article incorporates public domain material from websites or documents of the United States Board on Geographic Names.
- "Camp Slope", Geographic Names Information System, United States Geological Survey, United States Department of the Interior
- "Cashman Crags", Geographic Names Information System, United States Geological Survey, United States Department of the Interior
- "Coleman Peak", Geographic Names Information System, United States Geological Survey, United States Department of the Interior
- "Crystal Slope", Geographic Names Information System, United States Geological Survey, United States Department of the Interior
- "Esser Bluff", Geographic Names Information System, United States Geological Survey, United States Department of the Interior
- "Glacier Ridge", Geographic Names Information System, United States Geological Survey, United States Department of the Interior
- "Grazyna Bluff", Geographic Names Information System, United States Geological Survey, United States Department of the Interior
- "Helo Cliffs", Geographic Names Information System, United States Geological Survey, United States Department of the Interior
- "Inner Crater", Geographic Names Information System, United States Geological Survey, United States Department of the Interior
- "Krall Crags", Geographic Names Information System, United States Geological Survey, United States Department of the Interior
- "Main Crater", Geographic Names Information System, United States Geological Survey, United States Department of the Interior
- "Millennium Peak", Geographic Names Information System, United States Geological Survey, United States Department of the Interior
- "Mount Erebus". Global Volcanism Program. Smithsonian Institution.
- "Nausea Knob", Geographic Names Information System, United States Geological Survey, United States Department of the Interior
- "Robot Gully", Geographic Names Information System, United States Geological Survey, United States Department of the Interior
- Ross Island, USGS: United States Geological Survey
- "Seismic Bluff", Geographic Names Information System, United States Geological Survey, United States Department of the Interior
- "Side Crater", Geographic Names Information System, United States Geological Survey, United States Department of the Interior
- "Tarr Nunatak", Geographic Names Information System, United States Geological Survey, United States Department of the Interior
- "Te Puna Roimata Peak", Geographic Names Information System, United States Geological Survey, United States Department of the Interior
- "Tech Crags", Geographic Names Information System, United States Geological Survey, United States Department of the Interior
- "The Fang", Geographic Names Information System, United States Geological Survey, United States Department of the Interior
- "Tower Ridge", Geographic Names Information System, United States Geological Survey, United States Department of the Interior
- "Western Crater", Geographic Names Information System, United States Geological Survey, United States Department of the Interior

This article incorporates public domain material from websites or documents of the United States Geological Survey.
