= Buddingtonite =

Ammonium feldspar mineral

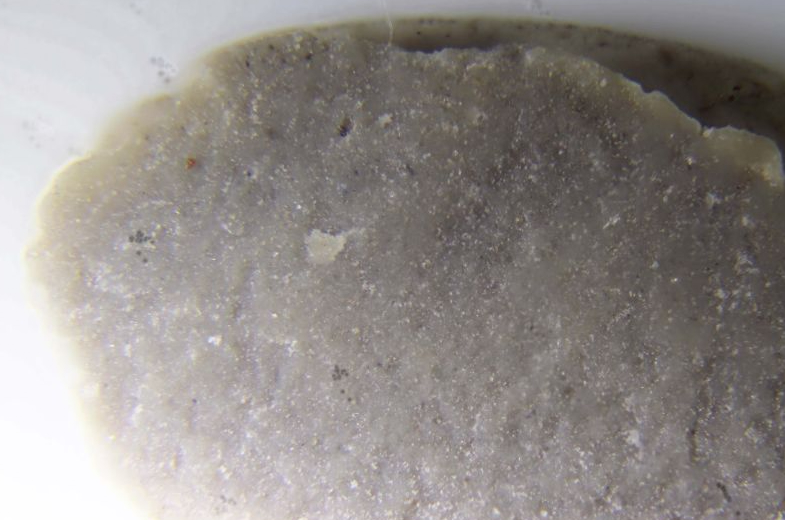

General
- Category: Tectosilicate minerals
- Group: Feldspar group
- Formula: NH_{4}AlSi_{3}O_{8}
- IMA symbol: Bud
- IMA status: Approved (1964)
- Strunz classification: 9.FA.30
- Dana classification: 76.1.2.1
- Crystal system: Monoclinic
- Crystal class: Prismatic (2) or sphenoidal (2/m)
- Space group: P2_{1} (no. 4) or C2/m (no. 12)
- Unit cell: a = 8.57 Å, b = 13.03 Å, c = 7.18 Å; β = 112.73°; Z = 4

Identification
- Color: Colorless
- Crystal habit: Compact masses replacing plagioclase as pseudomorphs
- Cleavage: Good on {001}, distinct on {010}
- Tenacity: Brittle
- Mohs scale hardness: 5.5
- Luster: Vitreous
- Streak: Light grey to yellow (impure specimens)
- Diaphaneity: Transparent to translucent
- Specific gravity: 2.32
- Optical properties: Biaxial (+)
- Refractive index: n_{α} = 1.530 n_{β} = 1.531 n_{γ} = 1.534
- Birefringence: δ = 0.004
- 2V angle: Calculated: 60°

Buddingtonite is an ammonium feldspar with formula: NH_{4}AlSi_{3}O_{8} (note: some sources add 0.5H_{2}O to the formula). It forms by hydrothermal alteration of primary feldspar minerals. It is an indicator of possible gold and silver deposits, as they can become concentrated by hydrothermal processes. It crystallizes in the monoclinic crystal system and is colorless to white with a vitreous luster. Its structure is analogous to that of high sanidine (KAlSi_{3}O_{8}). Buddingtonite has a hardness of 5.5 and a specific gravity of 2.32.

Buddingtonite was discovered in 1964 at the Sulfur Bank mine near Clear Lake in Lake County, California. Clear Lake is at the north end of The Geysers geothermal area. It also occurs in the Tonopah, Nevada area and in hydrothermal areas in New Zealand and Japan. It has also been reported from the sedimentary Phosphoria Formation in Idaho, South Dakota, Wyoming, and Montana. It occurs in the oil shale deposit, near Proserpine, Queensland, Australia.

It was named for Arthur Francis Buddington (1890–1980), a petrologist at Princeton University.

== Other reading ==
- Voncken JHL, van Roermund HLM, van der Eerden AMJ, Jansen JBH, Erd RC (1993). "Holotype buddingtonite, an ammonium feldspar without zeolitic H_{2}O". American Mineralogist. 78: 204–209.
- Voncken JHL, Konings RJM, Jansen JBH, Woensdregt CF (1988). "Hydrothermally grown buddingtonite, an anhydrous ammonium feldspar (NH_{4}AlSi_{3}O_{8})". Physics and Chemistry of Minerals. 15 (4): 323–328. Bibcode:1988PCM....15..323V. doi:10.1007/BF00311036. S2CID 93352487.
