= Lower Erebus Hut =

- Antarctic base
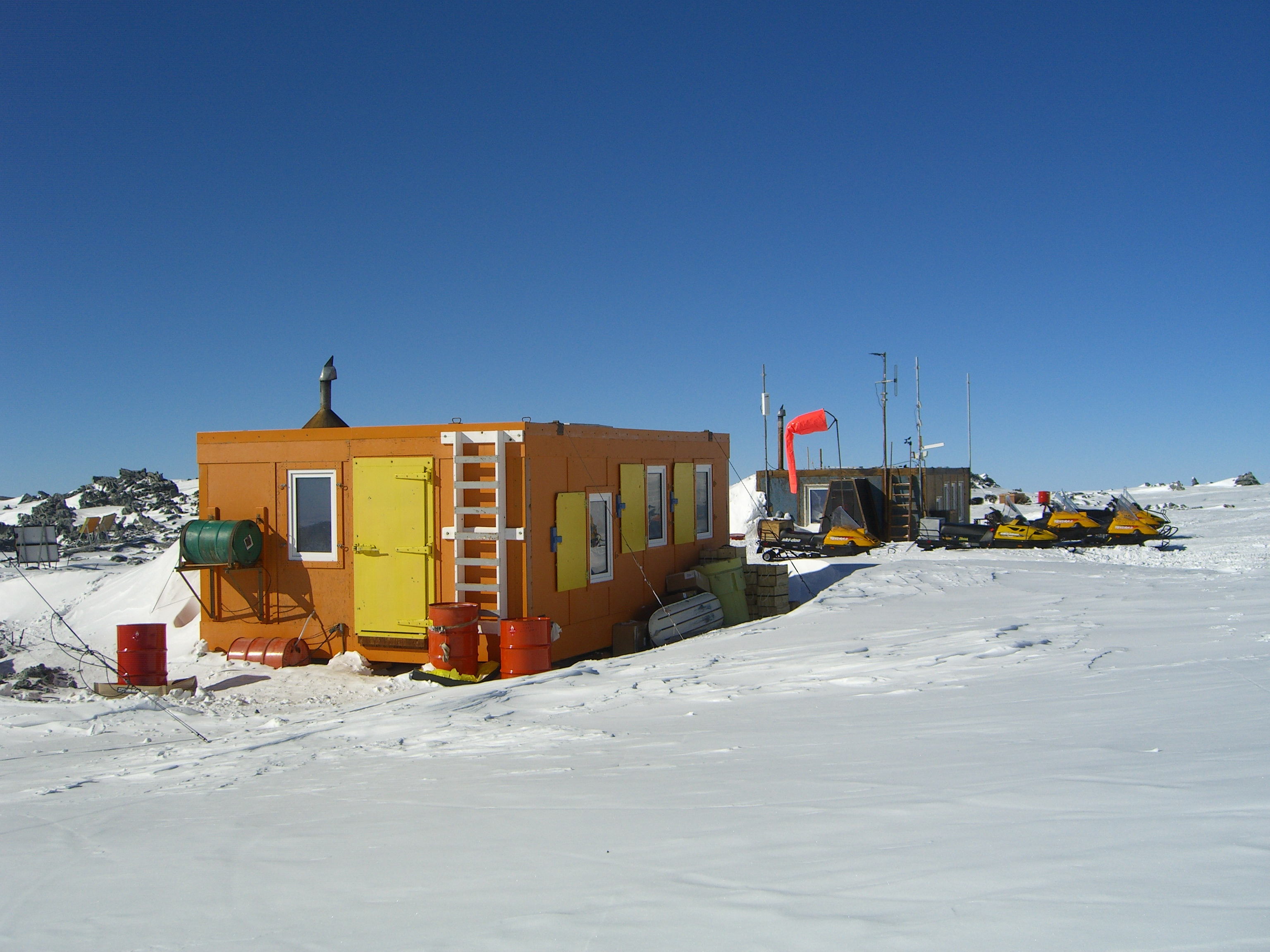
- Lower Erebus Hut in 2005

- Location of Lower Erebus Hut in Antarctica
- Coordinates: 77°30′41″S 167°08′34″E
- Country: United States
- Location in Antarctica: Mount Erebus; Ross Island; Antarctica
- Administered by: United States Antarctic Program
- Established: 1992
- Elevation: 11,161 ft (3,402 m)
- Type: Seasonal
- Period: Summer
- Status: Operational

The Lower Erebus Hut (LEH) is a permanent field facility located on Mount Erebus on Ross Island, Antarctica. The hut served as the seasonal base of the Mount Erebus Volcano Observatory (MEVO), run by New Mexico Institute of Mining and Technology (NMT). The installation comprises two huts, one kitchen and recreation building and one working and storage building.

The site supports studies of Mount Erebus, an active volcano with an exposed lava lake, and formations created by it such as ice caves.

== History ==
The permanent LEH was built in November 1992 as a replacement for the Upper hut and other semi-permanent Jamesway huts.

In the 2010s, the facility was used to test the PUFFER robot for exploration of Erebus's ice caves.

== Location ==
LEH is located on the northern side of Mount Erebus within its caldera rim. The location facilitates trips to the crater rim where the volcano's persistent lava lake is visible.

The Hut is at over 11,000 feet altitude, and supplies can be brought in by helicopter.

== Science ==
Major support for all operations at LEH are conducted through McMurdo Station run by a division of NSF, the United States Antarctic Program (USAP).

LEH is used as a base of operations for the monitoring of Mt Erebus, other scientific studies, and maintenance of such equipment. The work force at LEH, which is composed of senior research scientists, professors and graduate students, maintains both scientific and logistical equipment on the mountain. Past research has included gaseous emission concentration, composition and flux as well as thermal image stills, visible and IR video, seismic, and infrasonic studies of the volcano.

== See also ==
- Research stations in Antarctica
- List of Antarctic field camps
