= Pericline =

Pericline may refer to any of the following geological or mineralogical structures:

- A doubly plunging anticline or syncline.
- A form of albite exhibiting elongate prismatic crystals.
- Pericline twinning, a type of crystal twinning in which crystals show fine parallel twin laminae, typically found in the alkali feldspar microcline. The twinning results from a structural transformation between high temperature and low temperature forms.
