= Hyalophane =

Barium-rich feldspar mineral

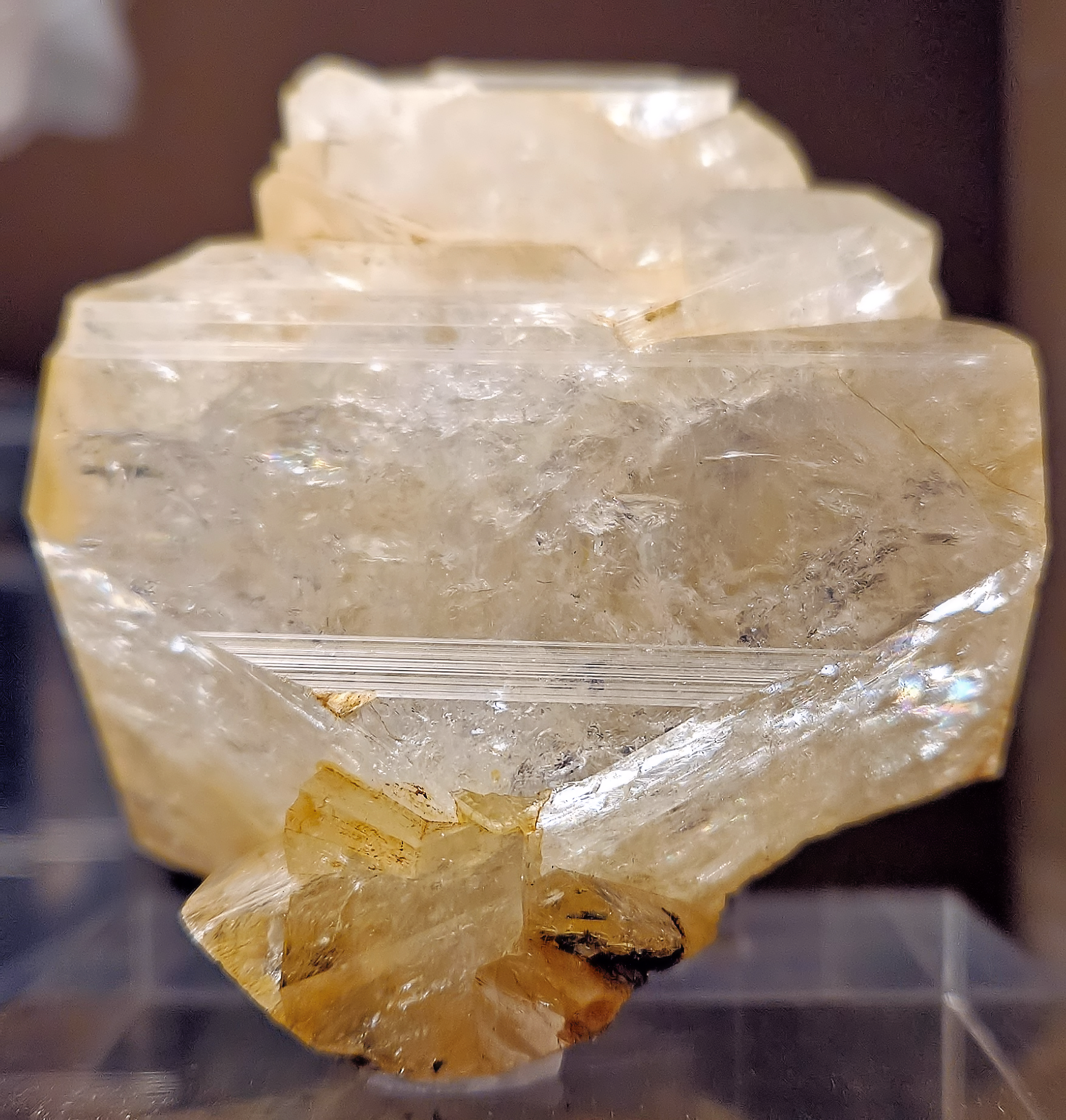
- Hyalophane crystal (Busovača, Bosnia and Herzegovina)

General
- Category: Tectosilicate minerals
- Group: Feldspar group
- Formula: (K,Ba)[Al(Si,Al)Si_{2}O_{8}]
- IMA status: Grandfathered (1855), variety of microcline or orthoclase
- Dana classification: 76.1.1.3
- Crystal system: Monoclinic
- Crystal class: Prismatic (2/m)
- Space group: C2/m (no. 12)
- Unit cell: a = 8.52 Å, b = 12.95 Å, c = 7.14 Å; β = 116°; Z = 4

Identification
- Formula mass: 302.06 g/mol
- Color: Colorless, yellow, white, red
- Crystal habit: Crystalline – fine – occurs as well-formed fine sized crystals; massive – uniformly indistinguishable crystals forming large masses
- Twinning: Commonly simple twins according to the Carlsbad, Manebach, or Baveno laws
- Cleavage: {001} perfect, {010} imperfect
- Fracture: Conchoidal
- Tenacity: Brittle
- Mohs scale hardness: 6 – 6 1/2
- Luster: Vitreous
- Streak: White
- Diaphaneity: Transparent to translucent
- Specific gravity: 2.81
- Optical properties: Biaxial (-)
- Refractive index: n_{α} = 1.542, n_{β} = 1.545, n_{γ} = 1.547
- Birefringence: δ = 0.005
- 2V angle: 48 – 79°
- Dispersion: Weak

Hyalophane or jaloallofane is a crystalline mineral, part of the feldspar group of tectosilicates. It is considered a barium-rich potassium feldspar. Its chemical formula is (K,Ba)[Al(Si,Al)Si_{2}O_{8}], and it has a hardness of 6 to 6 1/2. The name hyalophane comes from the Greek hyalos, meaning "glass", and phanos meaning "to appear".

An occurrence of hyalophane was discovered in 1855 in Lengenbach Quarry, Imfield, Binn valley, municipality of Binn, Canton of Valais, Switzerland. The mineral is found predominantly in Europe, with occurrences in Switzerland, Australia, Bosnia, Germany, Japan, New Jersey, and the west coast of North America. Hyalophane may be found in manganese deposits in compact metamorphic zones.

Hyalophane has a monoclinic crystallography, with cell properties a = 8.52 Å, b = 12.95 Å, c = 7.14 Å, and β = 116°. Optically, the material exhibits biaxial birefringence, with refractive index values of n_{α} = 1.542, n_{β} = 1.545, and n_{γ} = 1.547 and a maximum birefringence of δ = 0.005. It has weak dispersion and low surface relief.

Hyalophane has sometimes been used as a gemstone.
