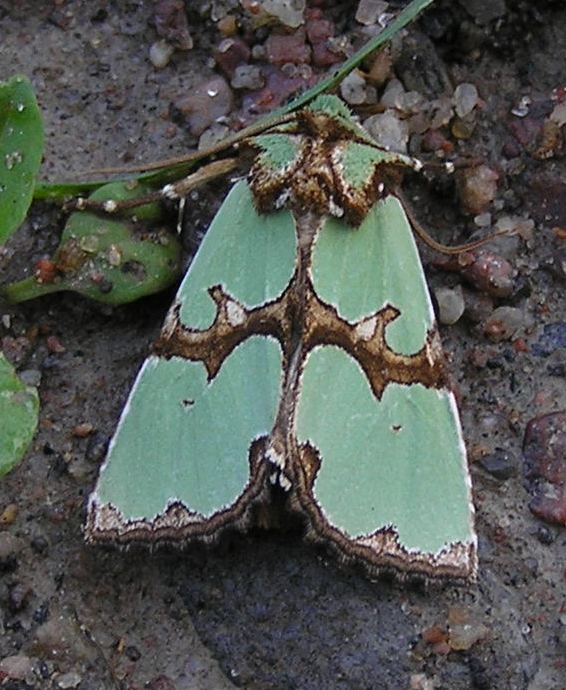

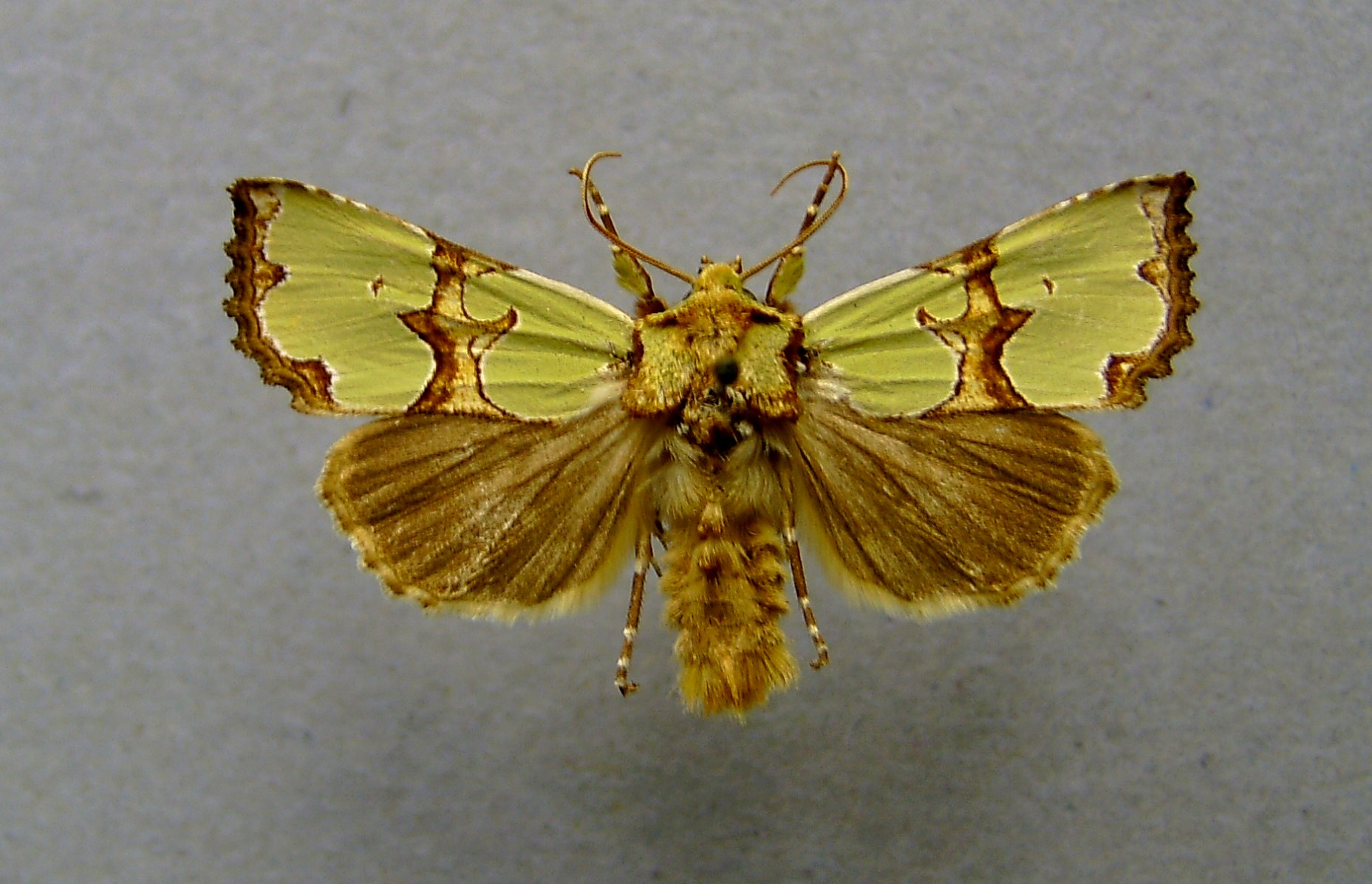

Scientific classification
- Kingdom: Animalia
- Phylum: Arthropoda
- Class: Insecta
- Order: Lepidoptera
- Superfamily: Noctuoidea
- Family: Noctuidae
- Genus: Staurophora
- Species: S. celsia

Binomial name
- Staurophora celsia (Linnaeus, 1758)

= Staurophora celsia =

Species of moth

Staurophora celsia is a moth of the family Noctuidae. The species can be found in Central Europe.

The wingspan is 36–46 mm.

The larvae feed on various grasses, such as Calamagrostis epigejos, Deschampsia cespitosa, Nardus stricta and Anthoxanthum odoratum.
