= Celsian =

Uncommon barium feldspar mineral

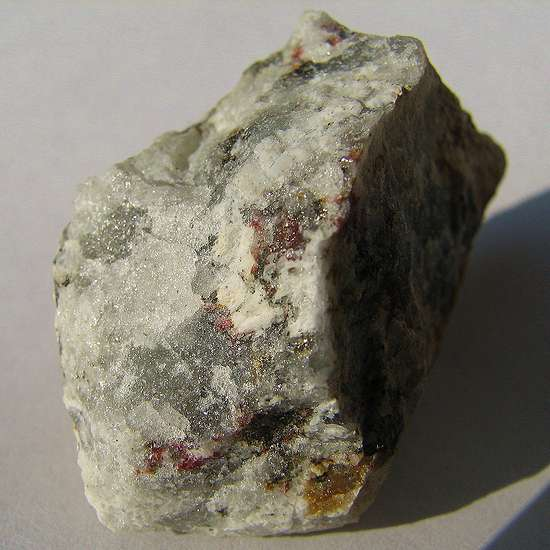
- Celsian (transparent/gray in photo) in sanbornite (white) and quartz matrix from Incline, Maricopa County, California (Size: 5 x 4 x 3 cm)

General
- Category: Tectosilicate minerals
- Group: Feldspar group
- Formula: BaAl_{2}Si_{2}O_{8}
- IMA symbol: Cls
- IMA status: Grandfathered (1895)
- Strunz classification: 9.FA.30
- Dana classification: 76.1.1.4
- Crystal system: Monoclinic
- Crystal class: Prismatic (2/m)
- Space group: I2/c (no. 15)
- Unit cell: a = 8.622(4) Å, b = 13.078(6) Å, c = 14.411(8) Å; β = 115.2°; Z = 8

Identification
- Color: Colorless, white, yellow
- Crystal habit: Short prismatic to acicular crystals, massive
- Twinning: Manebach twins on (001), baveno twins (021), rare lamellar twinning
- Cleavage: Perfect on {001}, good on {010}, poor on {110}
- Tenacity: Brittle
- Mohs scale hardness: 6–6.5
- Luster: Vitreous
- Diaphaneity: Transparent
- Specific gravity: 3.10 to 3.39
- Optical properties: Biaxial (+)
- Refractive index: n_{α} = 1.580–1.584 n_{β} = 1.585–1.587 n_{γ} = 1.594–1.596
- Birefringence: 0.014, biaxial –
- 2V angle: Measured: 86° to 90°

Celsian is an uncommon feldspar mineral, barium aluminosilicate, BaAl_{2}Si_{2}O_{8}. The mineral occurs in contact metamorphic rocks with significant barium content. Its crystal system is monoclinic, and it is white, yellow, or transparent in appearance. In pure form, it is transparent. Synthetic barium aluminosilicate is used as a ceramic in dental fillings and other applications.

The mineral is named after Anders Celsius (1701–1744).

== Composition ==
Celsian is a barium feldspar with a chemical composition BaAl_{2}Si_{2}O_{8}. It forms part of the feldspar group and belongs to the celsian-hyalophane series and the celsian-orthoclase series. It has some resemblance to anorthite, and it has four distinct polymorphs. The essential elements are silicon, aluminum, oxygen, and barium. Some common impurities in the mineral are iron, titanium, magnesium, potassium, and calcium. Celsian is stable from room temperature up to 1590 °C (Lin and Foster, 1968). The most common trace elements are potassium and calcium, in an analysis of the approximate chemical composition of celsian the following wt% were found:

•	SiO2—35.1 
•	Al2O3---26.8
•	BaO----35.8
•	K2O-----2.3
Total:100.0 (Newham and Megaw, 1960).

== Geologic occurrence ==
Celsian is of limited occurrence. Most of the barium feldspars are associated with exhalative hydrothermal processes and low-and medium-grade metamorphism (Moro and Cembranos and Fernandez, 2001). It is also associated with sedimentary and meta sedimentary rocks, manganese, ferromanganese and barite deposits.

Celsian can be found in places like Wales, Zamora (Spain), Alaska, California, Sweden and Japan, also with hendricksite on the Franklin mines in New Jersey.

== Structure ==
The symmetry in celsian is somewhat different from the symmetry normally found in feldspars. It is monoclinic with a body centered lattice similar to those of anorthite. Insufficient evidence has been found to suggest that celsian lacks a center of symmetry, so its space group is I 2/c (Newnham and Megaw, 1960). The space group differs from others of its group like orthoclase, albite and body center anorthite are C2/m, C1bar and I1bar.

X-ray analysis shows that the values for the lattice parameters a, b, c axes and angles are approximately a=863 pm, b=131.0 pm, c=1400 pm and β=116°, θ=90° (Gay, 1956).

There are 8 formula units per cell, and the general position is eightfold, so all atoms can lie in general positions (Newnham and Megaw, 1960). This structure is very similar to that of orthoclase and sanidine but differs in a couple of ways:

1. The distribution of Si and Al.
2. The coordinates of all the atoms.

The distribution of silicon and aluminium along the tetrahedral sites mixed with the nature of the barium atom makes an impact on the surrounding silicate framework (Newham and Megaw, 1960). The Si-Al bonds are partially ordered, and in some cases the aluminium substitute's silicon.

The order in celsian is very simple, each aluminium tetrahedron is surrounded by four silicon tetrahedra, and vice versa (Newham and Megaw, 1960). Also there is another type of transformation besides aluminium-silicon, where silicon-poor goes into a silicon-rich network that involves having to simultaneously be a replacement of Al, and Si at other sites.

The barium ion has an irregular configuration close to the one in potassium in the feldspars. Each barium has an oxygen close, and thanks to this configuration it has a strong effect on the silicon-oxygen-silicon bond angles.

=== Polymorphism ===
There are four distinctive polymorphs of celsian, two of them are the natural minerals and the other two are synthetic products. The first are paracelsian and celsian, the second ones are hexacelsian and the other one is related to the mineral cymrite (Lin and foster, 1967). The order of increasing stability is paracelsian→hexacelsian→celsian in a temperature range between 500 °C to the 1000 °C.

As temperature rises from the 1,600 °C to 1,760 °C it goes from celsian to a reversible form of hexacelsian. Paracelsian is less stable than the other two and celsian is the most stable.

== Twinning ==
Barium feldspars occur in optically uniform crystals where the twinning is poorly developed, except on coarse crystals. Eighteen crystal forms have been identified; eleven of them coincide with those known for orthoclase. Observed twining includes Manebach twins on (001) and Baveno twins on (021). Some samples of celsian were found to have a rare lamellar twinning (Spencer, 1941).

== Properties ==
=== Physical properties ===
Celsian shows a c(001) perfect cleavage and a b(010) good cleavage, which marks the difference with its polymorph paracelsian which has a [110] indistinct cleavage. There are different crystals habits like adularia, larger, stout crystals (Spencer, 1941), and long, slender to acicular. It is usually colorless and transparent with a pearly to non-fluorescent luster.

The density is about 3.31 to 3.33 g/cm^{3}. This might be the case due to some impurities in the structure of the mineral. It has a hardness of 6 on the Mohs scale, this hardness is due to the short length of the bond in the structure, since relatively short bonds tend to be harder.

=== Optical properties ===
Some other optical properties are the 2V angle which is approximately 88° with a maximum birefringence of 0.014, biaxial with a negative sign (Newnham and Megaw, 1960). It has a moderate relief.

== Uses ==
The uses of celsian are mostly related to glass and ceramics. This uses are usually achieved by the preparation of pure synthetic monoclinic celsian.

Celsian has very attractive features such as chemical stability and high mechanical resistance, which can be favourably exploited in order to obtain enhanced-performance composites with respect to bulk glass. (Cannillo, Carlier, Manfredini, Montorsi, and Siligardi 2006). Many studies show that by increasing the amount of celsian phases in the glasses results in increased bulk of crystallization (Khater and Idris, 2004).

== See also ==
- List of minerals
- List of minerals named after people
