= Sanidine =

Form of potassium feldspar

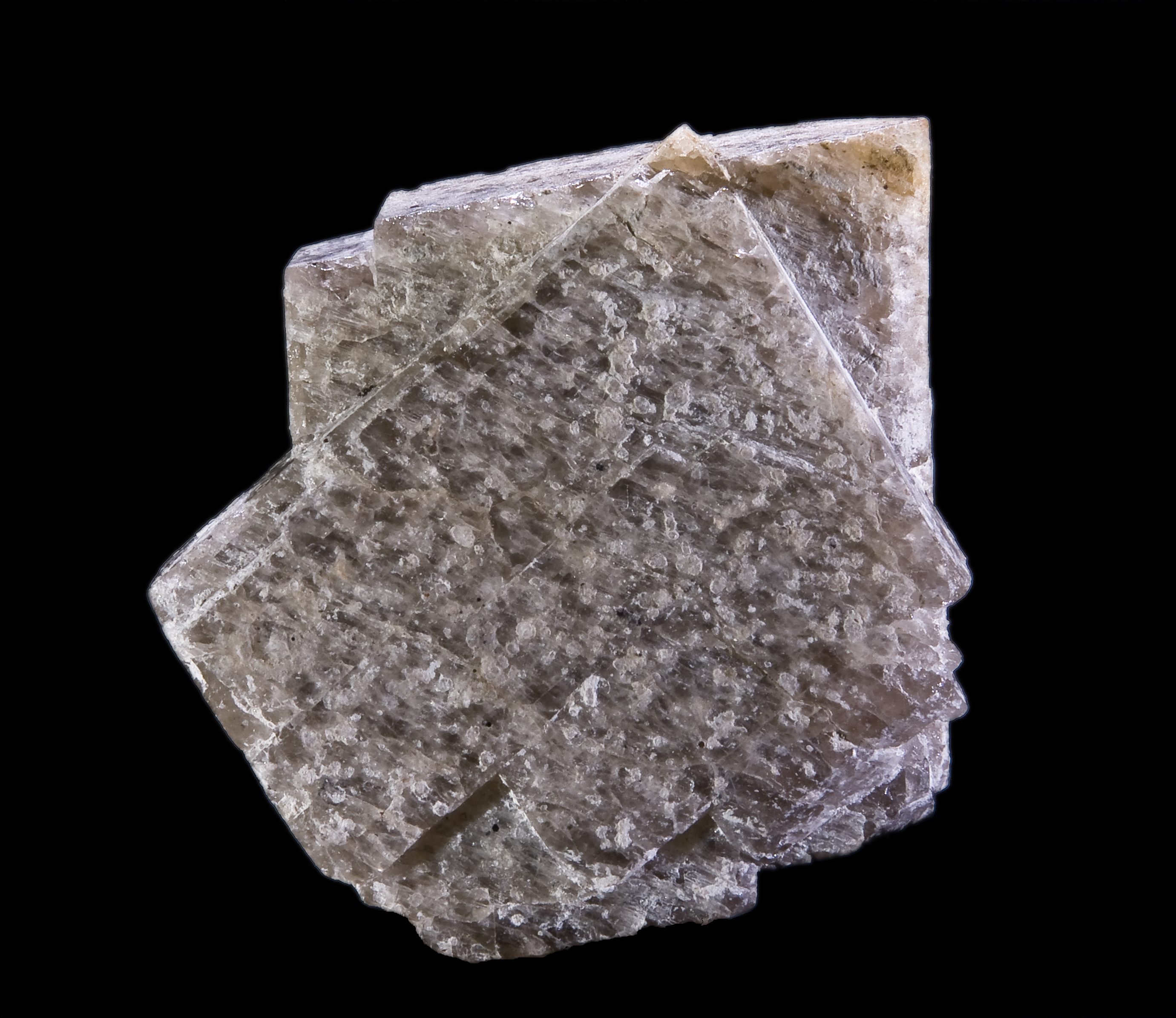
- Sanidine from Puy de Sancy, Monts-Dore massif, Puy-de-Dôme, France. Size 5 cm × 4.5 cm (2.0 in × 1.8 in)

General
- Category: Tectosilicate minerals
- Group: Feldspar group
- Series: Alkali feldspar series
- Formula: K(AlSi_{3}O_{8})
- IMA symbol: Sa
- IMA status: Grandfathered (before 1959)
- Strunz classification: 9.FA.30
- Dana classification: 76.01.01.02
- Crystal system: Monoclinic
- Crystal class: Prismatic (2/m)
- Space group: B2/m (no. 12)

Identification
- Color: Colorless to white
- Crystal habit: Tabular crystals, may be acicular
- Twinning: Carlsbad twinning common
- Cleavage: {001} perfect, {010} good
- Fracture: Uneven
- Tenacity: Brittle
- Mohs scale hardness: 6
- Luster: Vitreous, pearly on cleavage
- Streak: White
- Diaphaneity: Transparent to translucent
- Specific gravity: 2.52
- Optical properties: Biaxial (−)
- Refractive index: n_{α} = 1.518–1.525 n_{β} = 1.523–1.530 n_{γ} = 1.525–1.531
- Birefringence: δ = 0.007
- 2V angle: Measured: 18°–42° (low); 15°–63° (high)

Sanidine is the high temperature form of potassium feldspar with a general formula K(AlSi_{3}O_{8}). Sanidine is found most typically in felsic volcanic rocks such as obsidian, rhyolite and trachyte. Sanidine crystallizes in the monoclinic crystal system. Orthoclase is a monoclinic polymorph stable at lower temperatures. At yet lower temperatures, microcline, a triclinic polymorph of potassium feldspar, is stable.

Due to the high temperature and rapid quenching, sanidine can contain more sodium in its structure than the two polymorphs that equilibrated at lower temperatures. Sanidine and high albite constitute a solid solution series with intermediate compositions termed anorthoclase. Exsolution of an albite phase does occur; resulting cryptoperthite can best be observed in electron microprobe images.

== Occurrence ==
In addition to its presence in the groundmass of felsic rocks, sanidine is a common phenocryst in rhyolites and, to a lesser extent, rhyodacites. Trachyte consists largely of fine-grained sanidine.

Fallout ash beds in sedimentary rock of the western United States have been classified in part by whether sanidine phenocrysts are present and, if present, whether they are sodium-enriched. W-type rhyolite ash beds contain sodium-poor sanidine; G-type rhyolite ash beds contain sodium-rich sanidine; and dacite fallout ash beds frequently lack sanidine. Because of their high potassium content, sanidine phenocrysts are also very useful for radiometric dating of rhyolite ash beds by the K–Ar dating method.

== Composition ==
Although the ideal composition of sanidine is 64.76 wt% SiO_{2}, 18.32 wt% Al_{2}O_{3}, and 16.72 wt% K_{2}O, natural sanidine incorporates significant sodium, calcium, and iron(III). Calcium and sodium substitute for potassium (with concurrent substitution of additional aluminum for silicon, in the case of calcium) while ferric iron substitutes for aluminum. A typical natural composition is:

Component	Weight %
SiO_{2}	64.03
Al_{2}O_{3}	19.92
Fe_{2}O_{3}	0.62
CaO	0.45
Na_{2}O	4.57
K_{2}O	10.05

At elevated temperature, a complete solid solution exists between sanidine and albite. Rapid cooling of the sanidine freezes the composition, though most sanidine is cryptoperthitic, showing separate layers of low-sodium sanidine and albite at a sub-micron scale that can be detected only by X-ray crystallography or electron microscope methods.

== Order-disorder transitions ==
The crystal structure of ideal potassium feldspar has four sets of tetrahedral sites, each capable of accepting either an aluminum or a silicon ion. These are labeled the T_{1}o, T_{1}m, T_{2}o, and T_{2}m sites. In sanidine, the aluminum and silicon are distributed randomly among all four sites, and the T_{1}o and T_{1}m are mirror images of each other, as are the T_{2}o and T_{2}m sites. This produces a crystal with monoclinic symmetry. With slow cooling, the aluminum becomes concentrated in the T_{1} sites but remains randomly distributed between T_{1}o and T_{1}m sites. The resulting orthoclase crystal retains monoclinic symmetry but with different crystal axis lengths. Further cooling causes the aluminum to concentrate in the T_{1}o sites, breaking the monoclinic symmetry and producing triclinic microcline. Each transition requires exchange of ions between tetrahedral sites, which takes place at measurable rates only at high temperature.

== Sanidine and genesis of magmas ==
Pure sanidine melts incongruently at 1150 °C, yielding solid leucite and liquid. A mixture of sanidine with silica in the form of tridymite melts at a eutectic temperature of 990 °C, which defines the "granite" eutectic. The temperature at which granite begins to melt is lowered by several hundred degrees by the presence of water.
