= P1 (space group) =

P1 may refer to either of the following space groups in three dimensions:

- P1, space group no. 1
- P1̅, space group no. 2
