= Microcline =

Igneous rock-forming feldspar mineral

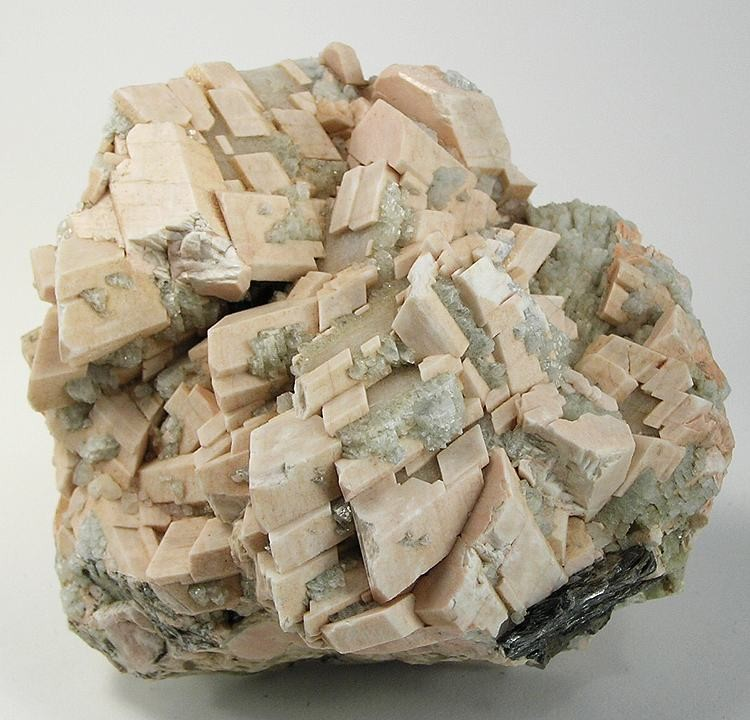

General
- Category: Tectosilicate minerals
- Group: Feldspar group
- Series: Alkali feldspar series
- Formula: KAlSi_{3}O_{8}
- IMA symbol: Mcc
- IMA status: Grandfathered (1830)
- Strunz classification: 9.FA.30
- Dana classification: 76.1.1.5
- Crystal system: Triclinic
- Crystal class: Pinacoidal (1̅)
- Space group: P1̅ (no. 2)

Identification
- Color: White, grey, greyish yellow, yellowish, tan, salmon-pink, bluish green, green.
- Crystal habit: Can be anhedral or euhedral. Grains are commonly elongate with a tabular appearance. May contain lamellae which formed from exsolved albite.
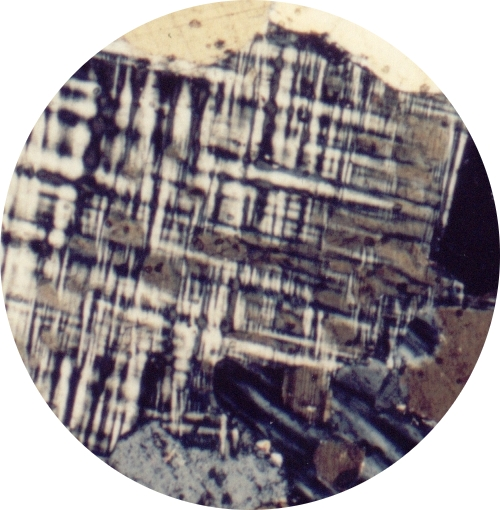
- Twinning: Typically displays albite twinning and pericline twinning. This combination leads to a grid pattern, hence microcline displays gridiron twinning. Can also display carlsbad twinning, simple twins, or lack twinning altogether. Lamellae in microcline are discontinuous and "pinch and swell". Photomicrograph of thin section of microcline showing crosshatched crystal twinning (in cross polarized light)
- Cleavage: Has perfect cleavage parallel to {001} and good cleavage on {010}. Cleavages intersect at 90°41'. It can be difficult to see cleavage in thin section due to microcline's low relief.
- Fracture: Uneven
- Tenacity: Brittle
- Mohs scale hardness: 6–6.5
- Luster: Vitreous
- Streak: White
- Diaphaneity: Transparent, translucent
- Specific gravity: 2.5–2.6
- Optical properties: Biaxial negative
- Refractive index: nα = 1.514 – 1.529 nβ = 1.518 – 1.533 nγ = 1.521 – 1.539
- Birefringence: Up to first order white (roughly 0.007)
- Pleochroism: N/A
- 2V angle: 65–88°
- Extinction: Inclined extinction to cleavage
- Diagnostic features: Gridiron twinning distinguishes microcline from other feldspars. Distinguishable from plagioclase because the lamellae in plagioclase are continuous and do not "pinch and swell."
- Alters to: Commonly alters to sericite or clay.
- Relief: Low negative relief
- Optical sign: Biaxial negative
- Color in PPL: Colorless

Microcline (KAlSi_{3}O_{8}) is an important igneous rock-forming tectosilicate mineral. It is a potassium-rich alkali feldspar. It is common in granite and pegmatites. Microcline forms during slow cooling of orthoclase. Sanidine is a polymorph of alkali feldspar stable at yet higher temperature. Microcline has cross-hatch twinning that forms as a result of the transformation of monoclinic orthoclase into triclinic microcline.

The chemical compound name is potassium aluminium silicate, and it is known as E number reference E555.

== Geology ==
Microcline may be chemically the same as monoclinic orthoclase, but because it belongs to the triclinic crystal system, the prism angle is slightly less than right angles; hence the name "microcline" from the Greek "small slope". Microcline is identical to orthoclase in many physical properties, and can be distinguished by x-ray or optical examination. When viewed under a polarizing microscope, microcline exhibits a minute multiple twinning which forms a grating-like structure that is unmistakable.

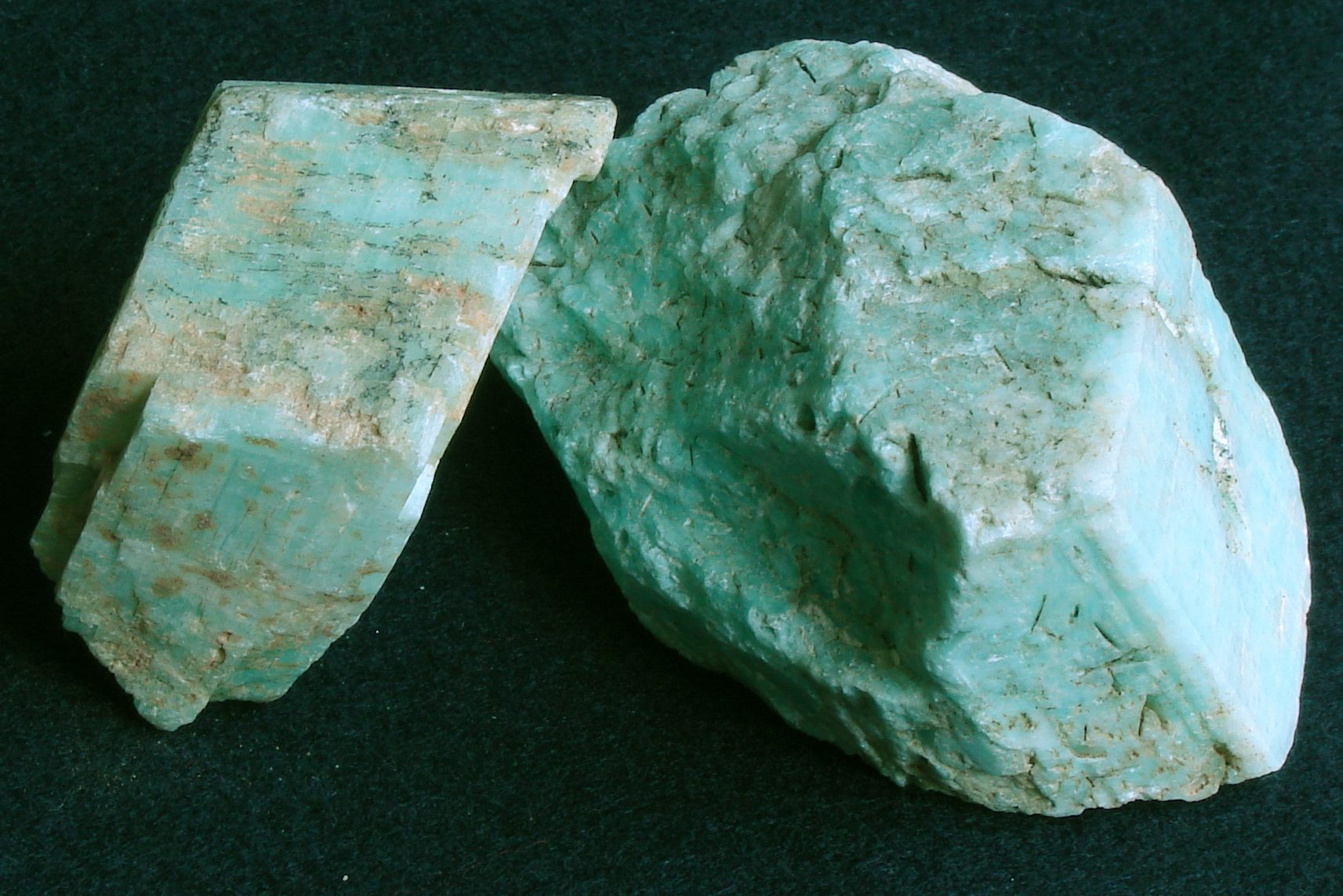
Microcline (amazonite variety)

Perthite is either microcline or orthoclase with thin lamellae of exsolved albite.

Amazon stone, or amazonite, is a green variety of microcline. It is not found anywhere in the Amazon Basin, however. The Spanish explorers who named it apparently confused it with another green mineral from that region.

The largest documented single crystals of microcline were found in Devil's Hole Beryl Mine, Colorado, US and measured ~50 × 36 × 14 m. This could be one of the largest crystals of any material found so far.

Microcline is exceptionally active ice-nucleating agent in the atmosphere. Recently it has been possible to understand how water binds to the microcline surface.

== As food additive ==
The chemical compound name is potassium aluminium silicate, and it is known as E number reference E555. It was the subject in 2018 of a Call for technical and toxicological data from the EFSA.

In 2008, it (along with other aluminium compounds) was the subject of a Scientific Opinion of the Panel on Food Additives, Flavourings, Processing Aids and Food Contact Materials from the EFSA.

== See also ==
- List of minerals
