= Feldspar =

Group of rock-forming minerals

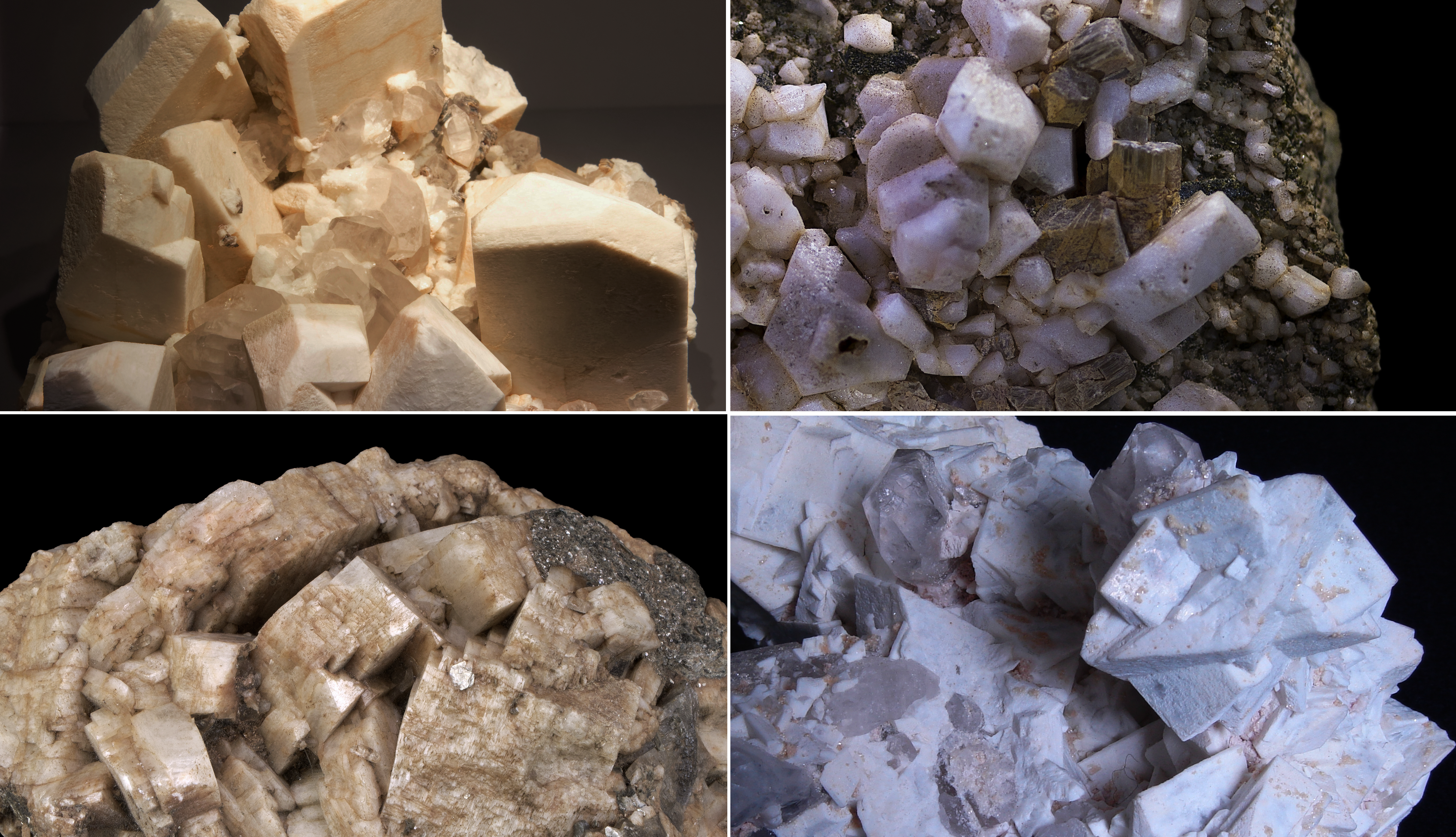
- Feldspar minerals. Clockwise from top left: orthoclase, albite, microcline, and an indeterminate plagioclase

General
- Category: Tectosilicate minerals
- Formula: KAlSi_{3}O_{8} – NaAlSi_{3}O_{8} – CaAl_{2}Si_{2}O_{8}
- IMA symbol: Fsp
- IMA status: Mineral group
- Crystal system: Triclinic or monoclinic

Identification
- Color: pink, white, grey, brown, blue
- Cleavage: two or three at 90 degree
- Fracture: along cleavage planes
- Mohs scale hardness: 6.0–6.5
- Luster: vitreous
- Streak: white
- Diaphaneity: opaque
- Specific gravity: 2.55–2.76
- Density: 2.56
- Refractive index: 1.518–1.526
- Birefringence: first order
- Pleochroism: none
- Other characteristics: exsolution lamellae common

Feldspar (/ˈfɛl(d).ˌspɑːr/ FEL(D)-spar; sometimes spelled felspar) is a group of rock-forming aluminium tectosilicate minerals, also containing other cations such as sodium, calcium, potassium, or barium. The most common members of the feldspar group are the plagioclase (sodium-calcium) feldspars and the alkali (potassium-sodium) feldspars. Feldspars make up about 60% of the Earth's crust and 41% of the Earth's continental crust by weight.

Feldspars crystallize from magma as both intrusive and extrusive igneous rocks and are also present in many types of metamorphic rock. Rock formed almost entirely of calcic plagioclase feldspar is known as anorthosite. Feldspars are also found in many types of sedimentary rocks.

== Etymology ==
The name feldspar derives from the German Feldspat, a compound of the words Feld ("field") and Spat ("flake"). Spat had long been used as the word for "a rock easily cleaved into flakes"; Feldspat was introduced in the 18th century as a more specific term, referring perhaps to its common occurrence in rocks found in fields (Urban Brückmann, 1783) or to its occurrence as "fields" within granite and other minerals (René-Just Haüy, 1804). The change from Spat to -spar was influenced by the English word spar, meaning a non-opaque mineral with good cleavage. Feldspathic refers to materials that contain feldspar. The alternative spelling, felspar, has fallen out of use. The term "felsic", meaning light coloured minerals such as quartz and feldspars, is an acronymic word derived from feldspar and silica, unrelated to the obsolete spelling "felspar".

== Compositions ==
Compositional phase diagram of the different minerals that constitute the feldspar solid solution

The feldspar group of minerals consists of tectosilicates, silicate minerals in which silicon ions are linked by shared oxygen ions to form a three-dimensional network. Compositions of major elements in common feldspars can be expressed in terms of three endmembers:

- orthoclase endmember KAlSi_{3}O_{8}
- albite endmember NaAlSi_{3}O_{8}
- anorthite endmember CaAl_{2}Si_{2}O_{8}

Solid solutions between orthoclase and albite are called alkali feldspar. Solid solutions between albite and anorthite are called plagioclase, or, more properly, plagioclase feldspar. Only limited solid solution occurs between K-feldspar and anorthite, and in the two other solid solutions, immiscibility occurs at temperatures common in the crust of the Earth. Albite is considered both a plagioclase and an alkali feldspar.

The ratio of alkali feldspar to plagioclase feldspar, together with the proportion of quartz, is the basis for the QAPF classification of igneous rock. Calcium-rich plagioclase is the first feldspar to crystallize from cooling magma, then the plagioclase becomes increasingly sodium-rich as crystallization continues. This defines the continuous Bowen's reaction series. K-feldspar is the final feldspar to crystallize from the magma.

=== Alkali feldspars ===
Alkali feldspars are grouped into two types: those containing potassium in combination with sodium, aluminium, or silicon; and those where potassium is replaced by barium. The first of these include:

- orthoclase (monoclinic) KAlSi_{3}O_{8}
- sanidine (monoclinic) (K,Na)AlSi_{3}O_{8}
- microcline (triclinic) KAlSi_{3}O_{8}
- anorthoclase (triclinic) (Na,K)AlSi_{3}O_{8}

Potassium and sodium feldspars are not perfectly miscible in the melt at low temperatures, therefore intermediate compositions of the alkali feldspars occur only in higher temperature environments. Sanidine is stable at the highest temperatures, and microcline at the lowest. Perthite is a typical texture in alkali feldspar, due to exsolution of contrasting alkali feldspar compositions during cooling of an intermediate composition. The perthitic textures in the alkali feldspars of many granites can be seen with the naked eye. Microperthitic textures in crystals are visible using a light microscope, whereas cryptoperthitic textures can be seen only with an electron microscope.

=== Ammonium feldspar ===
Buddingtonite is an ammonium feldspar with the chemical formula: NH_{4}AlSi_{3}O_{8}. It is a mineral associated with hydrothermal alteration of the primary feldspar minerals.

=== Barium feldspars ===
Barium feldspars form as the result of the substitution of barium for potassium in the mineral structure. Barium feldspars are sometimes classified as a separate group of feldspars, and sometimes they are classified as a sub-group of alkali feldspars.

The barium feldspars are monoclinic and include the following:

- celsian BaAl_{2}Si_{2}O_{8}
- hyalophane (K,Ba)(Al,Si)_{4}O_{8}

=== Plagioclase feldspars ===
The plagioclase feldspars are triclinic. The plagioclase series follows (with percent anorthite in parentheses):

- albite (0 to 10) NaAlSi_{3}O_{8}
- oligoclase (10 to 30) (Na,Ca)(Al,Si)AlSi_{2}O_{8}
- andesine (30 to 50) NaAlSi_{3}O_{8} – CaAl_{2}Si_{2}O_{8}
- labradorite (50 to 70) (Ca,Na)Al(Al,Si)Si_{2}O_{8}
- bytownite (70 to 90) (NaSi,CaAl)AlSi_{2}O_{8}
- anorthite (90 to 100) CaAl_{2}Si_{2}O_{8}

Intermediate compositions of exsolve to two feldspars of contrasting composition during cooling, but diffusion is much slower than in alkali feldspar, and the resulting two-feldspar intergrowths typically are too fine-grained to be visible with optical microscopes. The immiscibility gaps in plagioclase solid solutions are more complex than those in alkali feldspars. The play of colours visible in some feldspar of labradorite composition is due to very fine-grained exsolution lamellae known as Bøggild intergrowth. The specific gravity in the plagioclase series increases from albite (2.62) to anorthite (2.72–2.75).

== Structure ==
The structure of a feldspar crystal is based on aluminosilicate tetrahedra. Each tetrahedron consists of an aluminium or silicon ion surrounded by four oxygen ions. Each oxygen ion, in turn, is shared by a neighbouring tetrahedron to form a three-dimensional network. The structure can be visualized as long chains of aluminosilicate tetrahedra, sometimes described as crankshaft chains because their shape is kinked. Each crankshaft chain links to neighbouring crankshaft chains to form a three-dimensional network of fused four-member rings. The structure is open enough for cations, typically sodium, potassium, or calcium, to fit into it and provide charge balance.

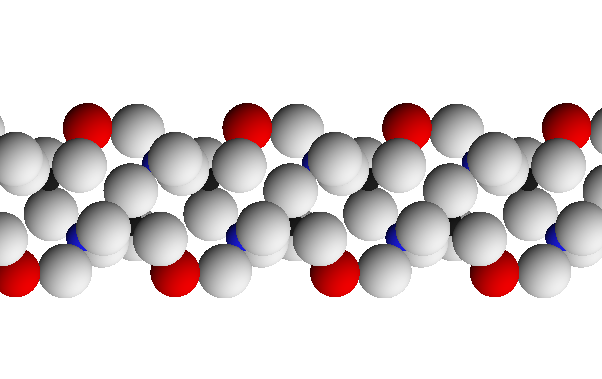
Diagram showing part of a crankshaft chain of feldspar

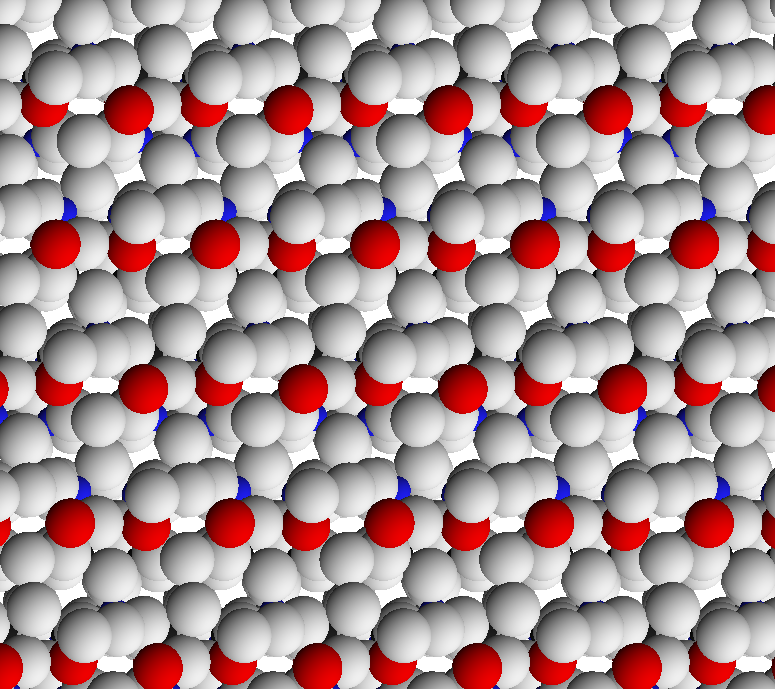
Feldspar crystal structure viewed along the c axis

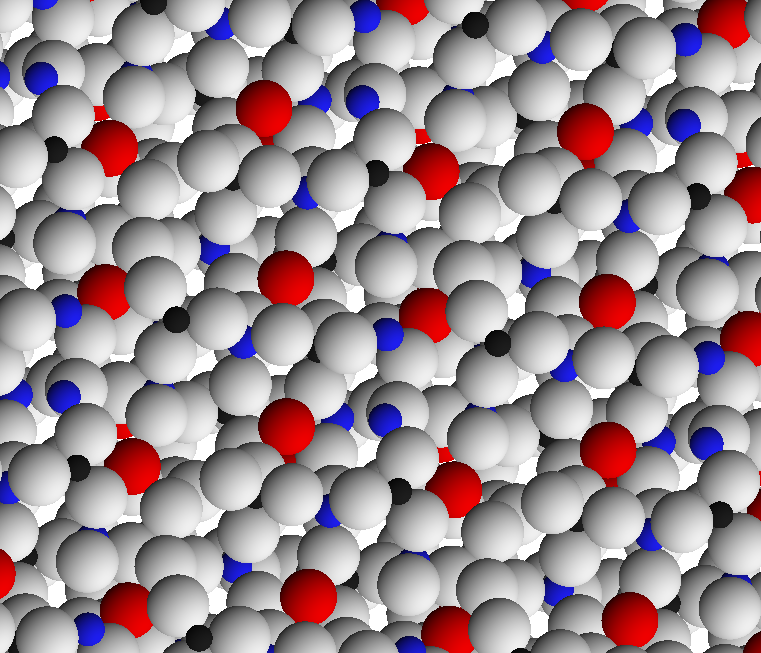
Feldspar crystal structure viewed along the a axis

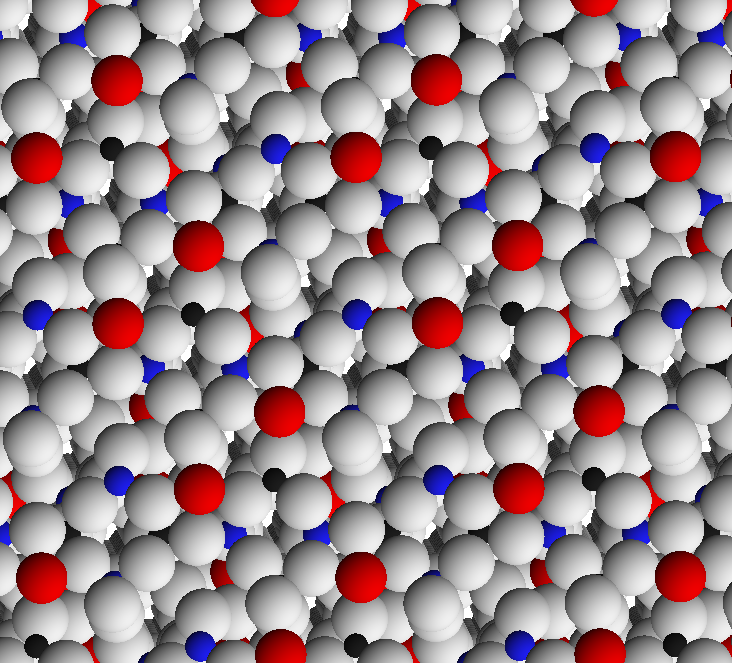
Feldspar crystal structure viewed along the b axis

== Weathering ==
Chemical weathering of feldspars happens by hydrolysis and produces clay minerals, including illite, smectite, and kaolinite. Hydrolysis of feldspars begins with the feldspar dissolving in water, which happens best in acidic or basic solutions and less well in neutral ones. The speed at which feldspars are weathered is controlled by how quickly they are dissolved. Dissolved feldspar reacts with H^{+} or OH^{−} ions and precipitates clays. The reaction also produces new ions in solution, with the variety of ions controlled by the type of feldspar reacting.

The abundance of feldspars in the Earth's crust means that clays are very abundant weathering products. About 40% of minerals in sedimentary rocks are clays and clays are the dominant minerals in the most common sedimentary rocks, mudrocks. They are also an important component of soils. Feldspar that has been replaced by clay looks chalky compared to more crystalline and glassy unweathered feldspar grains.

Feldspars, especially plagioclase feldspars, are not very stable at the Earth's surface due to their high formation temperature. This lack of stability is why feldspars are easily weathered to clays. Because of this tendency to weather easily, feldspars are usually not prevalent in sedimentary rocks. Sedimentary rocks that contain large amounts of feldspar indicate that the sediment did not undergo much chemical weathering before being buried. This means it was probably transported a short distance in cold and/or dry conditions that did not promote weathering, and that it was quickly buried by other sediment. Sandstones with large amounts of feldspar are called arkoses.

== Applications ==
Feldspar is a common raw material used in glassmaking, ceramics, and to some extent as a filler and extender in paints, plastics, and rubber. In the US, about 66% of feldspar is consumed in glassmaking, including glass containers and glass fibre. Ceramics (including electrical insulators, sanitaryware, tableware and tile) and other uses, such as fillers, accounted for the remainder.

Glass: Feldspar provides both K_{2}O and Na_{2}O for fluxing, and Al_{2}O_{3} and CaO as stabilizers. As an important source of Al_{2}O_{3} for glassmaking, feldspar is valued for its low iron and refractory mineral content, a low cost per unit of Al_{2}O_{3}, no volatiles and no waste.

Ceramics: Feldspars are used in the ceramic industry as a flux to form a glassy phase in bodies during firing, and thus promote vitrification. They are also used as a source of alkalies and alumina in glazes. The composition of feldspar used in different ceramic formulations varies depending on various factors, including the properties of the individual grade, the other raw materials and the requirements of the finished products. However, typical additions include: tableware, 15% to 30% feldspar; high-tension electrical porcelains, 25% to 35%; sanitaryware, 25%; wall tile, 0% to 10%; and dental porcelain up to 80% feldspar.

Earth sciences: In earth sciences and archaeology, feldspars are used for potassium–argon dating, argon–argon dating and luminescence dating.

Minor use: Some household cleaners (such as Bar Keepers Friend and Bon Ami) use feldspar to give a mild abrasive action.

== Production ==
Feldspar production

The USGS estimated global production of feldspar in 2020 to be 26 million tonnes, with the top four producing countries being: China 2 million tonnes; India 5 million tonnes; Italy 4 million; Turkey 7.6 million tonnes.

=== Commercial grades ===
Typical mineralogical and chemical analyses of three commercial grades used in ceramics are:

Product name	Norfloat K	Forshammar	FFF K6
Country	Norway	Sweden	Finland
Producing company	North Cape	Sibelco	Sibelco
Albite, %	23	40	41
Microcline, %	71	23	37
Anorthite, %	3	—	4
Quartz, %	3	33	8
SiO_{2}, %	65.9	75.7	67.9
Al_{2}O_{3}, %	18.6	14.1	18.3
Fe_{2}O_{3}, %	0.07	0.15	0.11
TiO_{2}, %	—	0.02	0.01
CaO, %	0.40	0.30	0.70
MgO, %	—	0.10	0.01
K_{2}O, %	11.8	3.8	6.4
Na_{2}O, %	2.9	5.0	5.5
LOI (Loss on Ignition), %	0.2	0.5	0.2

== Extraterrestrial ==
In October 2012, the Curiosity rover found high feldspar content in a Mars rock.

== Gallery ==
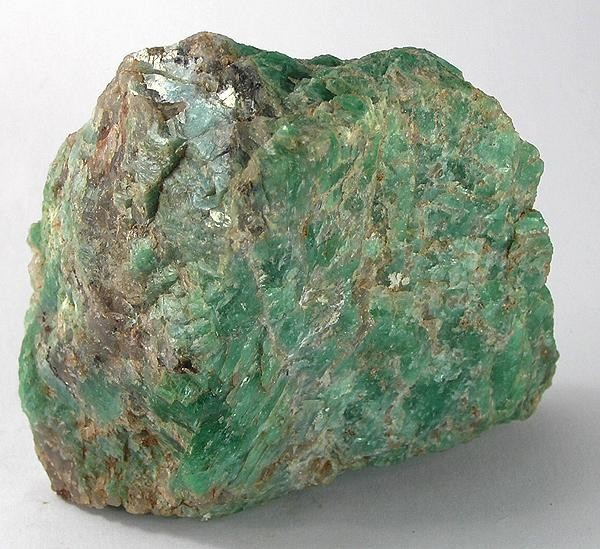
Specimen of rare plumbian (lead-rich) feldspar

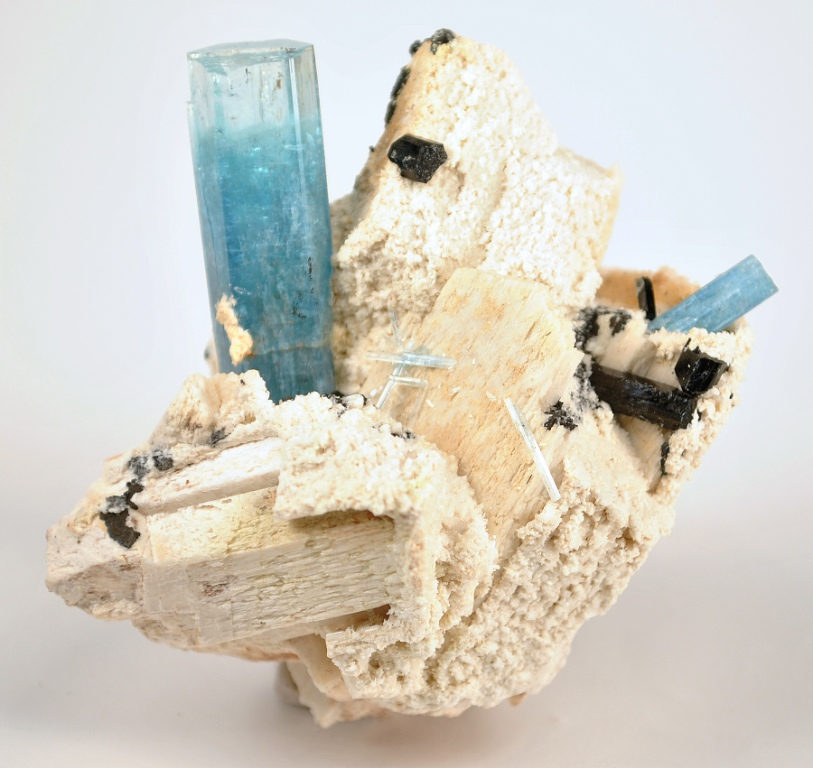
Crystallized white feldspar, with an upright 4 cm aquamarine crystal perched on it

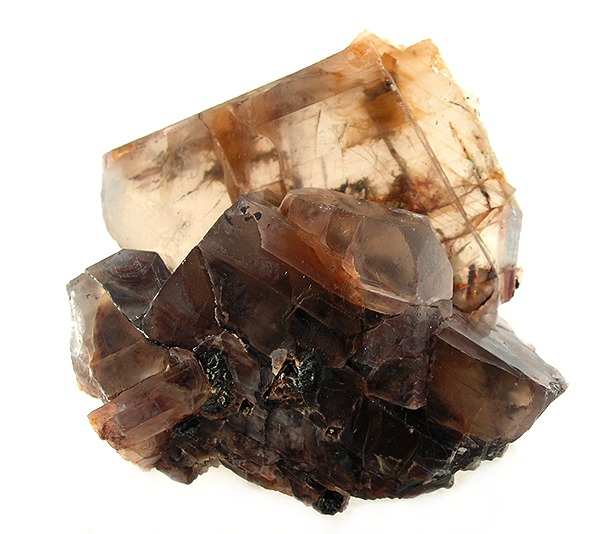
Feldspar and moonstone, from Sonora, Mexico

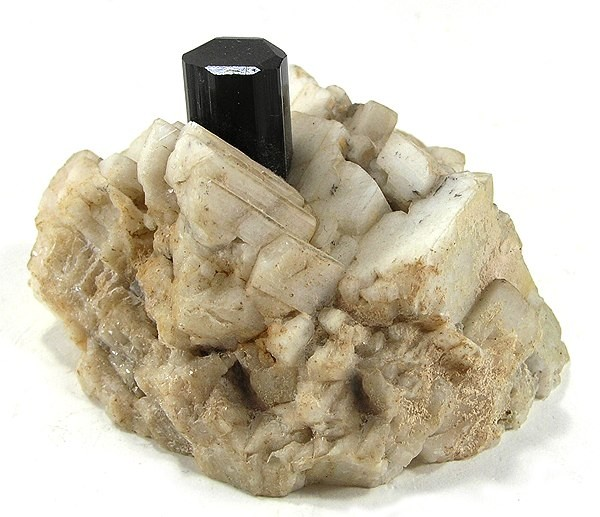
A cluster of euhedral feldspar crystals with a schorl crystal

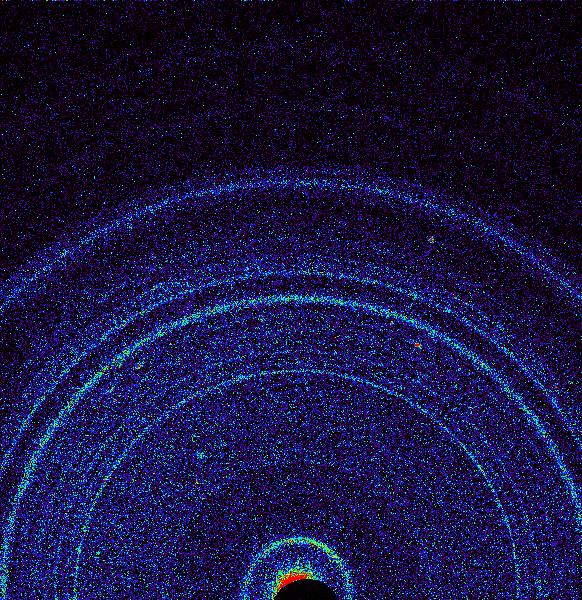
First X-ray view of Martian soil—feldspar, pyroxenes, olivine revealed (Curiosity rover at "Rocknest", October 17, 2012)

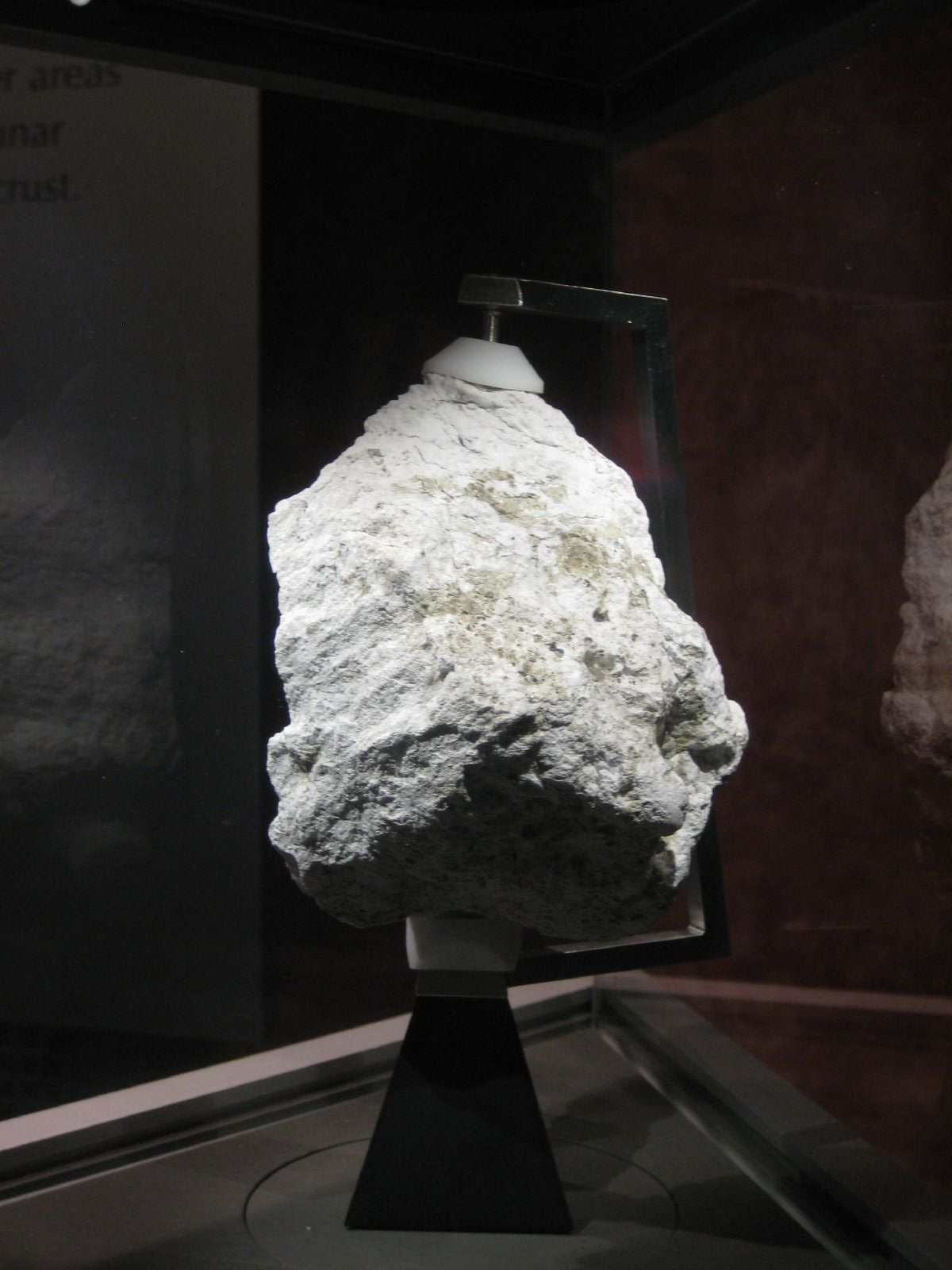
Lunar ferrous anorthosite #60025 (plagioclase feldspar). Collected by Apollo 16 from the Lunar Highlands near Descartes Crater. This sample is currently on display at the National Museum of Natural History in Washington, D.C.

== See also ==
- List of minerals
- List of countries by feldspar production
- Rainbow lattice sunstone
