= Brown spar =

Secondary minerals of antimony oxide class

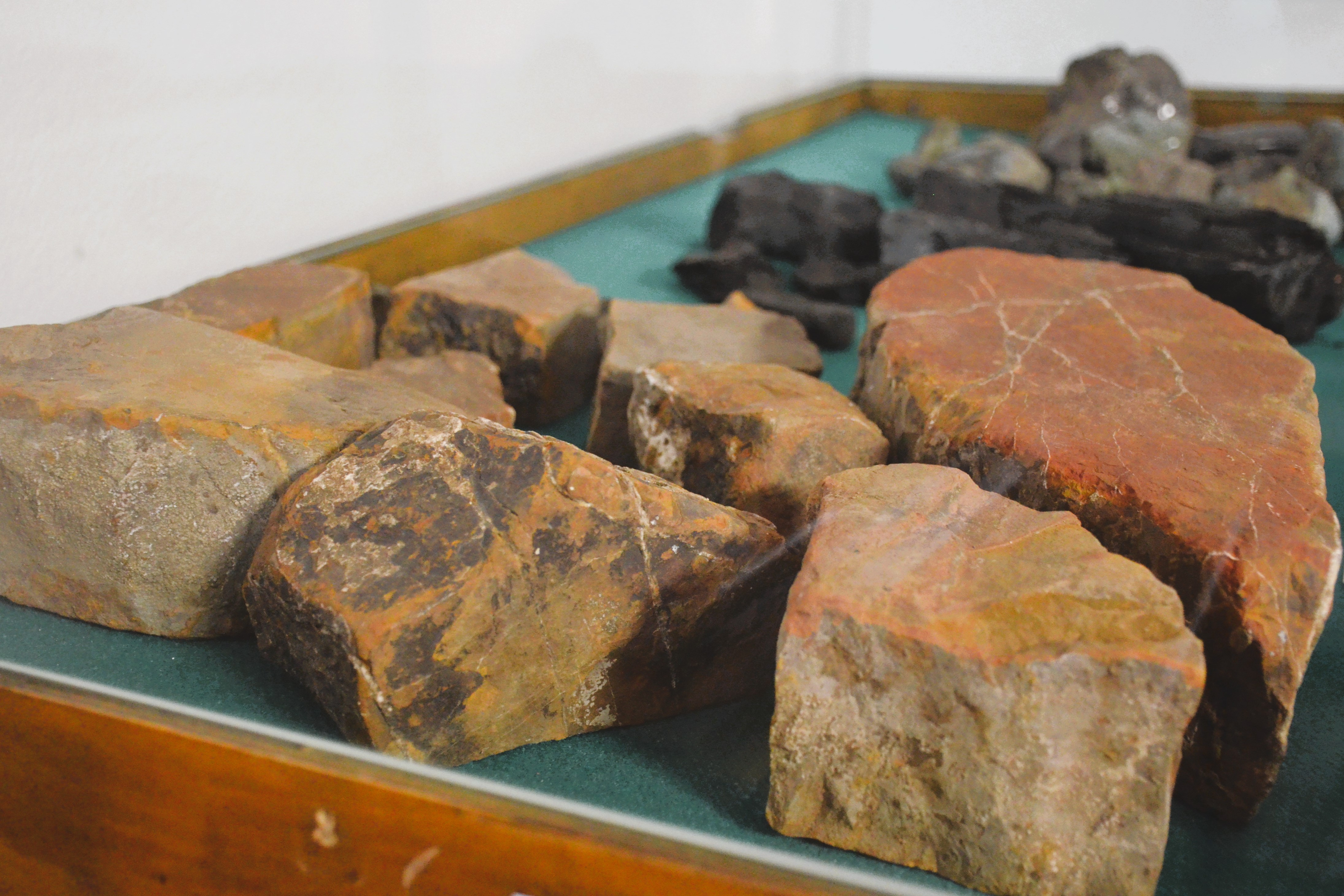
- Brown spar (siderite, Silesia)

General
- Category: Minerals

Brown spar or brown-spar (German: braunspat) is a trivial, partly obsolete name for at least four carbonate minerals that are relatively similar in composition: ankerite, dolomite (with varieties), magnesite (with varieties) and siderite, which have a characteristic dirty-brown hue due to the content of iron compounds, as well as an admixture of manganese oxide. As a consequence, many varieties of dolomite, colored brown or grey-brown by impurities, are also known as brown spar.

The impurity composition of brown feldspars allowed them to be classified in the 19th century as isomorphic natural mixtures and to pose the problem of classifying them as one or another fixed type of minerals with a separate name, description and chemical composition. In his student dissertation of 1856, Dmitri Mendeleev wrote about this fundamental mineralogical problem with all certainty: ″...take any isomorphic minerals, for example, calcareous and bitter earth (Talkspath) feldspars; in them both the crystalline form and the rational chemical composition are similar, and we separate them because there is some constancy in the composition (the first is almost pure CaC, the second is sometimes even completely pure MgC...) <...> There are up to 5 feldspars, standing in the middle either by chemical composition or by form. Brown or bitter feldspar represents a transition by both properties: its composition is generally nMgC + mCaC, and its rhombohedral angle = 106°15′20′′. It would be very interesting to know: do all gradual transitions in crystalline form and chemical composition exist, and are the first ones not accomplished in leaps, i.e. do rhombohedrons of feldspars of all possible changes from 105°8′ to 106°18′ and 107°[40]20′ exist? If such transitional forms exist, then of course there is no reason to sharply separate the forms that are more common for one reason or another and make special species out of them <with a separate name>. On the contrary, when the non-gradual change of angles with the gradual change of composition is demonstrated, then the present division of feldspars into several types will be based on solid principles″.

The name brown spar is both capacious and vividly descriptive, referring exclusively to the appearance of the stones; short and convenient for everyday conversational use, it was approximately equally characteristic of both English-language and German mineralogy until the end of the 19th century. However, even later this stable phrase remained in the speech of miners, geologists and other craft specialties — as a colloquial term of broad or not entirely definite meaning, applicable to three or even four different minerals.

== Main minerals and varieties ==
- Ankerite is a mineral, a complex carbonate from the dolomite group, in which some of the magnesium ions are replaced by iron, calculated formula Ca(Fe,Mg,Mn)(CO_{3})_{2}. The chemical composition is sometimes complicated by impurities of manganese and cobalt. The ferrous member of the dolomite-ankerite isomorphic series, structurally close to dolomite.
- Dolomite or bitter spar is a mineral common in the earth's crust from the class of carbonates with the chemical composition CaCO_{3}•MgCO_{3}, varieties close to dolomite from the same isomorphic series, colored brown or dirty brown by iron and manganese impurities (ferriferous dolomite) can also be found under the name brown spar.
- Siderite is a hydrothermal or sedimentary mineral, in composition iron carbonate with the ideal formula FeCO_{3}, depending on the amount and nature of impurities, has a color from white or yellowish-white to reddish-brown. Dirty-colored differences of brown shades are known as brown spar.
- Magnesite (ferrous) or breunnerite is a mineral common in the earth's crust from the class of carbonates with the chemical composition MgCO_{3}. Among the most common impurities found in magnesite are the same iron ions (Fe^{2+}) or manganese, which give the white or translucent mineral a cloudy red or brown color. In such cases, it can also be called brown spar.
- Mesitine spar (mesitite), or breunnerite — a carbonate of iron and manganese, occurring in yellowish rhombohedrons. This includes much of what is called rhomb spar (rhombic spar), or brown spar, which becomes rusty on exposure.
- Mesitine spar (pistomesite), — another brown variety of the magnesite → siderite isomorphic series, formerly known as mesitite or brown spar and containing a greater amount of iron carbonate than mesitite and breunnerite.

== Brown spar gallery ==
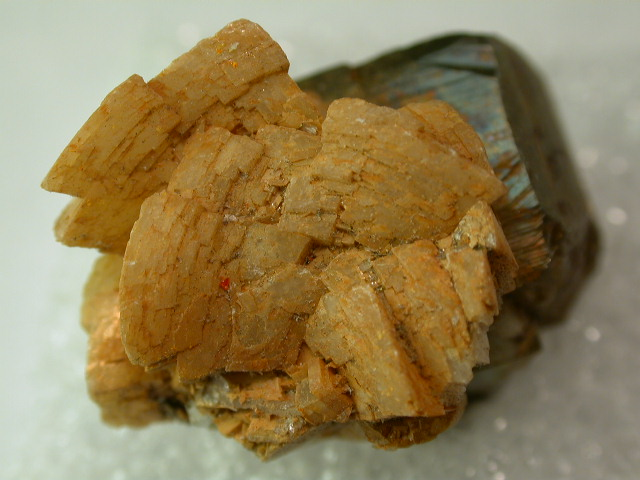
Ankerite

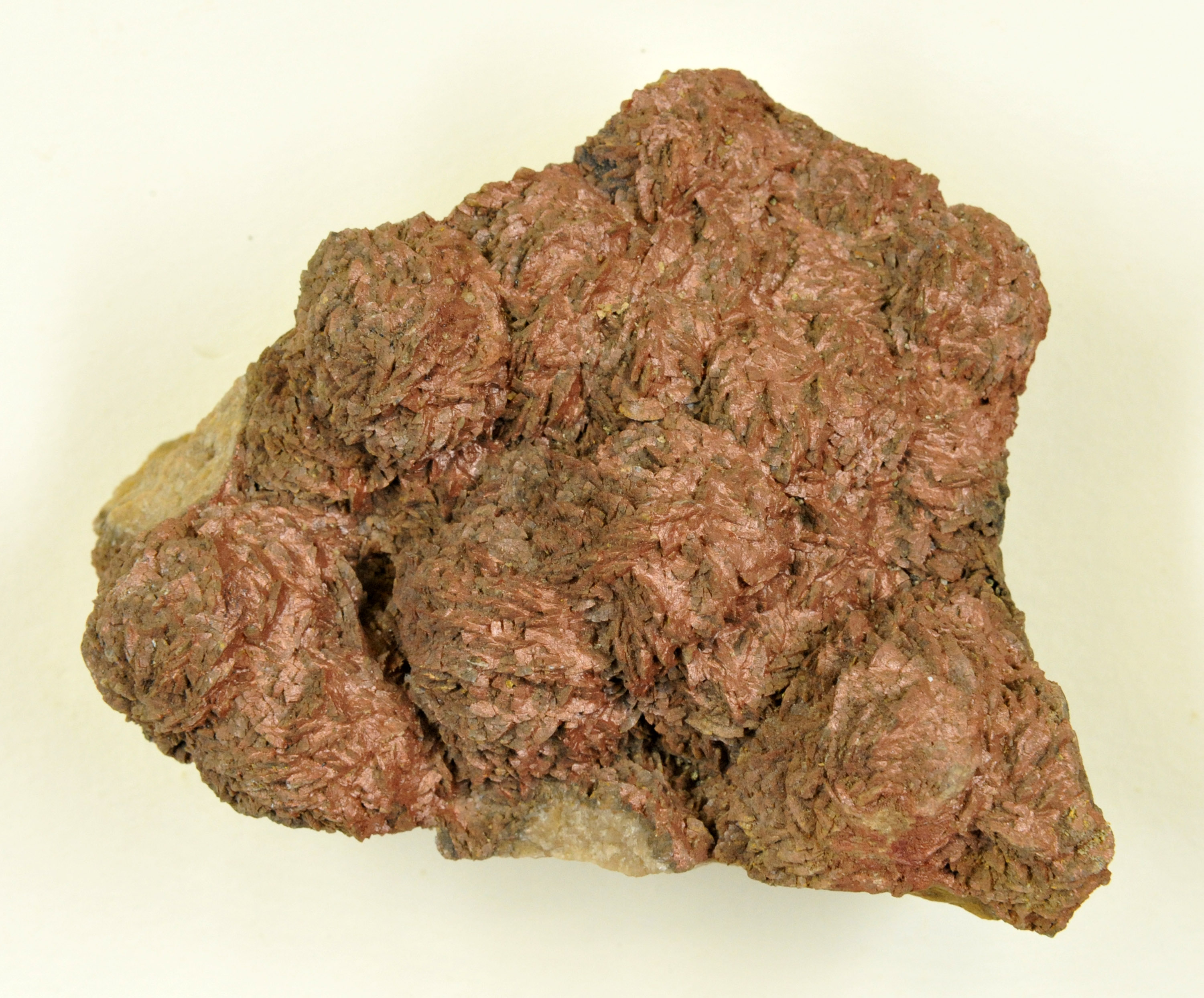
Brown dolomite

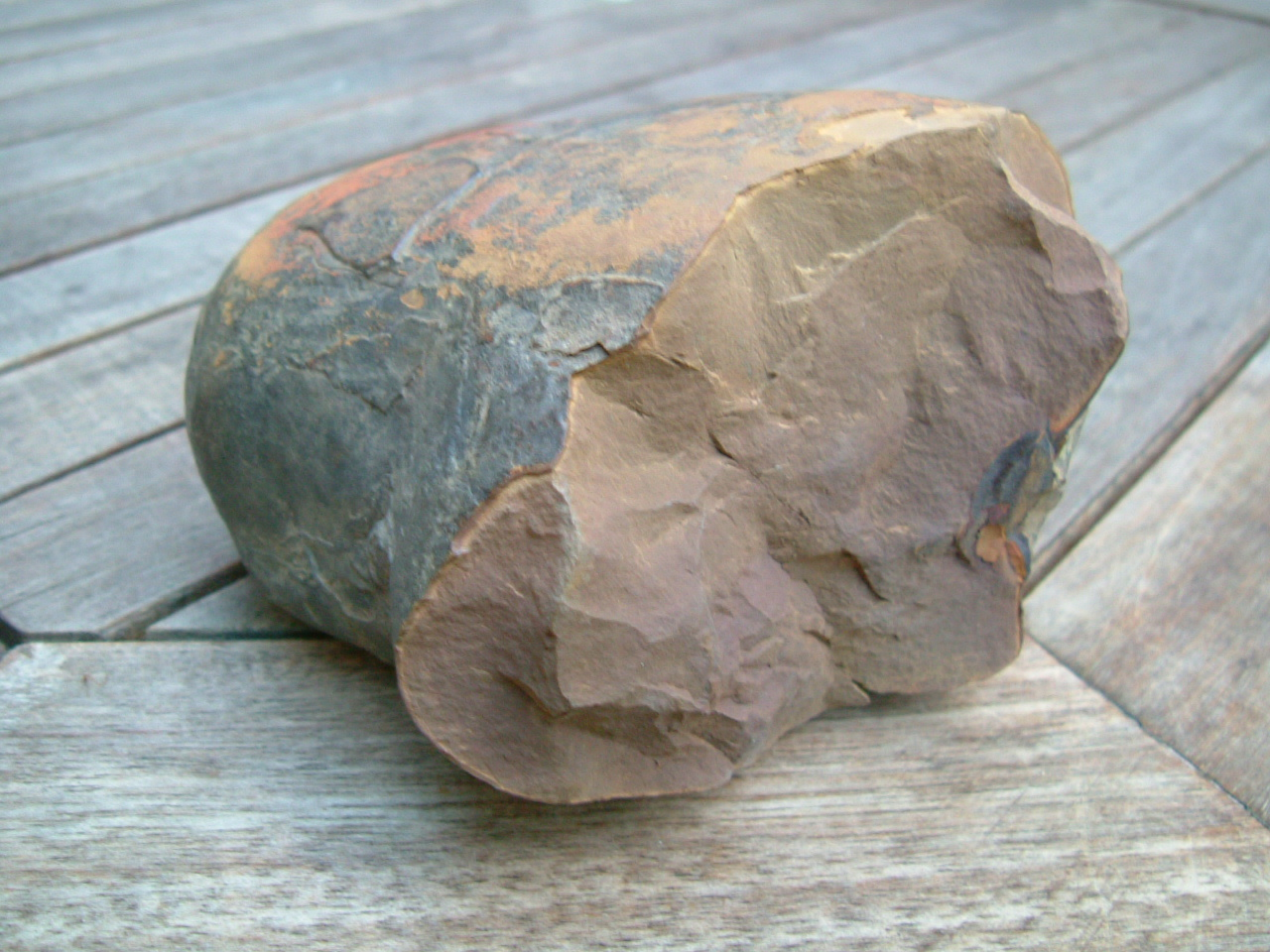
Siderite

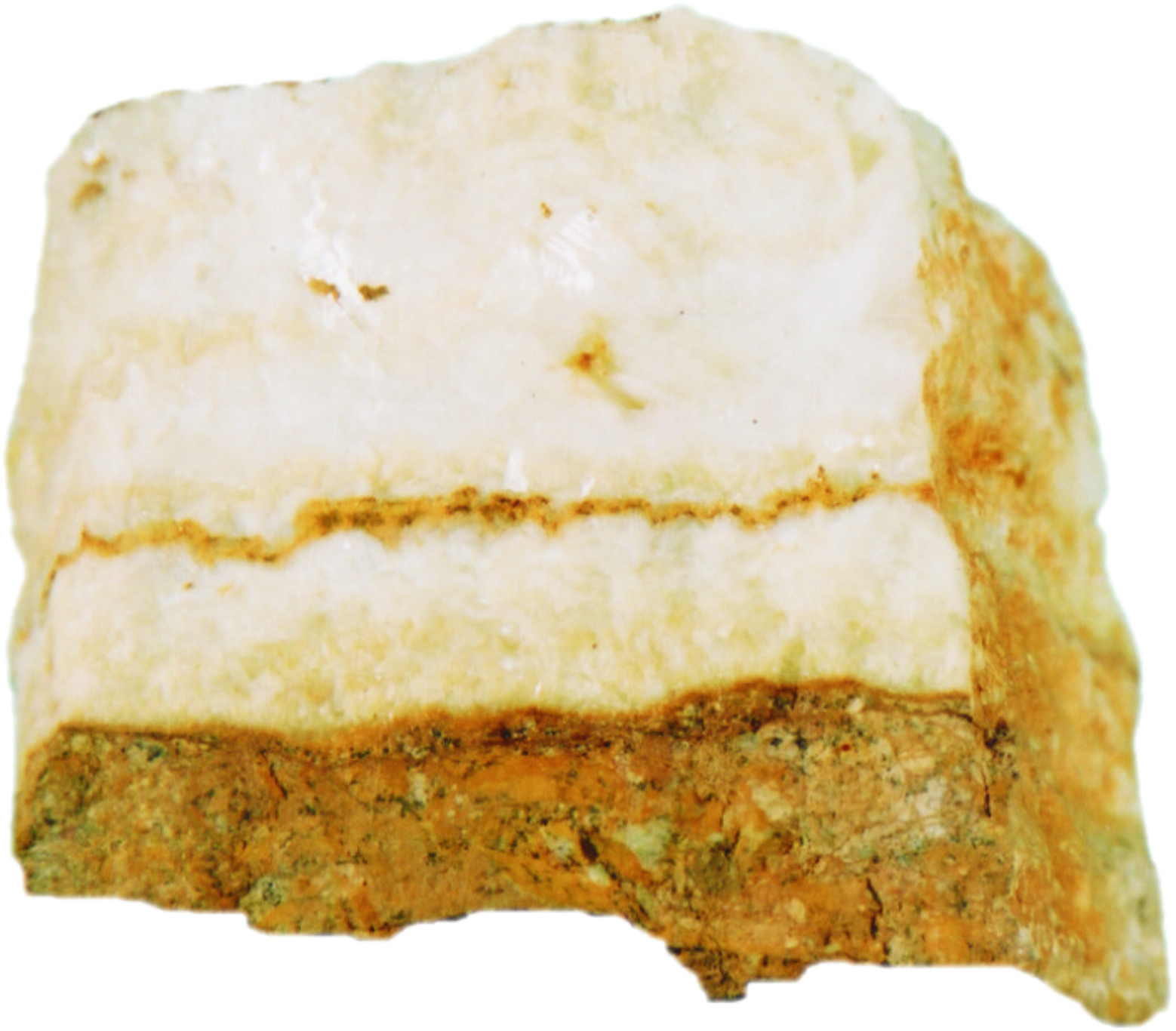
Ferrous magnesite

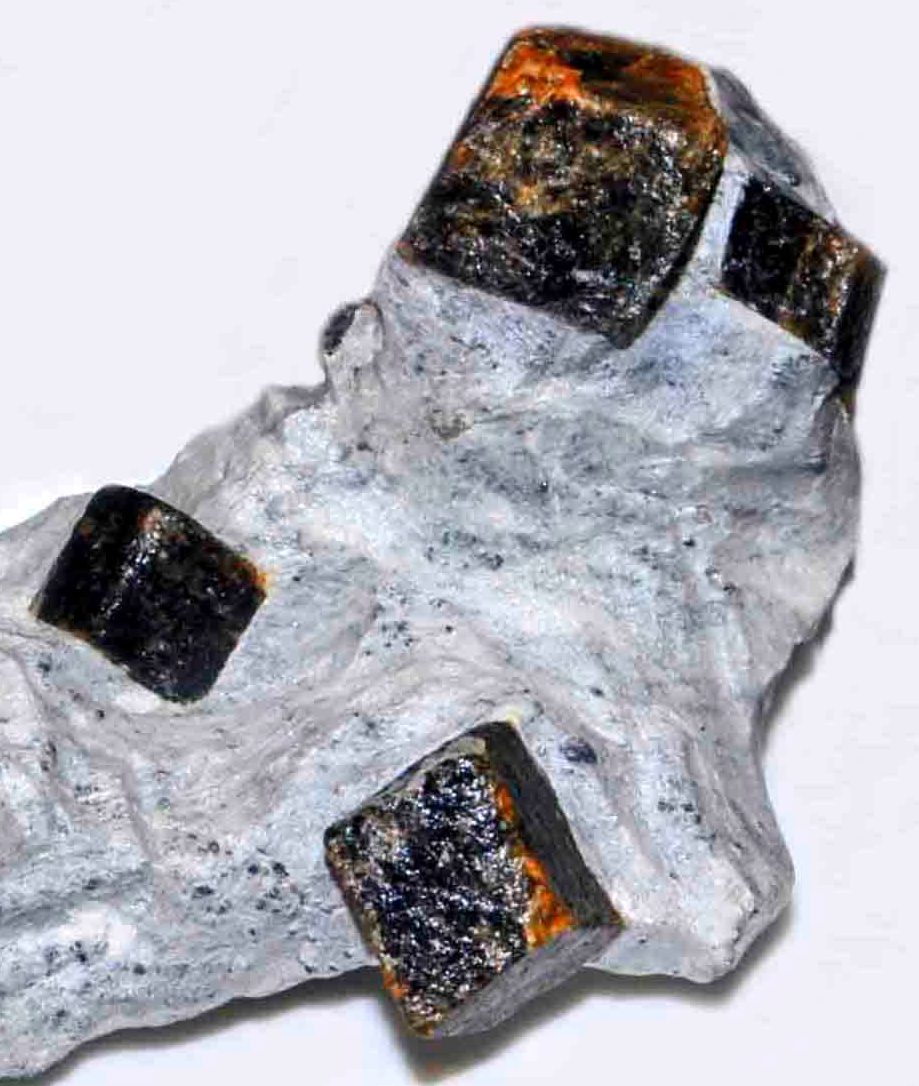
Breunnerite

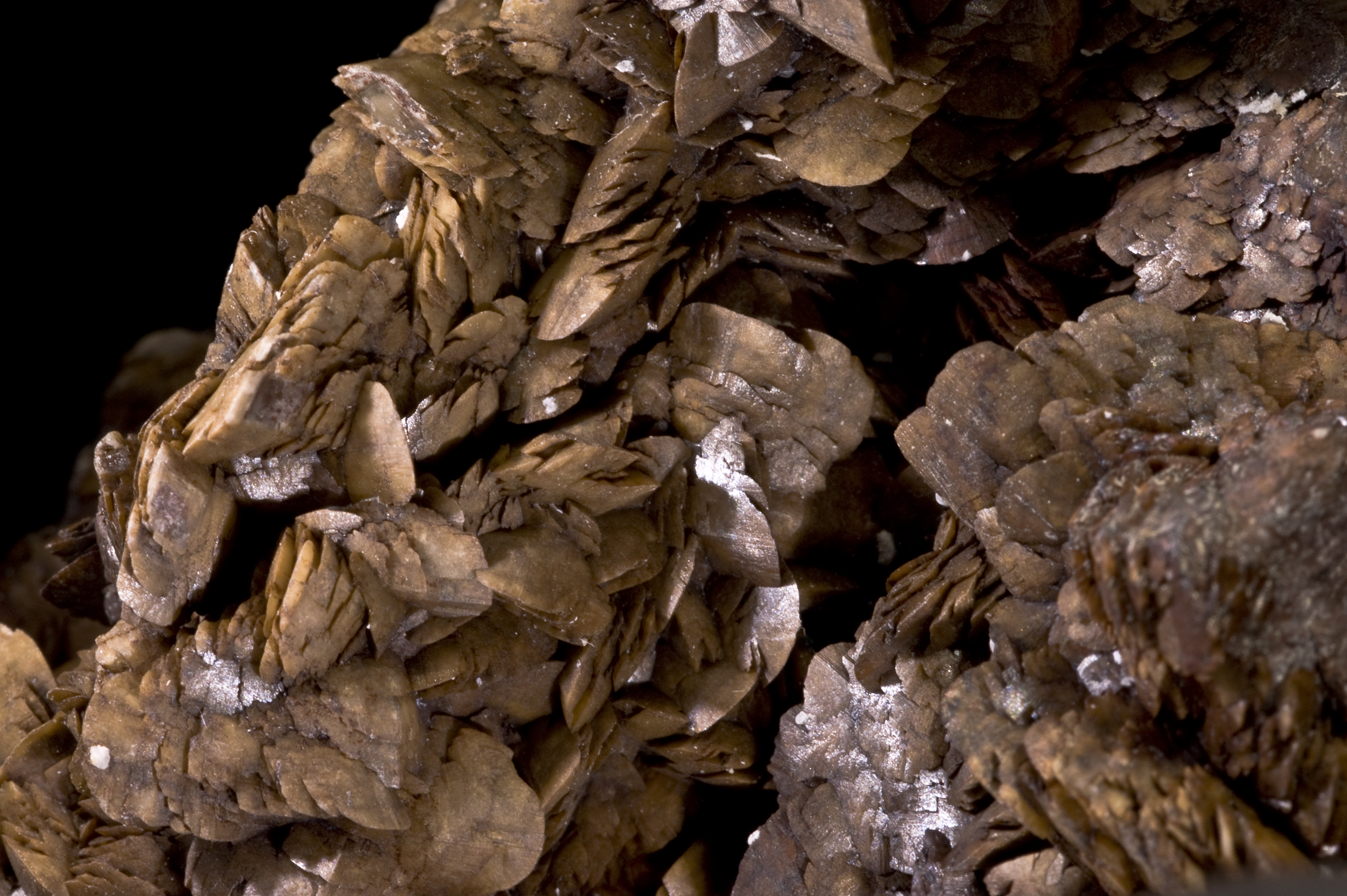
Mesitite

== See also ==
- Bitter spar
- Satin spar
- Feldspars
- Azure spar
- Moonstone
- Belomorite
- Albite
