= Bitter spar =

Secondary minerals of antimony oxide class

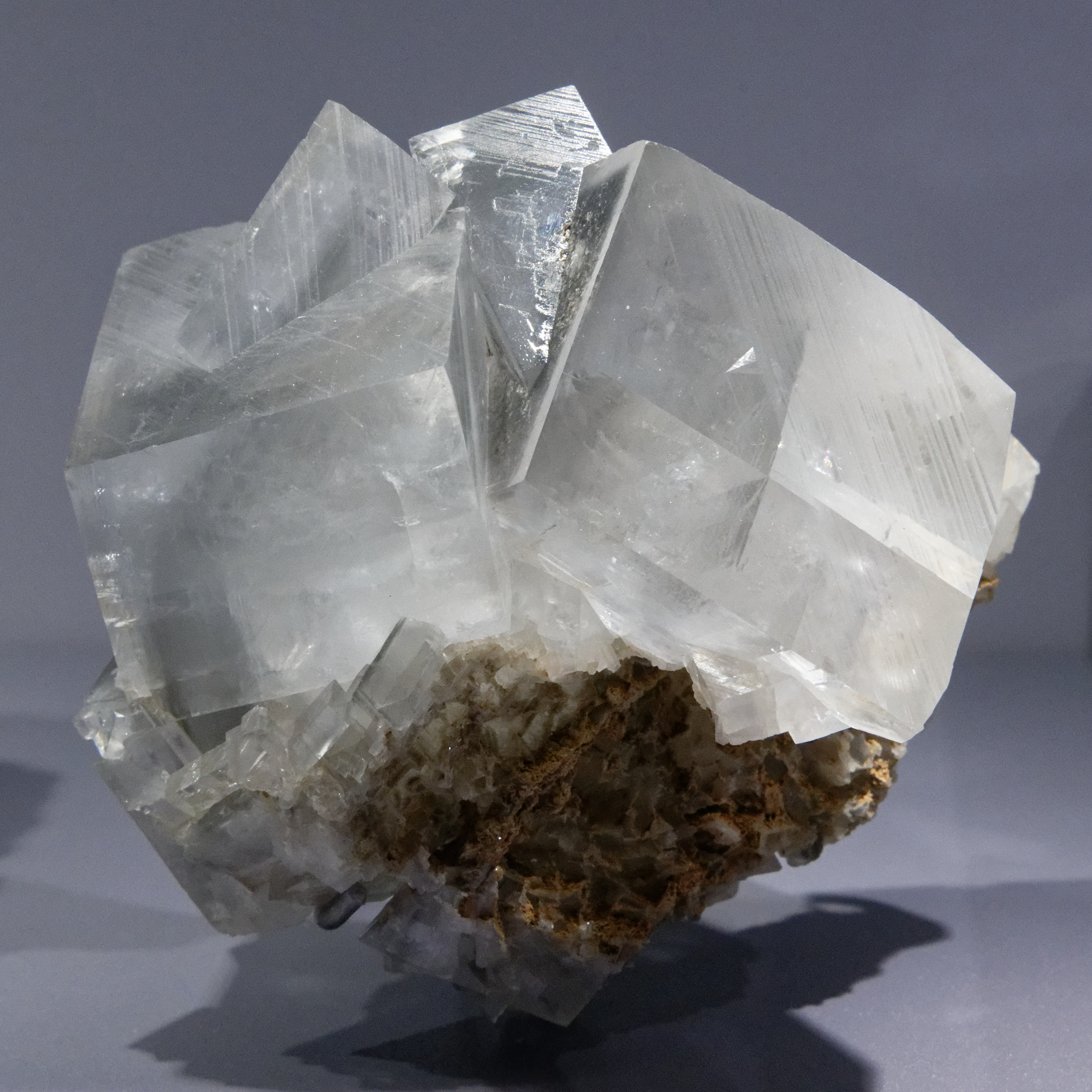
- Bitter spar (dolomite) from Spain

General
- Category: Minerals

Bitter spar or bitter-spar (German: Bitterspat, Rautenspat) is a trivial, partly obsolete name for at least two carbonate minerals that are relatively similar in composition: dolomite (with varieties) and magnesite (with varieties). The name bitterspar was given primarily due to its content of magnesium carbonate, MgCO_{3}, which is the basis for obtaining bitter (Epsom) salt or magnesia. There is also a popular belief that the name directly reflects the taste of the mineral: if you lick the crystals of this feldspar, they may seem bitter.

== History and properties ==
According to geochemical concepts that had formed by the end of the 18th century, bitter spar was considered a type of bitter limestone with an inconstant composition. For example, bitterspars from the Austrian Tyrol, according to the results of chemical analysis, contained 52% carbonate of lime, 45% carbonate of bitter earth and 3% carbonate of iron oxide, thus representing a mixed carbonate of magnesium and calcium with a noticeable content of coloring impurity of iron compounds. It has generally been noted that crystals of bitterspar, as a rule, have a rhombohedral shape and their properties generally correspond to those of calcite spar crystals, slightly surpassing them in hardness and resistance to acid attack. Bitterspars are most often found embedded in chlorites, Serpentinites, or talcs, where they are a typical hydrothermal mineral. Sometimes bitter feldspars are also found in cracks and voids of basalt massifs.

During the first third of the 19th century, the best-quality bitterspars were mined in Tyrol, around Salzburg, and in the St. Gotthard Pass mines. In the Miemo region of Tuscany, good-quality bitterspars were found as inclusions within gypsum blocks.

In the Urals, bitter spar was first discovered by Mohr in 1813 near the village of Rashkina, near the Polyakovsky mine, near the Verkhneyvinsky plant, and again in 1815 at the Berezovsky mines. It is widespread and is a common mineral in hydrothermal veins in serpentinites (Bazhenovo, Izumrudnye Kopi). In the Saranovsky massif, it occurs in veins up to 30 cm thick, with antigorite and in pseudomorphs after calcite. Quite good specimens have been repeatedly recovered from the southern Urals, from the banks of the Uya River, where bitterspar regularly forms veins in chlorites. Near the Miass plant, it is found in talc, where it has a radiating structure and was known in the 19th century as miascite. In Siberia, solid bitterspar mixed with chlorite grains forms bizarre translucent intergrowths and is called listvenite.

In many mineralogical sources from the 17th and 19th centuries, the traditional name bitterspar appears as a synonym or variety for all or some brown feldspars, which chemically represent minerals of the dolomite-magnesite series with coloring iron impurities, as well as manganese oxide. Specifically, in 19th-century literature, the name bitterspar regularly appears to refer to both brown spars in general and certain identified varieties, including even mesitite.

For example, in his student dissertation of 1856, Dmitri Mendeleev wrote about this fundamental mineralogical problem with all certainty:

...take any isomorphic minerals, for example, calcareous and bitter earth (Talkspath) feldspars; in them both the crystalline form and the rational chemical composition are similar, and we separate them because there is some constancy in the composition (the first is almost pure CaC, the second is sometimes even completely pure MgC...) There are up to 5 feldspars, standing in the middle either by chemical composition or by form. Brown or bitter feldspar represents a transition by both properties: its composition is generally nMgC + mCaC, and its rhombohedral angle = 106°15′20′′…

Attempts at more precise chemical analysis and the separation of concepts date back to the second half of the 19th century. Alexander Henry Green in a large work on geology intended for students and a wide range of readers interested in science, wrote:

We cannot say positively, therefore, whether the insoluble residue of the limestones operated on is a chemical com- pound or a mechanical mixture of the two carbonates. The insoluble portion has, however, the same composition as one of the forms of Bitter Spar, may therefore be looked upon as probably Bitter Spar. There is then, probably Bitter Spar; and, in speaking of it thus, we do not pronounce any opinion as to whether it is a chemical compound or not, for this is a point respecting Bitter Spar which is equally open to question. There is, then, probably, one form of magnesio-calcareous rock consisting of Bitter Spar and Carbonate of Lime. Other rocks of the same family contain, perhaps, no soluble portion, and consist essentially of Bitter Spar; and there may be others wholly soluble, consisting of Carbonate of Lime and Carbonate of Magnesia. If this be so, the following nomenclature may be usefully employed:

Dolomite, a rock consisting essentially of Bitter Spar.
Dolomiting Limestone, a rock which is essentially a mixture of Bitter Spar and Carbonate of Lime, or of Bitter Spar and Carbonate of Magnesia.
Magnesian Limestone, a rock which is essentially a mixture of Carbonate of Lime and Carbonate of Magnesia

== Main minerals and varieties ==
- Magnesite, or bitter spar in the clear-crystalline modification, is a mineral widely distributed in the earth′s crust from the class of carbonates with the chemical composition MgCO_{3}. Among the most common impurities found in magnesite are iron (Fe^{2+}) or manganese ions, which give the white or translucent mineral a cloudy reddish or brown color. In such cases, magnesite is more often known as brown spar.
- Dolomite, or bitter spar, is a mineral common in the earth's crust from the class of carbonates with the chemical composition CaCO_{3}•MgCO_{3}, varieties close to dolomite from the same isomorphic series, colored brown or dirty brown by iron and manganese impurities (ferriferous dolomite) can also be found under the name brown spar.
- Brown spars in general and mesitite (the best known of them) in particular, are a conventional collective name for at least two carbonate minerals that are relatively similar in composition: ankerite, and siderite, which in the mineralogical texts of the 18th and 19th centuries appear systematically under the name of bitter spar.

== Bitter spar gallery ==
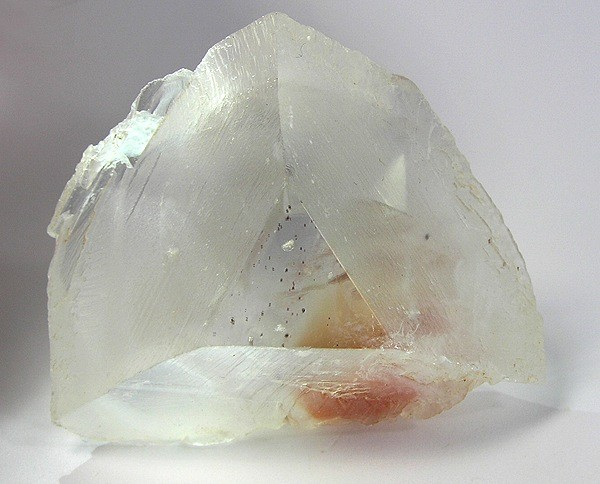
Dolomite

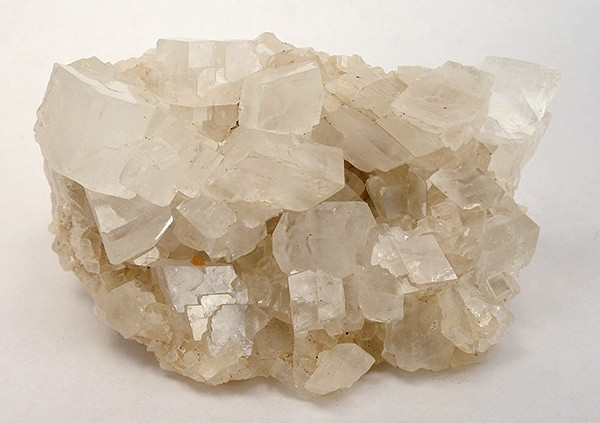
Magnesite

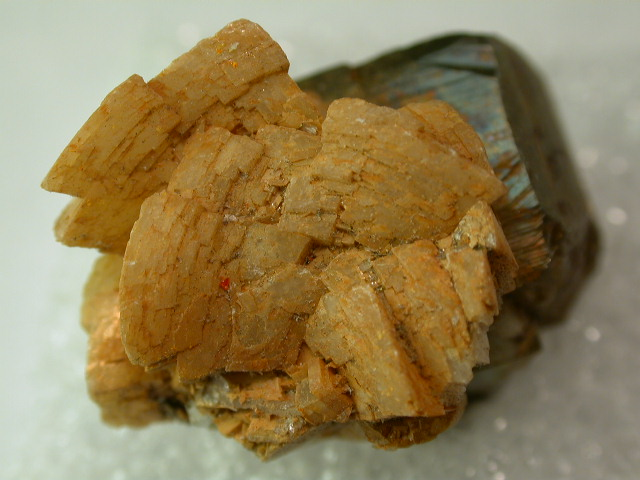
Brown spars

== See also ==
- Satin spar
- Feldspars
- Azure spar
- Moonstone
- Belomorite
- Albite
