= Mesitite =

Iron-bearing variety of magnesite

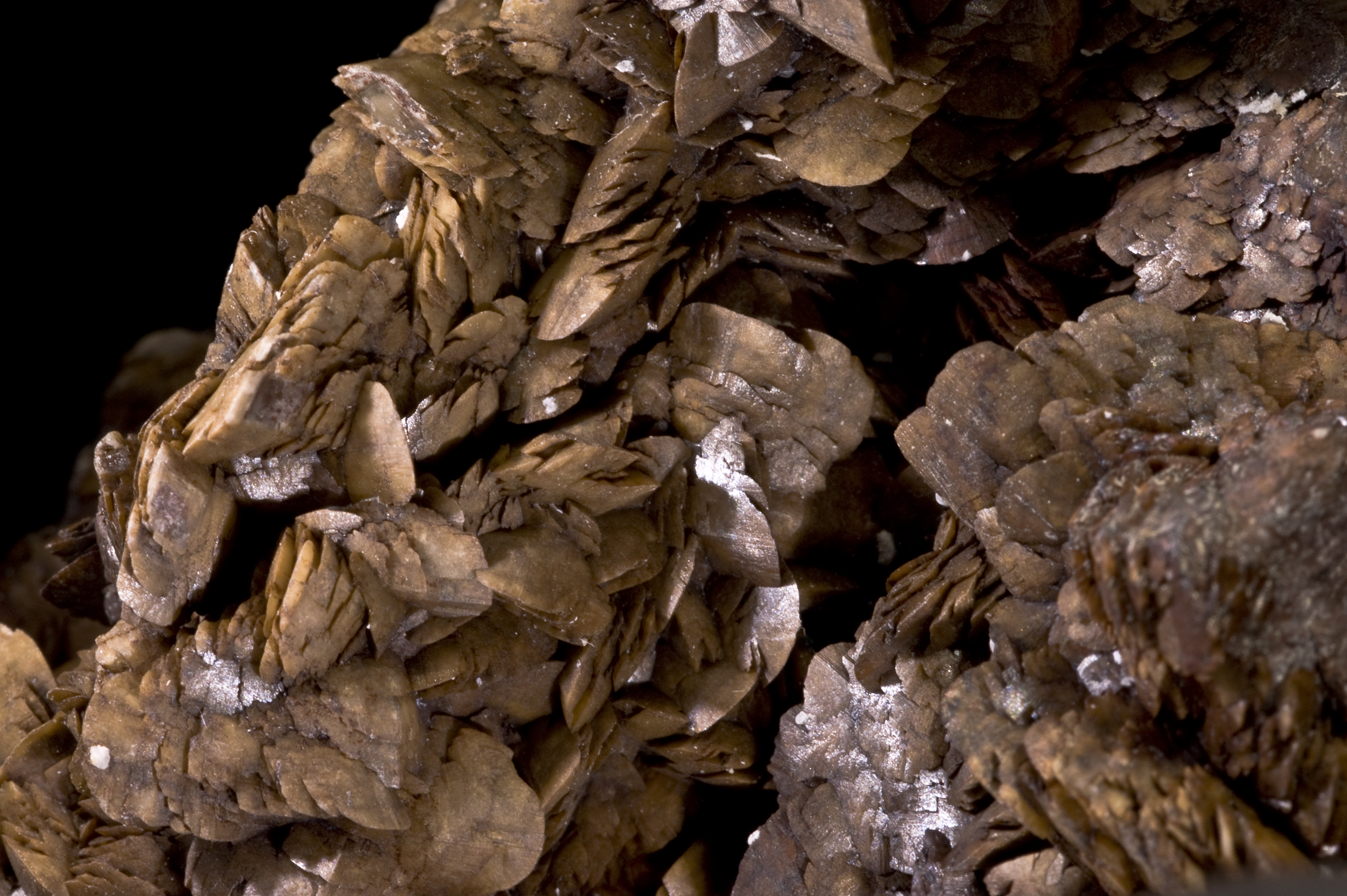
- Mesitite from Traversella (Piedmont)

General
- Category: Carbonate mineral
- Formula: (Mg,Fe)CO_{3}
- Crystal system: Trigonal

Identification
- Color: from whitish, gray or yellowish to gray-brown or brown
- Cleavage: perfect on a rhombohedron
- Mohs scale hardness: 4.0-4.5
- Luster: glassy or pearlescent
- Diaphaneity: translucent to opaque
- Density: 3.0-3.6 (calculated)

Mesitite (from Ancient Greek: μεσιτης — middle, between), formerly better known as mesitine spar, ferrous magnesite or brown spar is a variety of magnesite, a carbonate mineral, one of the so-called brown spars, regarded as an iron-bearing variety of magnesite or, in other cases, breunnerite. True to its name, mesitite is the middle member of a continuous isomorphic series magnesite—siderite with the general formula (Mg,Fe)CO_{3}, in which the iron ion content (Fe^{2+}) is approximately 30 to 50%, and the iron to magnesium ratio ranges, accordingly, from 30:70 to 50:50.

== Name and history ==
Mesitine spar, later abbreviated to mesitite in accordance with the internationally accepted terminology, less commonly mesitin (from German: mesitinspath) was an old trivial name, widely used among miners, geologists and mineralogists for some ferruginous magnesites. Until the end of the 19th century, various authors sometimes considered mesitine spar to be a synonym (variety) of breunnerite, in other cases — a synonym (variety) of pistomesite. In the most general form, mesitine was considered to be a brown spar, which in turn is a variety of bitter spar (in this case, more often magnesite), colored with manganese or iron carbonate.

The name itself simultaneously defined both the proportions of chemical compounds in its composition and the position of the mineral among related spars (the Greek word μεσιτης means middle, located in the middle). For example, in 1835, Vladimir Eremeev's German-Russian dictionary of technical terms and names defined mesitine spar as "forming a middle ground between brown spar and sparous iron ore". Although the definition of brown spar itself was broad, it concerned several different minerals and was not very clear.

Definitions in English mineralogy were distinguished by approximately the same precision. In particular, in 1853, James Dwight Dana described this mineral in his "Manual of Mineralogy" with the following words: "Mesitine spar. (Breunnerite). A carbonate of iron and manganese, occurring in yellowish rhombohedrons of 107°14′... This includes much of what is called rhomb spar, or brown spar, which becomes rusty on exposure."

Alexander Ramsay's definition, given a decade and a half later, turned out to be much more accurate: "Mesitine spar. (Mg:FeO)CO_{2}. Syn. Pistomesite. This species is composed of spathic iron ore, or chalybite and magnesite, frequently in equal proportions. The crystals are rhombohedrons with a terminal angle of 107°14′, having a grey or yellowish colour, a vitreous and slightly pearly lustre; a hardness of 4 to 4.5; a specific gravity of 3 (33,434) to 3.6 (40,140), and a transparency somewhat greater than that of chalybite. It is found in chlorite slate at St. Gothard, also in the Zillerthal, in the Tyrol, and in Piedmont".

In the last quarter of the 19th century, the conventional chemical formula of mesitite was 2MgCO_{3}·FeCO_{3}, which did not reflect the variable composition of these minerals.

Mineralogy of the 20th century came to define mesitite as the middle (median) member of a continuous isomorphic series of ferruginous magnesites (magnesite—siderite) with the general formula (Mg,Fe)CO_{3}, located in the middle in composition between breunnerite and pistomesite. Depending on the content of the FeCO_{3} molecule, four varieties are distinguished in this series. The first is breunnerite, in which the iron content is the lowest (up to 30%), and the properties are closest to magnesite; then comes mesitite, containing up to half of siderite (30-50% FeCO_{3}); the iron content is even higher in pistomesites (50-70% FeCO_{3}) and the last, closely adjacent to iron spar, is sideroplesite (70-95% FeCO_{3}).

Modern mineralogy divides iron-bearing magnesites into two approximately equal parts, in full accordance with the percentage content of iron carbonate (below and above 50%). Thus, breunnerite and mesitite are considered ferruginous varieties of magnesite, while sideroplesite and pistomesite, on the contrary, are magnesium-bearing varieties of siderite.

== Properties ==
In the 19th century, mesitin spar was often considered a variety of breunnerite, at that time the best known of the ferruginous magnesites. Likewise, in the first half of the 20th century, breunnerite remained the best known of all varieties, but it, too, never had the status of an independent mineral species.

In terms of composition, mesitine spar (included in an indefinite number of breunnerites) was represented as an isomorphic mixture of magnesia carbonate (magnesite) and iron carbonate (siderite) in various proportions; or MgCO_{3}, with an admixture of FeCO_{3}. For example, Dmitri Mendeleev in his master's thesis "Isomorphism in Connection with Other Relationships of Crystal Form to Composition" recommended depicting the formula of mesitine spar as (½Fe•½Mg)C or simply (MgFe)C. Another graphical version of the formula of mesitine spar was considered to be (Mg:FeO)CO_{2}.

The Soviet school of mineralogy often continued to traditionally classify the above-mentioned sideroplesite (70 to 95% FeCO_{3}), pistomesite and mesitite as varieties of breunnerite, nevertheless stipulating that "...breunnerite itself, the most common in nature, refers to varieties with a FeCO_{3} content of up to 30%."

In the early 1950s, luminescence studies were conducted in Russia on trigonal carbonates formed by mixed crystals of CaCO_{3} — MgCO_{3} (dolomite) with subsequent isovalent substitution of magnesium by iron, manganese, and sometimes zinc. Within the indicated isomorphic series, many mineral species and varieties were studied, revealing some regular changes in luminescent properties. Among the general properties, it was first revealed that iron impurity, present in the form of FeCO_{3} in mixed crystals, such as breunnerite (MgFe)CO_{3}, or isovalently substituting magnesium ions, causes a hard quenching effect. None of the studied minerals (breunnerite, ankerite, mesitite, including siderite) gave a luminescent effect in any of the types of radiation used.

== Deposits ==
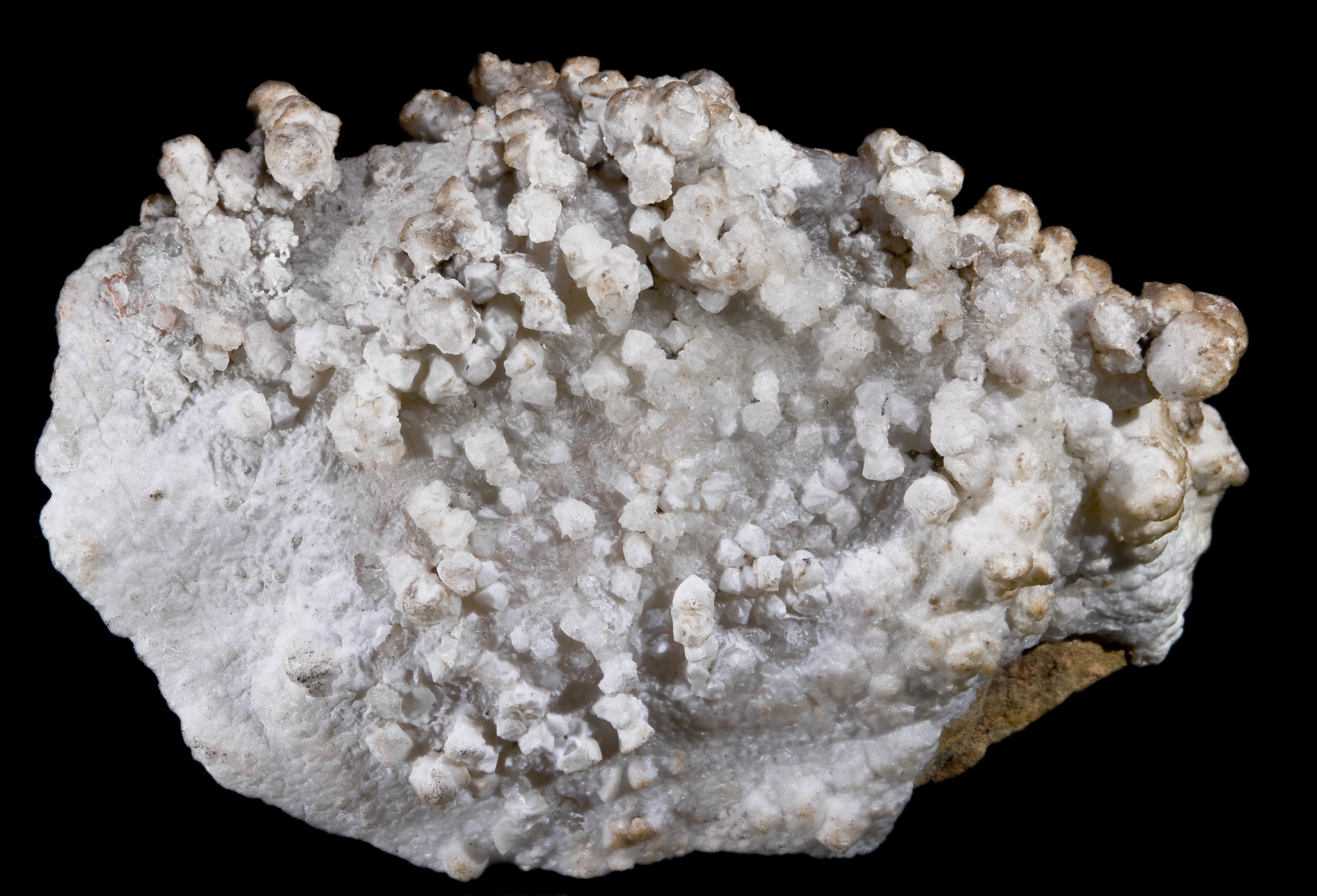
Mesitite (Saxony)

Mesitine spars are among the most widespread carbonate minerals, which is determined primarily by their composition. They have been found in all magnesite (carbonate) deposits that contain iron minerals (siderites) in one way or another. Traversella (Piedmont) has been considered the typical region from which reference samples of mesitine came since the beginning of the 19th century.

In the Russian Empire of the 19th century excellent museum samples of mesitine spar were found on the Nagolny Ridge (part of the Donetsk Ridge), as well as in the Nerchinsk District. One of the active mesitite deposits is located in the Magadan Region (the Engteri gold deposit, the Omsukchan Range area).

The largest number of modern mines with established mesitites are located in Western Australia, and Austria (Carinthia, Salzburg, Tyrol). In France, mesitite spars are known from the northeastern deposits of Grand Est, as well as in Occitania and Provence-Alpes region.

In the early 1920s, Edward Simpson described in some detail the occurrence of mesitites in Western Australia: "...mesitite occurs only as a granular constituent of highly ferruginous serpentines and peridotites which have suffered from deep seated carbonatation. Much of the socalled mesitite referred to in local geological literature is in reality breunnerite, the ferruginous variety of magnesite..." Until the mid-20th century, pistomesites were also often classified among the more well-known and widespread mesitites.

== See also ==
- Feldspars – other mineral series
