= Oligoclase =

Plagioclase feldspar with 70–90% albite

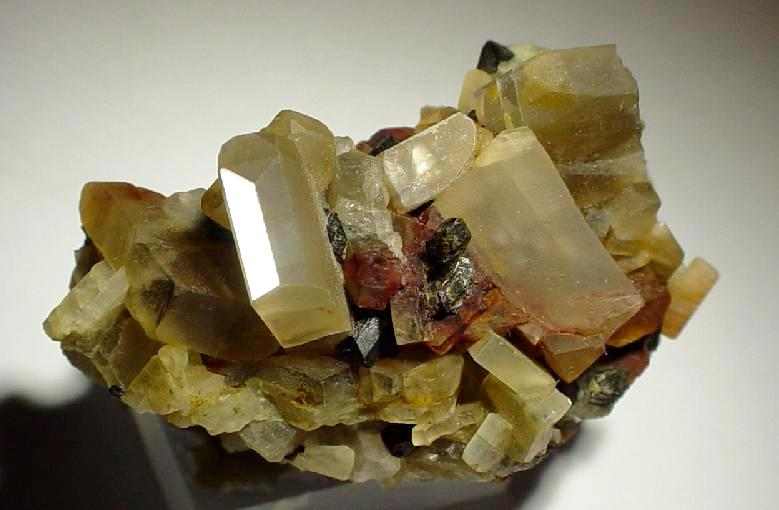
- Oligoclase from Chihuahua, Mexico

General
- Category: Tectosilicate minerals
- Group: Feldspar group
- Series: Plagioclase feldspar series
- Formula: (Ca,Na)(Al,Si)_{4}O_{8} (Na:Ca = 70:30 to 90:10)
- IMA status: Variety of albite
- Crystal system: Triclinic
- Crystal class: Pinacoidal (1̅)
- Space group: P1̅ (no. 2)

Identification
- Color: Usually white, with shades of grey, green, or red
- Cleavage: Perfect {001}, Good {010}, Poor {110}.
- Fracture: Uneven, sub-conchoidal
- Mohs scale hardness: 6 to 6.5
- Luster: Vitreous
- Streak: White
- Specific gravity: 2.64 to 2.66
- Refractive index: nα = 1.533–1.543; nβ = 1.537–1.548; nγ = 1.542–1.552
- Birefringence: 1st order

Oligoclase is a rock-forming mineral belonging to the plagioclase feldspars. In chemical composition and in its crystallographic and physical characters it is intermediate between albite (NaAlSi_{3}O_{8}) and anorthite (CaAl_{2}Si_{2}O_{8}). The albite:anorthite molar ratio of oligoclase ranges from 90:10 to 70:30.

Oligoclase is a high sodium feldspar crystallizing in the triclinic system. The Mohs hardness is 6 to 6.5 and the specific gravity is 2.64 to 2.66. The refractive indices are: nα = 1.533–1.543, nβ = 1.537–1.548, and nγ = 1.542–1.552. In color it is usually white, with shades of grey, green, or red.

Oligoclase is a common mineral in the more silica-rich varieties of igneous rock and in many metamorphic rocks.

== Name and discovery ==
The name oligoclase was given by August Breithaupt in 1826 from the Ancient Greek: όλίγος, romanized: oligos, little, and Ancient Greek: κλᾶν, romanized: klân, to break, because the mineral was thought to have a less perfect cleavage than albite. It had previously been recognized as a distinct species by J. J. Berzelius in 1824, and was named by him soda-spodumene (Natron-spodumen), because of its resemblance in appearance to spodumene.

== Occurrence ==
Perfectly colorless and transparent glassy material found at Bakersville, North Carolina has occasionally been faceted as a gemstone. Another variety more frequently used as a gemstone is the aventurine-feldspar or sun-stone found as reddish cleavage masses in gneiss at Tvedestrand Municipality in southern Norway; this presents a brilliant red to golden metallic glitter, due to the presence of numerous small scales of hematite oriented within the feldspar structure.

Oligoclase occurs, often accompanying orthoclase, as a constituent of plutonic igneous rocks such as granite, syenite, and diorite. It occurs in porphyry and diabase dikes and sills as well as in the volcanic rocks andesite and trachyte, and in mugearite where its presence is a defining feature. It also occurs in gneiss. The best developed and largest crystals are those found with orthoclase, quartz, epidote, and calcite in veins in granite at Arendal in Norway. The distinctive texture of rapakivi granite is due to oligoclase rims on orthoclase phenocrysts. Oligoclase is also found in metamorphic rocks formed under transitional greenschist to amphibolite facies conditions.

== Schiller iridescence ==
Some examples are called moonstone and show Schiller iridescence due to the presence of exsolution lamellae on cooling in the peristerite miscibility gap, ~An_{5}-An_{18}.

One of the iridescent varieties of oligoclase, discovered in 1925 near the White Sea coast by academician Alexander Fersman, became widely known under the trade name belomorite.

== Sources ==
- Hurlbut, Cornelius S.; Klein, Cornelis, 1985, Manual of Mineralogy, 20th ed., Wiley, ISBN 0-471-80580-7
