= Breunnerite =

Variety of magnesite

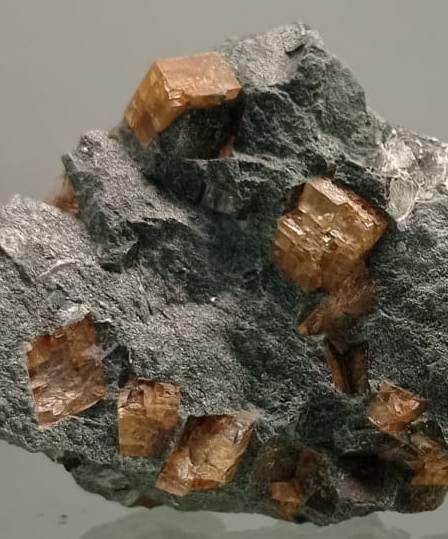
- Breunnerite from Bolzano. Italy

General
- Category: Carbonate mineral
- Formula: (Mg, Fe) CO _{3}
- Crystal system: Trigonal

Identification
- Color: from yellowish or gray-brown to brown
- Cleavage: perfect on a rhombohedron
- Mohs scale hardness: 4.0-4.5
- Luster: metallic
- Diaphaneity: translucent to opaque
- Density: 3.0-3.2 (calculated)

Breunnerite, also known as brown spar (German: braunspat) is a variety of magnesite, with a magnesium/iron ratio of 90/10 to 70/30.

== Name and history ==
It has been described by Wilhelm Karl Ritter von Haidinger in samples of Pfitsch pass, Zamsergrund and Großer Mt Greiner, Zemmgrund, two cities of the Ziller Valley, Tyrol, Austria.

Haidinger named the new variety of the magnesite in honor of Count August Breunner (sometimes the family name is written as Breuner; 1796-1877), a famous collector of minerals and fossils, as well as a high-ranking government official of Austria-Hungary.

In 19th-century mineralogy, as well as in mining and among geologists, breunnerite and its close analogues from the isomorphic series magnesite → siderite were more often known under the capacious morphological name ″brown spar″.

== Application ==
Breunerite is widely used in firing during the formation of raw materials for the subsequent production of refractories. When magnesium carbonate, which is part of breunerite, is brought to a temperature of about 600°C, it enters the firing process as a mineralizer, first decomposing and then reacting and forming two main compounds that act as raw materials: 2CaFe_{2}O_{3} и MgOFe_{2}O_{3}. Breunerite produces a less pure product than a mixture of magnesia and iron oxide, but is more economical to produce.
