= Matthias Joseph Anker =

Austrian mineralogist and geologist

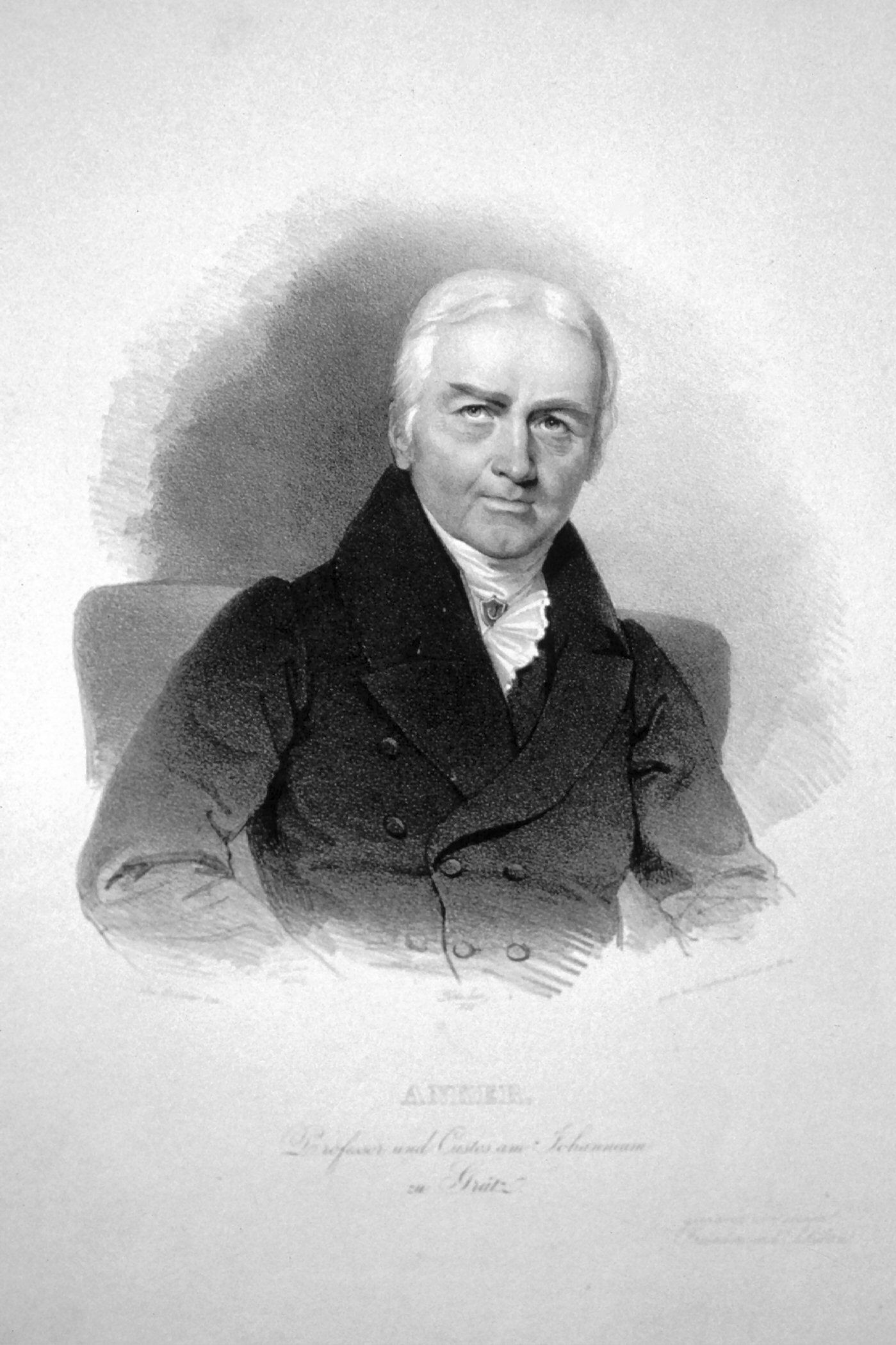
Matthias Joseph Anker.

Matthias Joseph Anker (6 May 1771 – 3 April 1843) was an Austrian mineralogist and geologist born in Graz. Some sources place his birthdate as 1 May 1772.

He received his education in Vienna, afterwards working as a surgeon in the town of Stainz. In 1807, he was called to Graz as a district surgeon, from where he intensified his scientific studies in mineralogy. Four years later, he joined the staff of mineralogist Friedrich Mohs at the Johanneum in Graz, where he eventually became a professor of mineralogy as well as curator of the mineral cabinet. In 1839, he resigned from his teaching position, but stayed on as director of collections.

In 1828/29, he supervised the creation of a catalog involving the mineral cabinet at the Johanneum, where in 1833 he reorganized the collection according to the Mohs system. Also, he is credited for providing the first geological map of Styria (1835).

In 1825, Wilhelm von Haidinger (1795–1871) named the mineral ankerite in his honor.

== Writings ==
- Kurze Darstellung einer Mineralogie von Steiermark (Outline of mineralogy in Styria), 1809
- Kurze Darstellung der mineralogisch-geognostischen Gebirgs-Verhältnisse der Steiermark (Outline of mineralogical-geognostic mountain conditions in Styria), 1835.
