= Ankerite =

Calcium, iron, magnesium, manganese carbonate mineral

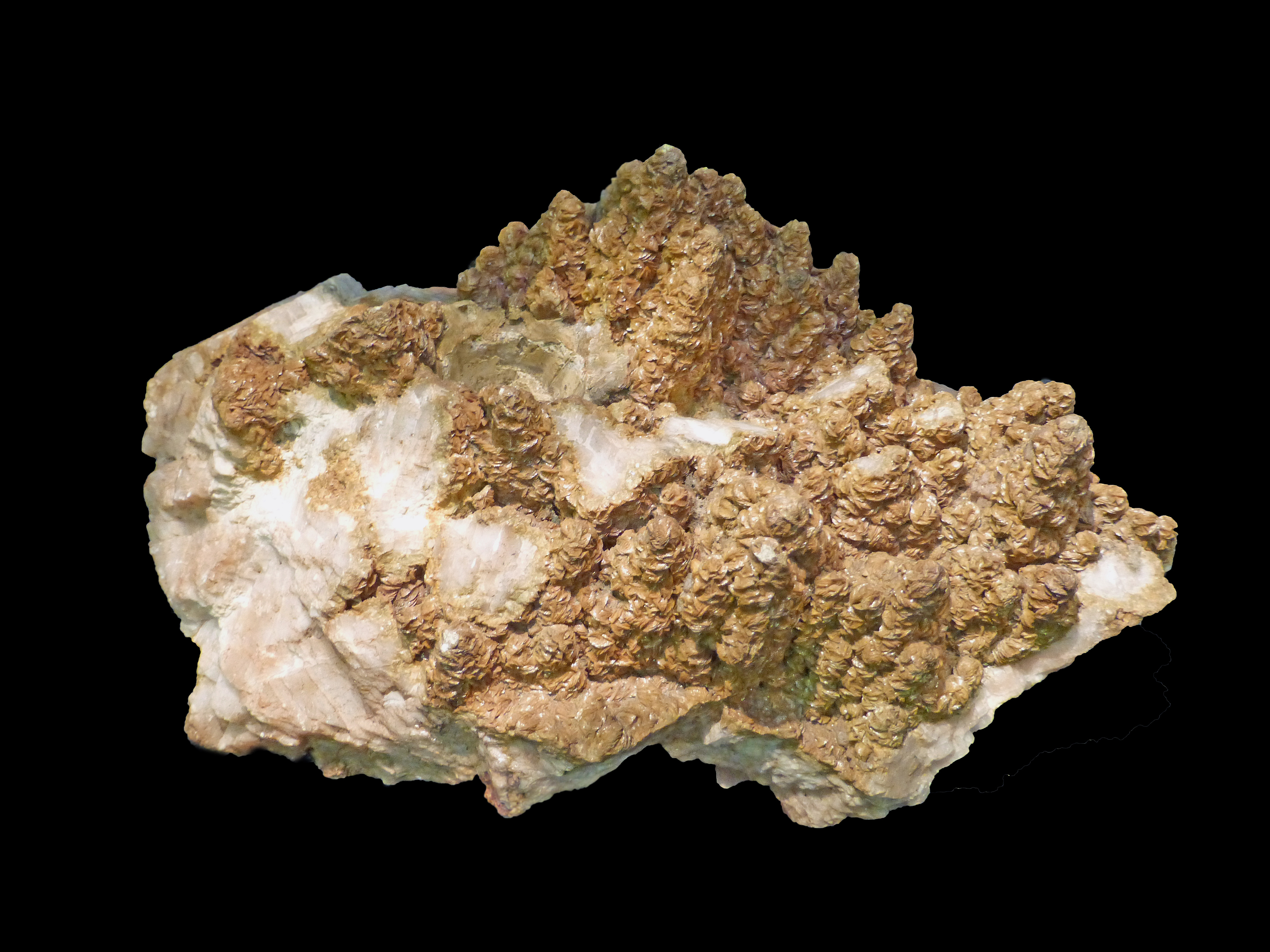

General
- Category: Carbonate mineral
- Formula: Ca(Fe,Mg,Mn)(CO_{3})_{2}
- IMA symbol: Ank
- Strunz classification: 5.AB.10
- Crystal system: Trigonal
- Crystal class: Rhombohedral (3̅); H–M symbol: (3̅)
- Space group: R3̅
- Unit cell: a = 4.8312(2) c = 16.1663(3) [Å]; Z = 3

Identification
- Color: Brown, yellow, white
- Crystal habit: Chrystals rhombohedral with curved faces; columnar, stalactitic, granular, massive
- Twinning: Simple t {0001}, {101̅0}. {112̅0}
- Cleavage: Perfect on {101̅1}
- Fracture: Subconchoidal
- Tenacity: Brittle
- Mohs scale hardness: 3.5–4.0
- Luster: Vitreous to pearly
- Streak: White
- Diaphaneity: Translucent to transparent
- Specific gravity: 2.93–3.10
- Optical properties: Uniaxial (−)
- Refractive index: n_{ω} = 1.690–1.750 n_{ε} = 1.510–1.548
- Birefringence: δ = 0.180–0.202
- Dispersion: Strong

Ankerite, also known as brown spar (German: braunspat) or bitter spar is a calcium, iron, magnesium, manganese carbonate mineral of the group of rhombohedral carbonates with the chemical formula Ca(Fe,Mg,Mn)(CO_{3})_{2}. In composition it is closely related to dolomite, but differs from this in having magnesium replaced by varying amounts of iron(II) and manganese. It forms a series with dolomite and kutnohorite.

== Name and history ==
It was first recognized as a distinct species by Wilhelm von Haidinger in 1825, and named for Matthias Joseph Anker (1771–1843) of Styria, an Austrian mineralogist.

In 19th-century mineralogy, as well as in mining and among geologists, ankerite and its close analogues from the dolomite series were more often known by the capacious, expansive name of ″brown spar″. This is partly because this mineral is the extreme (with the highest content of divalent iron ions) member of the dolomite-ankerite isomorphic series, as a result of which dirty-brown varieties of dolomite, contaminated with impurities, could also be encountered under the name of brown spar.

== Properties ==
The crystallographic and physical characters resemble those of dolomite and siderite. The angle between the perfect rhombohedral cleavages is 73° 48′, the hardness is 3.5 to 4, and the specific gravity is 2.9 to 3.1. The color is white, grey or reddish to yellowish brown.

== Genesis ==
Ankerite occurs with siderite in metamorphosed ironstones and sedimentary banded iron formations. It also occurs in carbonatites. In sediments it occurs as authigenic, diagenetic minerals and as a product of hydrothermal deposition. It is one of the minerals of the dolomite-siderite series, to which the terms brown-spar, pearl-spar and bitter-spar have been historically loosely applied.

It has been found in Western Tasmania, in mines in Dundas, Tasmania.

== Image gallery ==
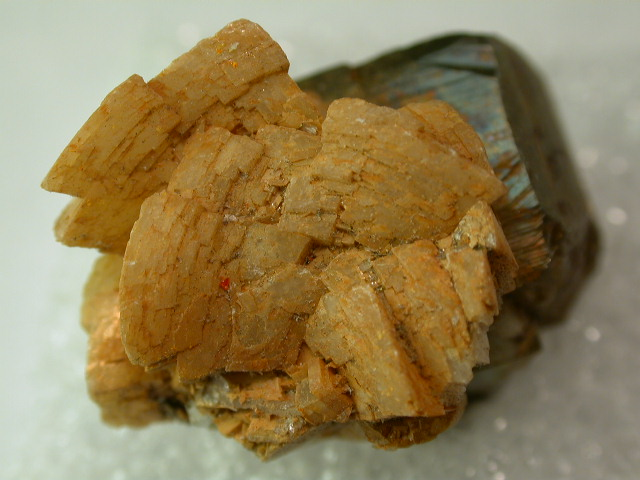
Ankerite on pyrite from King County, Washington

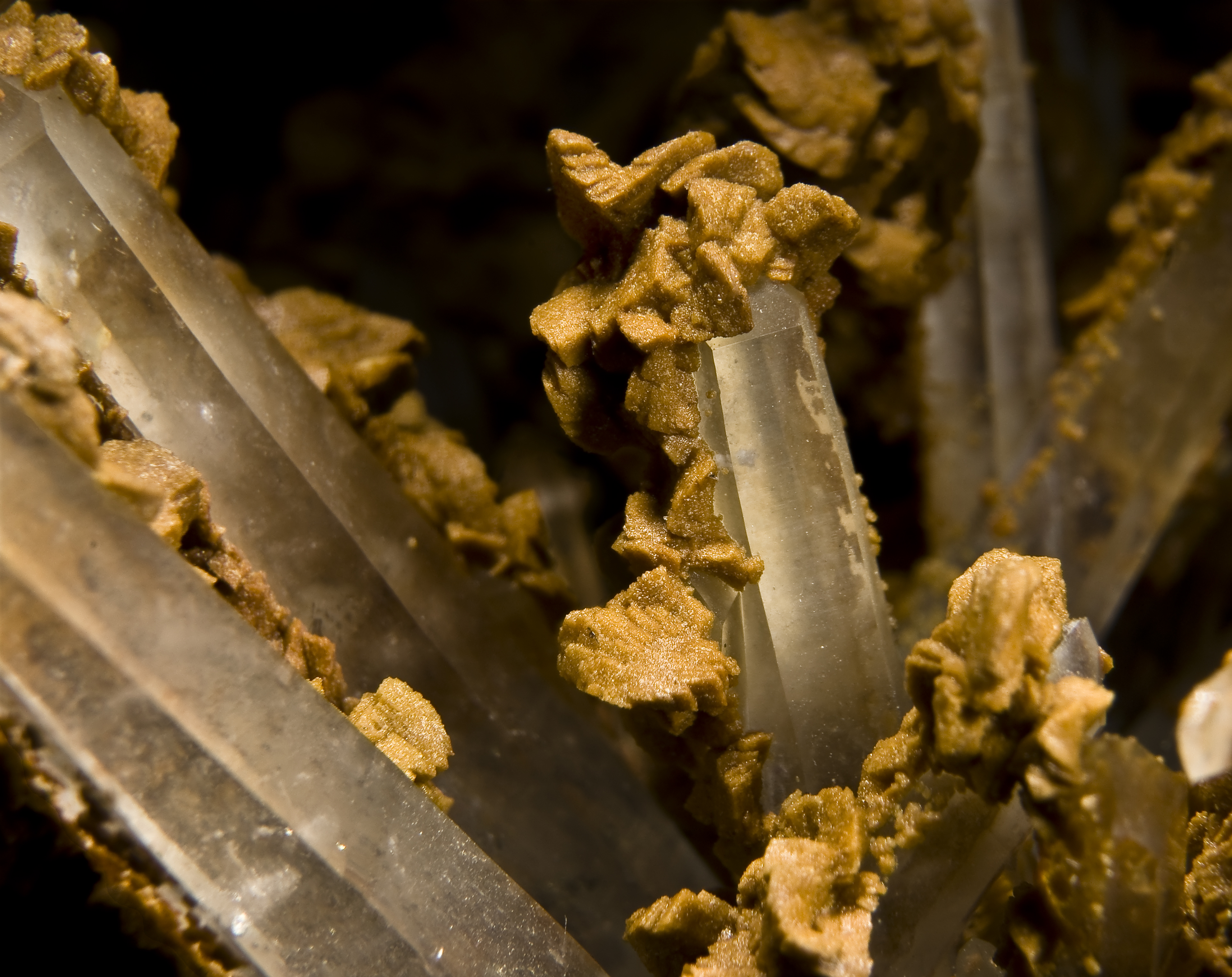
Ankerite on quartz from Peru

== See also ==
- List of minerals
- List of minerals named after people
