= Iron(II) carbonate =

Chemical, compound of iron carbon and oxygen

iron(II) carbonate

Names
- Other names ferrous carbonate

Identifiers
CAS Number	563-71-3
3D model (JSmol)	Interactive image
ChemSpider	10774
ECHA InfoCard	100.008.418
E number	E505 (acidity regulators, ...)
PubChem CID	11248
UNII	MZ3Q72U52O
CompTox Dashboard (EPA)	DTXSID8052225
- InChI: InChI=1S/CH2O3.Fe/c2-1(3)4;/h(H2,2,3,4);/q;+2/p-2 Key: RAQDACVRFCEPDA-UHFFFAOYSA-L
- SMILES: C(=O)([O-])[O-].[Fe+2]

Properties
Chemical formula	FeCO_{3}
Molar mass	115.854 g/mol
Appearance	white powder or crystals
Density	3.9 g/cm^{3}
Melting point	decomposes
Solubility in water	0.0067 g/L; K_{sp} = 1.28 × 10^{−11}
Solubility product (K_{sp})	3.13×10^{−11}
Magnetic susceptibility (χ)	+11,300·10^{−6} cm^{3}/mol

Structure
Crystal structure	Hexagonal scalenohedral / Trigonal (3̅2/m); Space group: R 3̅c, a = 4.6916 Å, c = 15.3796 Å
Coordination geometry	6

Related compounds
Other anions	iron(II) sulfate
Other cations	copper(II) carbonate, zinc carbonate
- Except where otherwise noted, data are given for materials in their standard state (at 25 °C [77 °F], 100 kPa). Infobox references

Iron(II) carbonate, or ferrous carbonate, is a chemical compound with formula FeCO_{3}, that occurs naturally as the mineral siderite. At ordinary ambient temperatures, it is a green-brown ionic solid consisting of iron(II) cations Fe^{2+} and carbonate anions CO^{2−}_{3}. The compound crystallizes in the same motif as calcium carbonate. In this motif, the carbonate dianion is nearly planar. Its three oxygen atoms each bind to two Fe(II) centers, such that the Fe has an octahedral coordination geometry.

== Properties ==
The dependency of the solubility in water with temperature was determined by Wei Sun and others to be

$$\log K_{\mathit{sp}} = -59.3498 - 0.041377 T - 2.1963/T + 24.5724 \log T  + 2.518 \sqrt{I} - 0.657 I,$$

where T is the absolute temperature in kelvins, and I is the ionic strength of the liquid.

Iron carbonate decomposes at about 500–600 °C (773–873 K).

== Preparation ==
Ferrous carbonate can be prepared by reacting solution of the two ions, such as iron(II) chloride and sodium carbonate:

FeCl_{2} + Na_{2}CO_{3} → FeCO_{3} + 2NaCl

Ferrous carbonate can be prepared also from solutions of an iron(II) salt, such as iron(II) perchlorate, with sodium bicarbonate, releasing carbon dioxide:

Fe(ClO_{4})_{2} + 2NaHCO_{3} → FeCO_{3} + 2NaClO_{4} + CO_{2} + H_{2}O

Sel and others used this reaction (but with FeCl_{2} instead of Fe(ClO_{4})_{2}) at 0.2 M to prepare amorphous FeCO_{3}.

Care must be taken to exclude oxygen O_{2} from the solutions, because the Fe^{2+} ion is easily oxidized to Fe^{3+}, especially at pH above 6.0.

Ferrous carbonate also forms directly on steel or iron surfaces exposed to solutions of carbon dioxide, forming an "iron carbonate" scale:

Fe + CO_{2} + H_{2}O → FeCO_{3} + H_{2}

== Uses ==
Ferrous carbonate has been used as an iron dietary supplement to treat anemia. It is noted to have very poor bioavailability in cats and dogs.

== Toxicity ==
Ferrous carbonate is slightly toxic; the probable oral lethal dose is between 0.5 and 5 g/kg (between 35 and 350 g for a 70 kg person).

== Iron(III) carbonate ==
Unlike iron(II) carbonate, iron(III) carbonate is rarely encountered. Attempts to produce iron(III) carbonate by the reaction of aqueous ferric ions and carbonate ions result in the production of iron(III) oxide with the release of carbon dioxide or bicarbonate. It is instead produced by the heating of iron(III) oxide at 2300 °C under 33 GPa of carbon dioxide. Iron(III) carbonate is unstable at atmospheric pressure, decomposing back into iron(III) oxide and carbon dioxide.
