= Moonstone (gemstone) =

Semi-precious gemstone

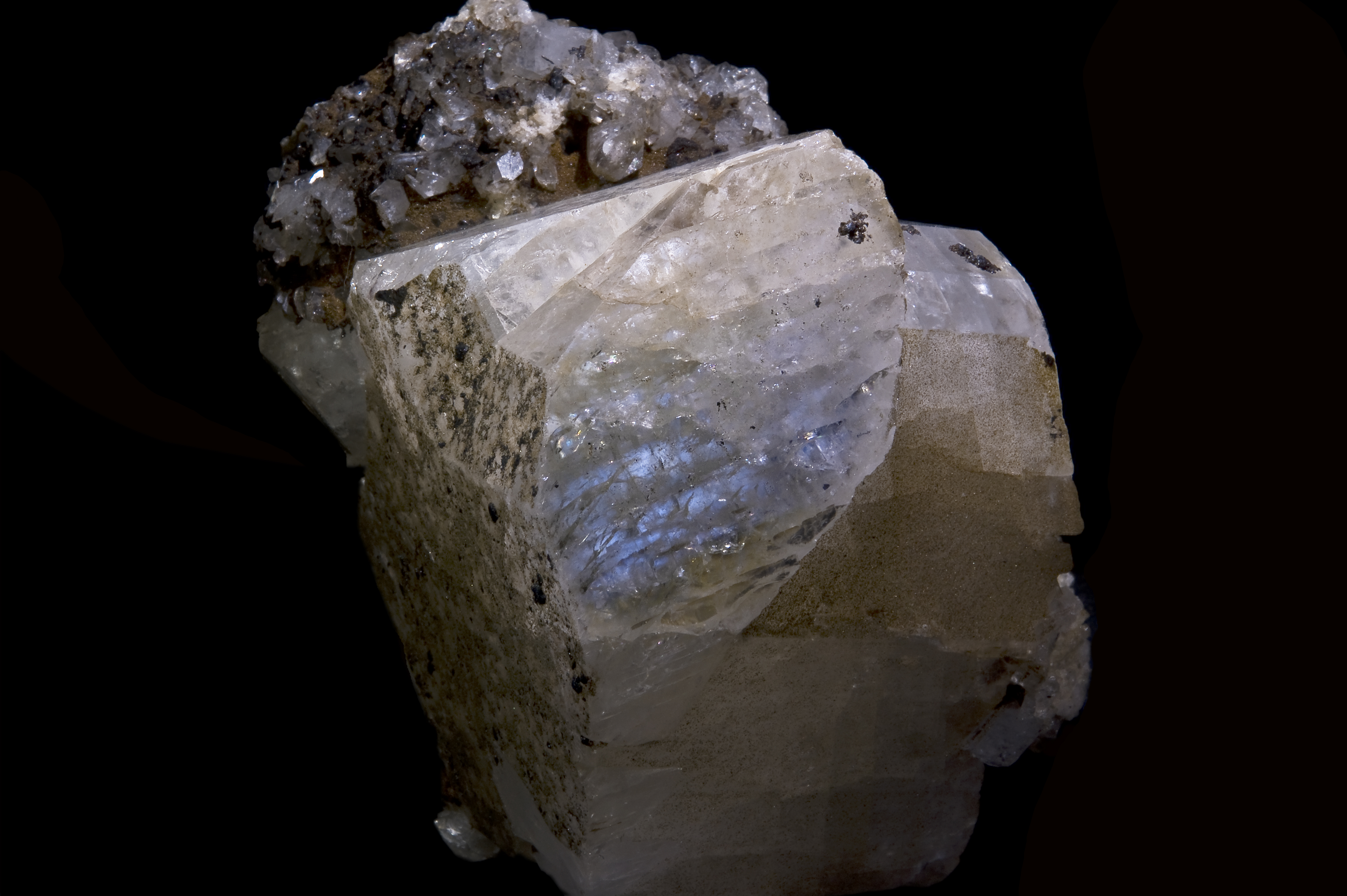

General
- Category: Tectosilicate minerals
- Group: Feldspar group
- Series: Alkali feldspar series
- Formula: (Na,K)AlSi_{3}O_{8}
- IMA status: Variety of orthoclase
- Crystal system: Monoclinic

Identification
- Color: Various, including blue, gray, white, pink, peach, green, and brown, as well as colorless
- Cleavage: Perfect
- Fracture: Uneven to conchoidal
- Mohs scale hardness: 6.0–6.5
- Luster: Vitreous, opalescent
- Streak: White
- Specific gravity: 2.54–2.66
- Optical properties: For orthoclase and sanidine, biaxial (–); for oligoclase, biaxial +/–
- Refractive index: 1.518–1.547
- Birefringence: 0.005–0.01
- Dispersion: 0.012

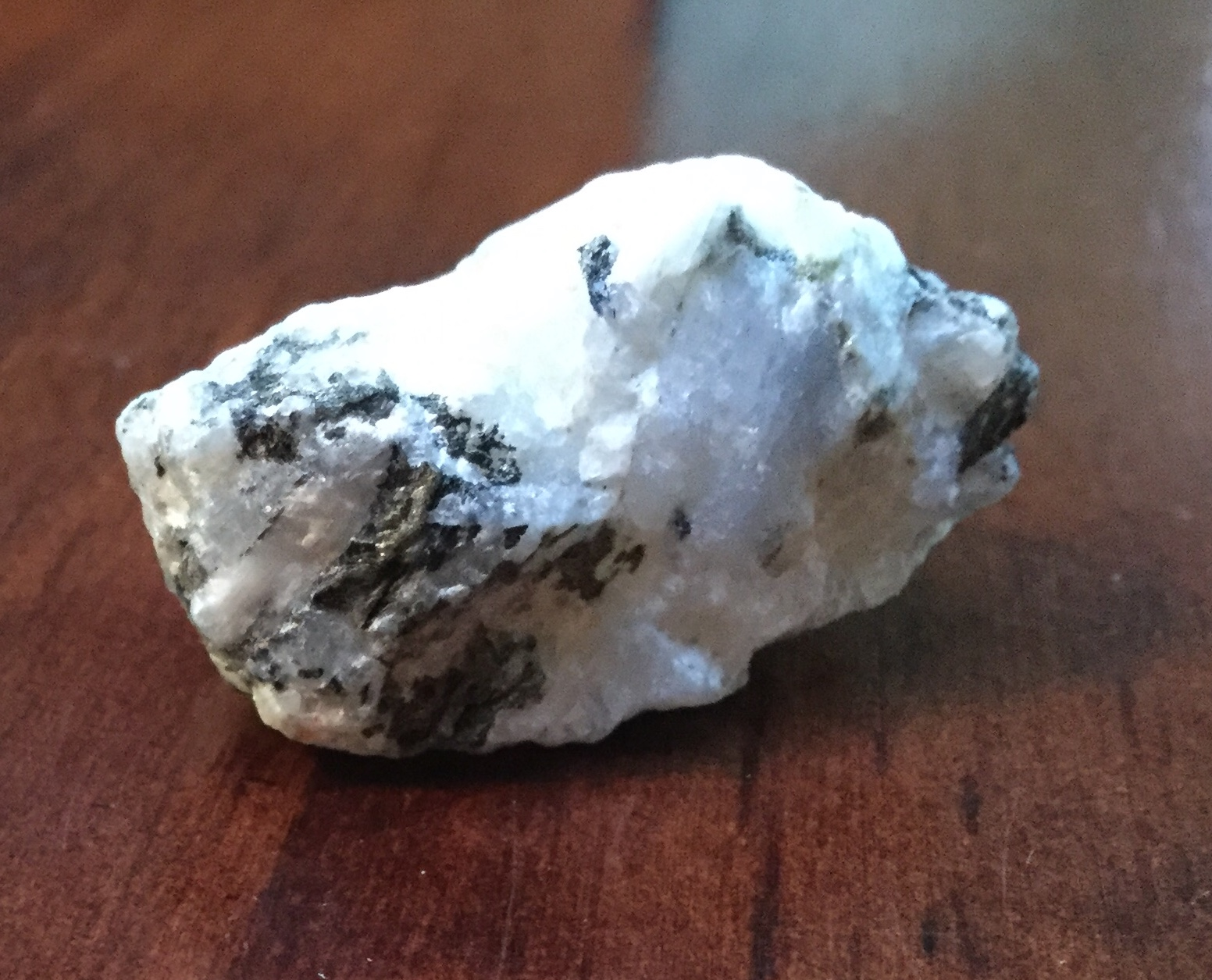
A small sample of rough moonstone

Moonstone is a sodium potassium aluminium silicate ((Na,K)AlSi_{3}O_{8}) of the feldspar group that displays a pearly and opalescent schiller. An alternative name for moonstone is hecatolite (from goddess Hecate).

== Etymology ==
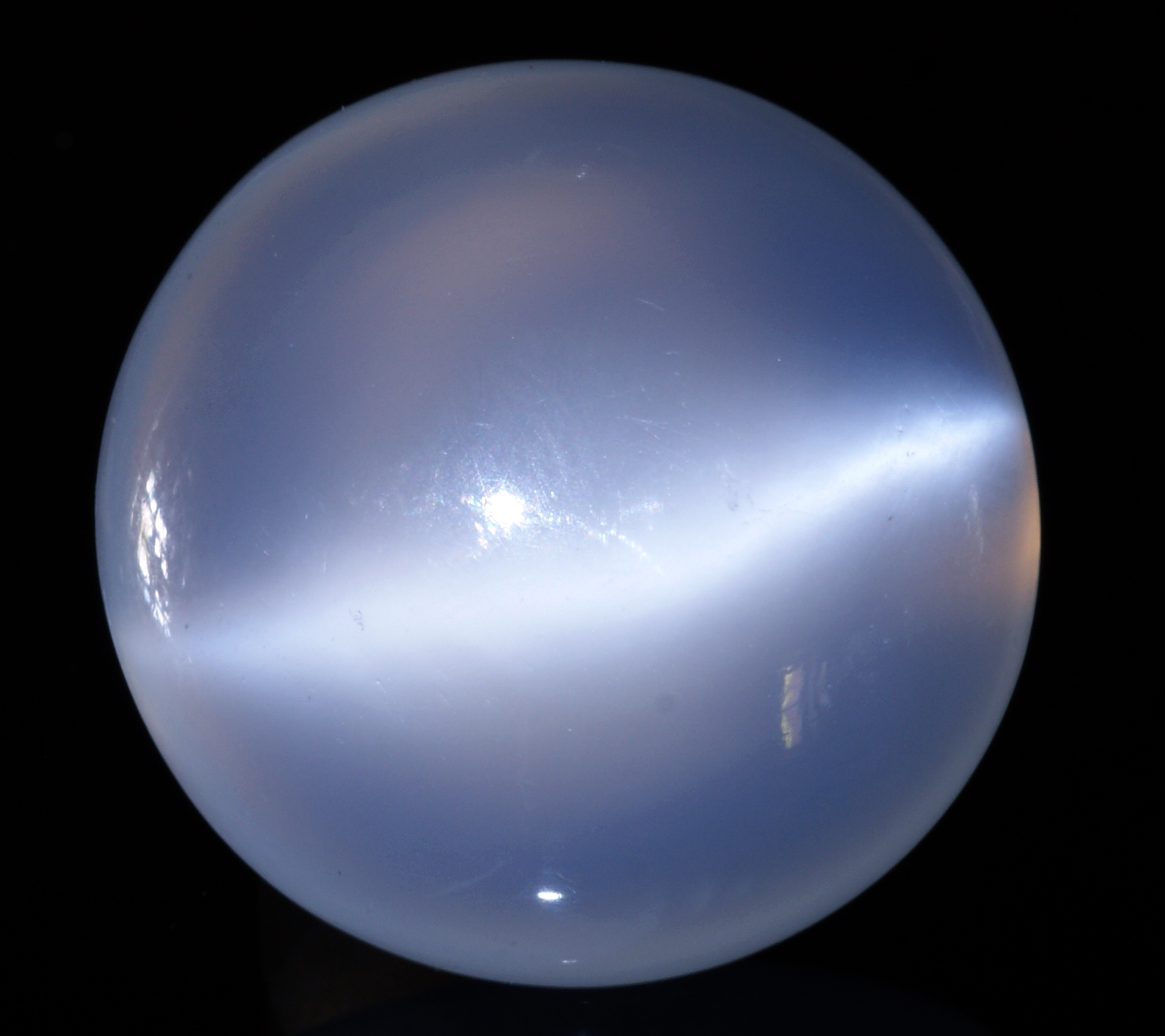
Moonstone polished en cabochon

The name moonstone derives from the stone's characteristic visual effect, called adularescence (or schiller), which produces a milky, bluish interior light. This effect is caused by light diffraction through alternating layers of orthoclase and albite within the stone. The diffracted light varies from white to blue, depending on the thinness of the albite layers. More technically, this micro-structure consists of regular exsolution layers (lamellae) of different alkali feldspars (orthoclase and sodium-rich plagioclase).

Polished moonstones often display chatoyancy ("cat's eye" effect), a luminous streak through the stone. Asterism is rare and produces four-legged stars.

== Geology ==
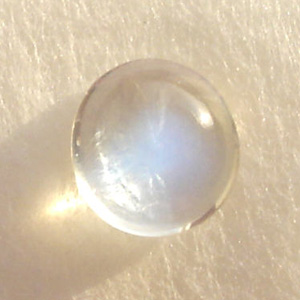
Moonstone cabochon

The most common moonstone is of the orthoclase feldspar mineral adularia, named for an early mining site near Mt. Adular in Switzerland, now the town of St. Gotthard. A solid solution of the plagioclase feldspar oligoclase +/− the potassium feldspar orthoclase also produces moonstone specimens.

Deposits of moonstone occur in Armenia (mainly from Lake Sevan), Australia, the Austrian Alps, Mexico, Madagascar, Myanmar, Norway, Poland, India, Sri Lanka, and the United States. Historically, the most valuable, transparent moonstones with strong blue sheen came from Myanmar. Today, most commercial moonstones come from Sri Lanka.

== Varieties ==
Moonstone is a type of feldspar that comes in several varieties. All moonstone varieties show adularescence, which creates a soft, flowing sheen that moves across the stone's surface. This effect results from light interference caused by alternating internal layers of albite and orthoclase feldspar.

Gemologists classify moonstone into several distinct varieties. Blue moonstone represents the finest variety of labradorite moonstone, with high transparency and strong blue adularescence. Blue moonstone can be found in Myanmar (formerly Burma), India, Madagascar, Malawi, Sri Lanka, and Tanzania. Labradorite moonstone belongs to the plagioclase feldspar group and forms within the triclinic crystal system, appearing in colorless, white, slight orange, or green varieties with a blue sheen. Orthoclase moonstone belongs to the monoclinic crystal system and displays a mystical white glow in colorless to white, orange, yellow, or brown hues. Gem enthusiasts often refer to adularescent labradorite with a multi-colored glow as "rainbow moonstone," which is colorless and highly transparent. Adularia, named after the Adular Mountains of Switzerland, forms in hydrothermal veins in mountainous regions as colorless to white, cream, pale yellow to pink, or reddish-brown, glassy, prismatic, twinned crystals that frequently display a white to blue sheen.

== In culture ==
Moonstone has been used in jewellery for millennia, including ancient civilizations. The Romans admired moonstone, as they believed it was derived from solidified rays of the Moon. Both the Romans and Greeks associated moonstone with their lunar deities. In more recent history, moonstone became popular during the Art Nouveau period; French goldsmith René Lalique and many others created a large quantity of jewellery using this stone.

The moonstone is the Florida State Gemstone; it was designated as such in 1970 to commemorate the Moon landings, which took off from Kennedy Space Center. However, it does not naturally occur in the state.

In Thailand, moonstone is known as Mukdahan, the same name as the northeastern province next to the river Mekong, Mukdahan. The name of the province comes from a folklore that a magical gemstone looked like a pearl floating above the Mekong in the area where the province is now located.

== See also ==
- Belomorite - moonstone
