= Belomorite =

Moonstone variety

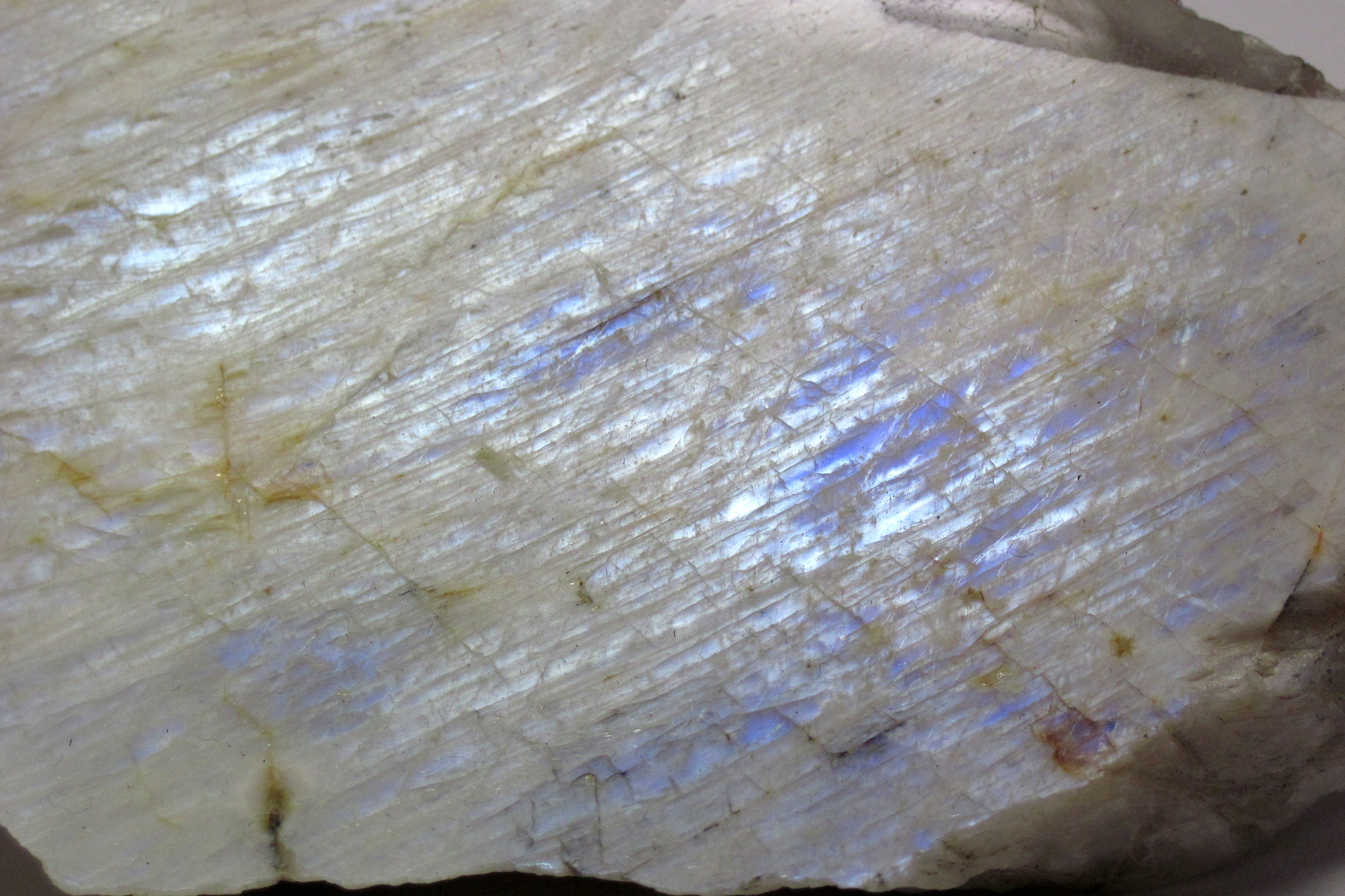
- Belomorite (Karelia, Chupinskaya Bay)

General
- Category: Plagioclase (peristerite)
- Formula: Na[AlSi_{3}O_{8}] or (Na,Ca)(Si,Al)_{4}O_{8}
- Crystal system: triclinic

Identification
- Color: light: white with a bluish tint, grayish, greenish
- Crystal habit: granular masses or massive aggregates
- Cleavage: perfect by {001}
- Fracture: uneven, conchoidal
- Tenacity: very brittle
- Mohs scale hardness: 6–6.5
- Luster: glass, pearl with iridescence
- Streak: white
- Diaphaneity: translucent to opaque
- Density: 2.64-2.66 (calculated)

Belomorite (Russian: беломорит), sometimes peristerite, moonstone, murchisonite, Ceylon opal, or hecatolite, is a decorative variety of albite (oligoclase) of white or light gray color with a distinct iridescence effect. By composition, belomorite belongs to the feldspar family; it is a sodium aluminosilicate from the plagioclase group, in most cases belonging to the isomorphic series albite (Ab) — anorthite (An) with an approximate percentage of 70Ab-30An.

The name “belomorite” was given to this variety of albite by academician Alexander Fersman in 1925, based on the location of its discovery near the shore of the White Sea (Russian: Белое море, romanized: Beloye more), and also, by association, for the similarity of iridescence colors with the shades of sea water. The best varieties of belomorite are translucent or transparent, they have a pearl-glass luster and iridescence in blue, gray-blue, violet-blue, greenish-blue or pale violet tones. The most famous deposits of this gem are in the north, in the pegmatites of the Kola Peninsula and Karelia.

Belomorite is a popular jewelry and ornamental material, one of the varieties of moonstone. However, due to its fragility and perfect cleavage, the mineral often breaks and is difficult to process, so it is cut in the form of simple cabochons (oval, round, teardrop-shaped), as well as balls or polished plates.

== History and name ==
A decade and a half after the discovery of this variety of albite near the White Sea coast, Alexander Fersman described the history of his “find” in sufficient detail and accurately in a short lyrical essay entitled “Belomorite.” Together with his companion, he got off the train at the Arctic Circle station in the Loukhsky District of the Republic of Karelia and they set off together towards the “Blue Pale” — that was the name of the mined-out vein of feldspars, located in the middle of a swampy area, between hills (in Karelian - varaks) almost on the very shore of the White Sea, about six kilometers east of the station.

There, in an old working, among dark amphibole shales, there was a snow-white vein of albite at least ten meters long, it rose to the top of the neighboring hill and went with lateral branches into the dark stone of shale rocks. Alexander Fersman sat down near a stack of feldspar, folded for transportation, looked at it carefully and, as he writes, could no longer look away, — in front of him was “a white, barely bluish stone, barely translucent, barely transparent, but clean and even, like a well-ironed tablecloth.”

The stone was split along individual shiny surfaces, and some mysterious light played on these edges. These were gentle bluish-green, barely noticeable iridescences, only occasionally they flashed with a reddish light, but usually a continuous mysterious moonlight flooded the entire stone, and this light came from somewhere from the depths of the stone — well, just like the Black Sea burns with blue light in autumn evenings near Sevastopol.

The delicate pattern of the stone from some thin stripes crossed it in several directions, as if imposing a mysterious lattice on the rays emanating from the depths. I collected, selected, admired and again turned the moonstone towards the sun.

— Alexander Fersman, “Memories of a Stone”, 1940

The stone found in an old mine was called “belomorite” — because, as Fersman explains, “The White Sea shimmered with the colors of moonstone... or did the stone reflect the pale blue depths of the White Sea?..” — Geologists took several samples to the Peterhof lapidary factory, recommending it as a new jewelry stone.

Meanwhile, the authors of the “new mineral” did not insist that they had made some kind of mineralogical discovery, noting that the decorative variety of stone received from them a new poetic name or even a trademark. On the one hand, Fersman directly writes that belomorite “was not born there, it was we who invented it there”; and on the other hand, he calls this variety of feldspar “true moonstone”.

It must be remembered that the coast and, more broadly speaking, the environs of the White Sea are by no means the only place where Fersmanovsky belomorite, which belongs to the class of perhaps the most common rock-forming minerals on earth, reveals itself. Deposits of this type of plagioclase, most often associated with mica-bearing and ceramic pegmatites, are located in other places in North Karelia (the vicinity of Khetolambina, Mica Bor), as well as in the south of the Kola Peninsula.

Another name for iridescent feldspar — peristerite — also comes from its geographical name (Peristeri — a mountain in western Greece). Other regional synonyms of belomorite are used even less frequently — murchisonite, Ceylon opal and jarisol, associated with the sites of finds. There are also names like hecatolite associated with the crystallographic orientation of the iridescence. All of them, one way or another, can be attributed to local territorial or commercial brands, one way or another connected with the trade in jewelry or ornaments made from iridescent albite.

== Properties ==
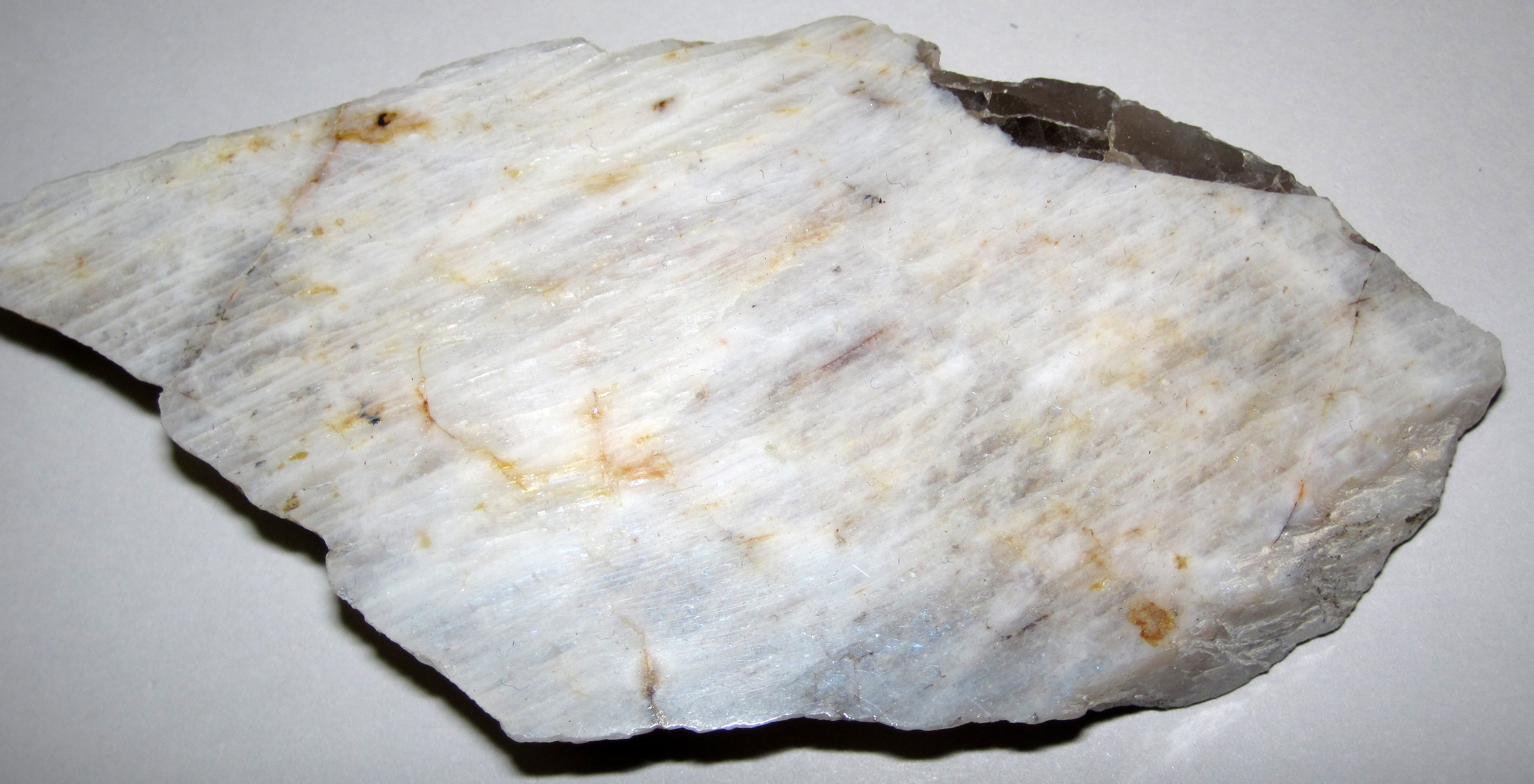
Belomorite (Chupa Bay, Karelia)

The reasons for the iridescence of belomorite have repeatedly been the subject of study, with generally consistent conclusions. Most researchers agreed that the bluish or greenish glow is associated with specific defects in the layered structure of the mineral. Alexander Fersman notes in his memoirs that the “mysterious light” emanating from the depths of the stone played precisely “on individual shiny surfaces,” lines of cleavage or fracture, naturally passing along the boundaries of the perfect cleavage of belomorite. This effect also appears much stronger and brighter after polishing the mineral.

The perfect cleavage of belomorite (peristerite) is manifested in its structure. The mineral consists of the thinnest (parallel) plates, almost invisible to the naked eye. Light, reflected from the internal cleavage planes, is refracted many times, which leads to spectacular color interference of light on spinodal decomposition structures commensurate with its wavelength. These properties of belomorite are by no means unique; their manifestations are characteristic of many minerals, collectively called “moon stones.” Also, other iridescent plagioclases, such as many labradorites, have a narrowly directed (within an approximate range of 15-20°) approximately along the b axis a colored iridescent reflection, most often manifested in beautiful blues and dark blues, less often in green, yellow or even reddish tones. Iridescence is a special type of pseudochromatism caused by the interference of light on spinodal decomposition structures commensurate with its wavelength. A similar effect is also occasionally typical for some potassium feldspars (orthoclases), anthophyllite, and quite often for enstatite and bronzite.

The characteristic optical effect of moonstones is most often called iridescence. However, the nature of their colored glow has a special specificity; it would be more accurate to call it adularescence (from the name of the titular mineral: adularia or moonstone). This effect is associated with the scattering of white light by very small submicroscopic point defects in the structure of the stone such as microperthite ingrowths, thin cleavage plates or spatial fluctuations in the internal composition. According to the Rayleigh scattering theory, short-wave radiation, other things being equal, is always scattered more strongly, and therefore the reflected and scattered light will have a bluer tint than the original one. In addition, belomorite sometimes exhibits weak orange luminescence in ultraviolet rays.

As a rule, belomorite forms solid granular and crystalline masses or massive crystalline aggregates; crystals of tabular and tabular-prismatic types are much less common. Complex polysynthetic twinning is very often observed.

== Mineral formation ==
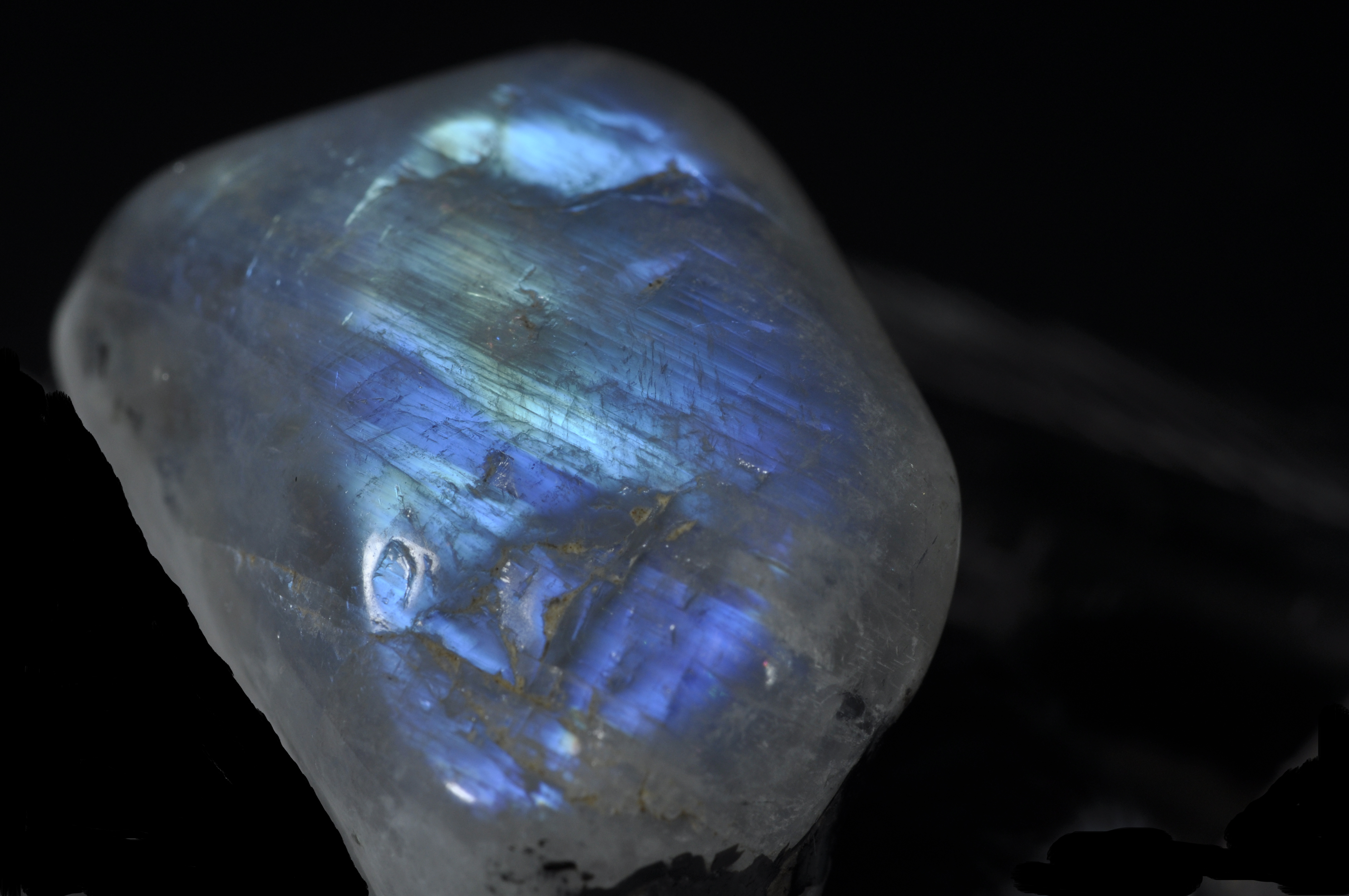
Ceylon «belomorite» («Ceylon opal»)

Belomorite is of igneous origin; it is part of many granites and granite pegmatites. Albites (oligoclases) are very widespread throughout the world and are among the most common rock-forming minerals. Iridescent regional varieties, which are quite similar in composition and properties to belomorite, are naturally less common, but it would be wrong to call them rare minerals. Plagioclases with moonlight have long been known in some pegmatite veins of Shaitanka and Lipovka (Middle Urals), as well as in Utochkina Pad near Ulan-Ude (Buryatia).

High-quality industrially significant belomorite, used in jewelry production, is mined mainly in Sri Lanka (most often called «Ceylon opal» there). Belomorites have also been found in large quantities in Madagascar, Tanzania, India, and the USA (California and Colorado). In addition, local deposits of iridescent albite are known in Australia, Austria, Germany, Italy, Kenya, Norway, Poland, Ukraine, as well as in France, Switzerland, Sweden and Japan.

Typical (title) deposits of belomorite are located in North Karelia, where this stone was discovered by Alexander Fersman, as well as in the south of the Kola Peninsula.

== Usage ==
Belomorite is a spectacular, inexpensive and popular ornamental stone; it is used in jewelry as one of the varieties of “moonstone”. It is typically cut into cabochons, often double-sided, convex in both directions, thus enhancing its brilliance, unlike, say, similar labradorite, which is often cut into flat plates cut parallel to the cleavage lines.

At the same time, the brittleness and perfect cleavage of belomorites serves as a natural obstacle in the process of their processing. As a result, the mineral often breaks and is difficult to produce, also for this reason it is most often cut in the form of simple cabochons (oval, round, teardrop-shaped), as well as balls, taking into account existing cracks and cleavage lines. Moonstones are at the top of the list in terms of the number of synthetic minerals (counterfeits) that enter the market under the guise of natural minerals. In addition to the brighter effect of iridescence, artificial minerals are not as fragile and vulnerable as their natural counterparts.

== See also ==
- Albite
- Oligoclase
- Plagioclase
- Feldspar
- Iceland spar
- Moonstone
