= Albite =

Sodium endmember of the plagioclase feldspar series

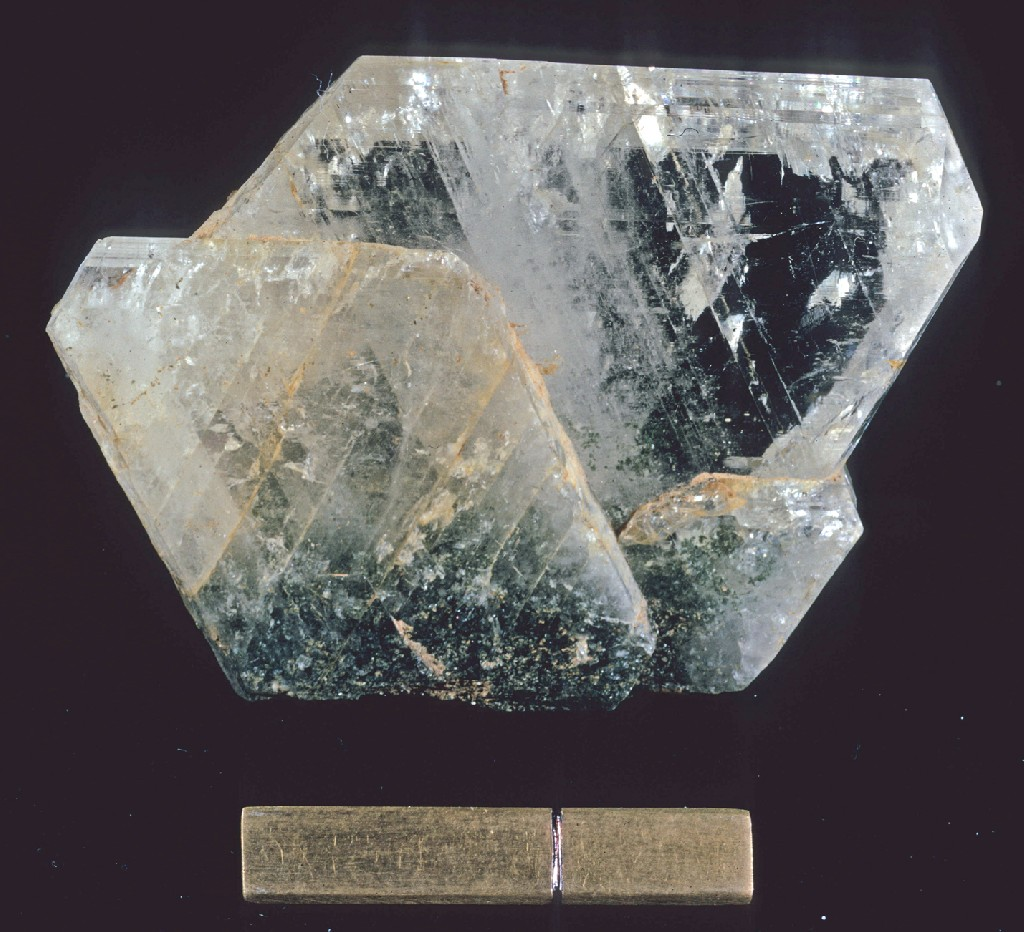
- Albite from Crete

General
- Category: Tectosilicate minerals
- Group: Feldspar group
- Series: Plagioclase feldspar series
- Formula: NaAlSi_{3}O_{8} (ideal endmember) (Na,Ca)AlSi_{3}O_{8} (Na:Ca = 100:0 to 90:10)
- IMA symbol: Ab
- IMA status: Grandfathered (1815)
- Strunz classification: 9.FA.35
- Dana classification: 76.1.3.1
- Crystal system: Triclinic
- Crystal class: Pinacoidal (1̅)
- Space group: C1̅ (no. 2)
- Unit cell: a = 8.16, b = 12.87; c = 7.11 [Å]; α = 93.45°; β = 116.4°, γ = 90.28°; Z = 4

Identification
- Color: White to gray, blueish, greenish, reddish; may be chatoyant
- Crystal habit: Crystals commonly tabular, divergent aggregates, granular, cleavable massive
- Twinning: Common giving polysynthetic striae on {001} or {010} also contact, simple and multiple
- Cleavage: Perfect on {001}, very good on {010}, imperfect on {110}
- Fracture: Uneven to conchoidal
- Tenacity: Brittle
- Mohs scale hardness: 6–6.5
- Luster: Vitreous, typically pearly on cleavages
- Streak: White
- Diaphaneity: Transparent to translucent
- Specific gravity: 2.60–2.65
- Optical properties: Biaxial (+)
- Refractive index: n_{α} = 1.528–1.533; n_{β} = 1.532–1.537; n_{γ} = 1.538–1.542
- Birefringence: δ = 0.010
- 2V angle: 85–90° (low); 52–54° (high)
- Dispersion: r < v weak
- Melting point: 1,100–1,120 °C (2,010–2,050 °F)
- Other characteristics: Low- and high-temperature structural modifications are recognized

Albite is a plagioclase feldspar mineral. It is the sodium endmember of the plagioclase solid solution series. It represents a plagioclase with less than 10% anorthite content. The pure albite endmember has the formula NaAlSi_{3}O_{8}. It is a tectosilicate. Its color is usually pure white, hence its name from Latin, albus. It is a common constituent in felsic rocks.

== Properties ==
Albite crystallizes with triclinic pinacoidal forms. Its specific gravity is about 2.62 and it has a Mohs hardness of 6 to 6.5. Albite almost always exhibits crystal twinning often as minute parallel striations on the crystal face. Albite often occurs as fine parallel segregations alternating with pink microcline in perthite as a result of exolution on cooling.

There are two variants of albite, which are referred to as 'low albite' and 'high albite'; the latter is also known as 'analbite'. Although both variants are triclinic, they differ in the volume of their unit cell, which is slightly larger for the 'high' form. The 'high' form can be produced from the 'low' form by heating above 750 °C (1,380 °F) High albite can be found in meteor impact craters such as in Winslow, Arizona. Upon further heating to more than 1,050 °C (1,920 °F) the crystal symmetry changes from triclinic to monoclinic; this variant is also known as 'monalbite'. Albite melts at 1,100–1,120 °C (2,010–2,050 °F).

Oftentimes, potassium can replace the sodium characteristic in albite at amounts of up to 10%. When this is exceeded the mineral is then considered to be anorthoclase.

== Occurrence ==
It occurs in granitic and pegmatite masses (often as the variety cleavelandite), in some hydrothermal vein deposits, and forms part of the typical greenschist metamorphic facies for rocks of originally basaltic composition. Minerals that albite is often considered associated with in occurrence include biotite, hornblende, orthoclase, muscovite and quartz.

== Discovery ==
Albite was first reported in 1815 for an occurrence in Finnbo, Falun, Dalarna, Sweden.

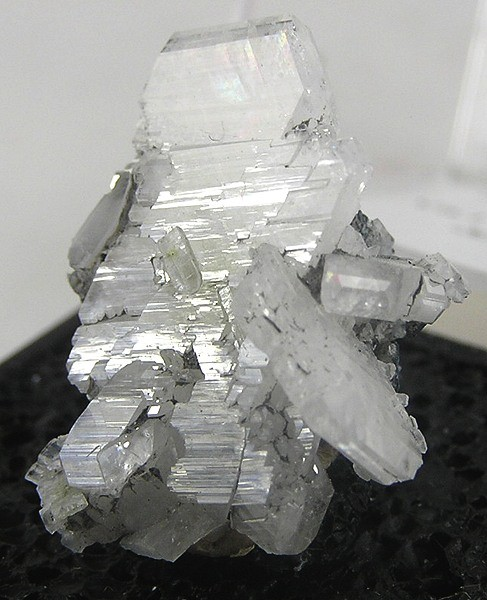
Albite from Italy

== Use ==
Albite is used as a gemstone, albeit semiprecious. Albite is also used by geologists as it is identified as an important rock forming mineral. There is some industrial use for the mineral such as the manufacture of glass and ceramics.

One of the iridescent varieties of albite, discovered in 1925 near the White Sea coast by academician Alexander Fersman, became widely known under the trade name belomorite.
