= Siderite =

Mineral composed of iron(II) carbonate

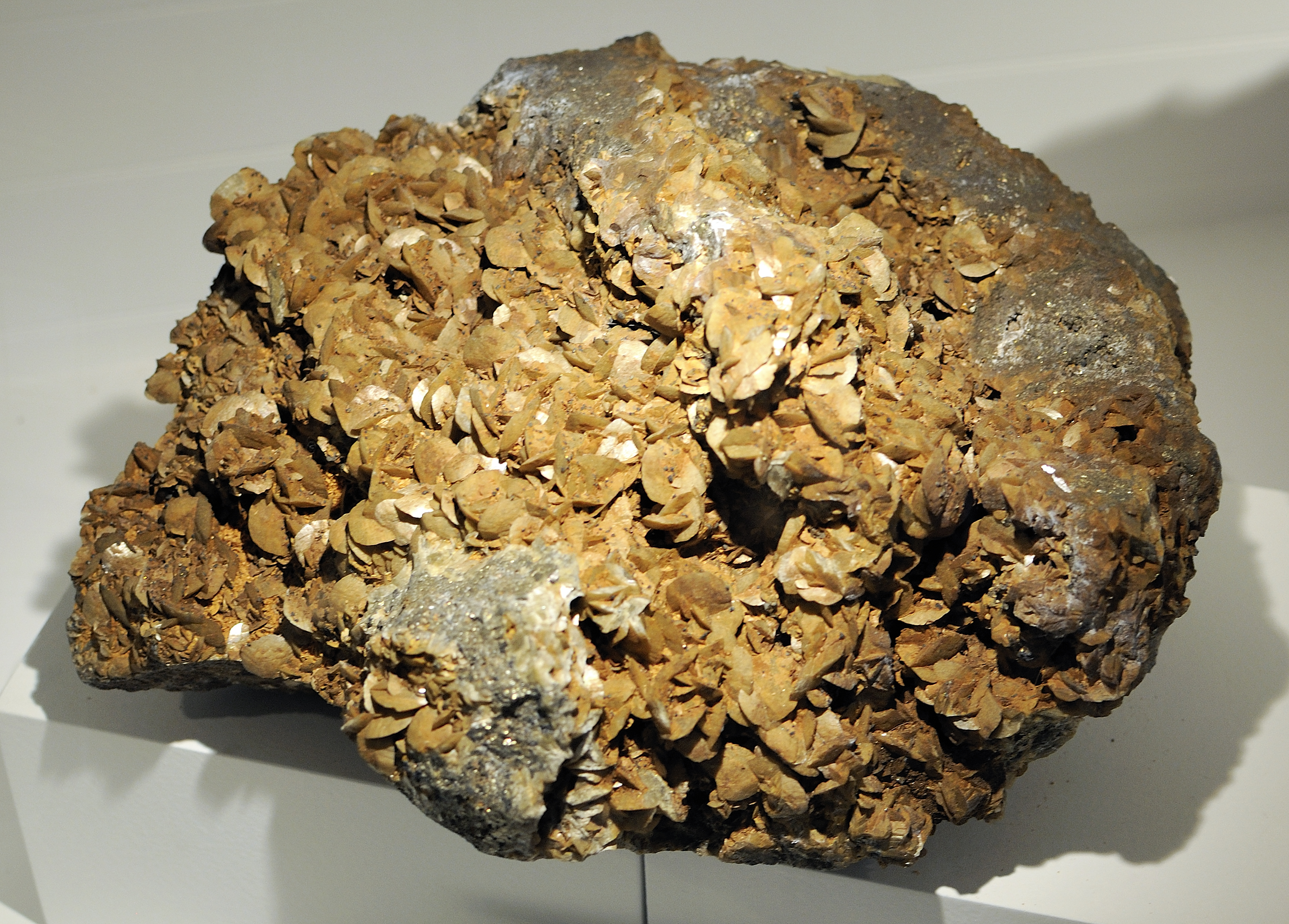

General
- Category: Carbonate mineral
- Formula: FeCO_{3}
- IMA symbol: Sd
- Strunz classification: 5.AB.05
- Dana classification: 14.01.01.03
- Crystal system: Trigonal
- Crystal class: Hexagonal scalenohedral (3̅m); H-M symbol: (3̅ 2/m)
- Space group: R3̅c
- Unit cell: a = 4.6916 c = 15.3796 [Å]; Z = 6

Identification
- Color: Pale yellow to tan, grey, brown, green, red, black and sometimes nearly colorless
- Crystal habit: Tabular crystals, often curved; botryoidal to massive
- Twinning: Lamellar uncommon on{011̅2}
- Cleavage: Perfect on {011̅1}
- Fracture: Uneven to conchoidal
- Tenacity: Brittle
- Mohs scale hardness: 3.75–4.25
- Luster: Vitreous, may be silky to pearly
- Streak: White
- Diaphaneity: Translucent to subtranslucent
- Specific gravity: 3.96
- Optical properties: Uniaxial (−)
- Refractive index: n_{ω} = 1.875 n_{ε} = 1.633
- Birefringence: δ = 0.242
- Dispersion: Strong

Siderite is a mineral composed of iron(II) carbonate (FeCO_{3}). Its name comes from the Ancient Greek word σίδηρος (sídēros), meaning "iron". A valuable iron ore, it consists of 48% iron and lacks sulfur and phosphorus. Zinc, magnesium, and manganese commonly substitute for the iron, resulting in the siderite-smithsonite, siderite-magnesite, and siderite-rhodochrosite solid solution series.

Siderite has Mohs hardness of 3.75 to 4.25, a specific gravity of 3.96, a white streak and a vitreous or pearly luster. Siderite is antiferromagnetic below its Néel temperature of 37 K (−236 °C) that can assist in its identification.

It crystallizes in the trigonal crystal system; crystals are rhombohedral in shape, typically with curved and striated faces. It also occurs in masses. Color ranges from yellow to dark brown or black, the latter being due to the presence of manganese.

Siderite is commonly found in hydrothermal veins, and is associated with barite, fluorite, galena, and others. It is also a common diagenetic mineral in shales and sandstones, where it sometimes forms concretions, which can encase three-dimensionally preserved fossils. In sedimentary rocks, siderite commonly forms at shallow burial depths and its elemental composition is often related to the depositional environment of the enclosing sediments. In addition, a number of recent studies have used the oxygen isotopic composition of sphaerosiderite (a type associated with soils) as a proxy for the isotopic composition of meteoric water shortly after deposition. Evidence of the presence of siderite on Mars is being interpreted as a possible indicator of the presence of abundant water early in the climate history of that planet.

== Carbonate iron ore ==
Although carbonate iron ores, such as siderite, have been economically important for steel production, they are far from ideal as an ore.

Their hydrothermal mineralisation tends to form them as small ore lenses, often following steeply dipping bedding planes. (Note: Some siderite, along with goethite, also forms in bog iron deposits, but these are small and economically minor.) This keeps them from being amenable to opencast working, and increases the cost of working them by mining with horizontal stopes. As the individual ore bodies are small, it may also be necessary to duplicate or relocate the pit head machinery, winding engine, and pumping engine, between these bodies as each is worked out. This makes mining the ore an expensive proposition compared to typical ironstone or haematite opencasts. (Note: Both ironstones and banded iron formations are sedimentary formations, thus the economically viable deposits may be considerable thicker and more extensive.)

The recovered ore also has drawbacks. The carbonate ore is more difficult to smelt than a haematite or other oxide ore. Driving off the carbonate as carbon dioxide requires more energy and so the ore 'kills' the blast furnace if added directly. Instead the ore must be given a preliminary roasting step. Developments of specific techniques to deal with these ores began in the early nineteenth century, largely with the work of Sir Thomas Lethbridge in Somerset. His 'Iron Mill' of 1838 used a three-chambered concentric roasting furnace, before passing the ore to a separate reducing furnace for smelting. Details of this mill were the invention of Charles Sanderson, a steel maker of Sheffield, who held the patent for it.

These differences between spathic ore and haematite have led to the failure of a number of mining concerns, notably the Brendon Hills Iron Ore Company.

Spathic iron ores are rich in manganese and have negligible phosphorus. This led to their one major benefit, connected with the Bessemer steel-making process. Although the first demonstrations by Bessemer in 1856 were successful, initial attempts by others to replicate his method failed to produce good steel. Work by the metallurgist Robert Forester Mushet showed that the reason for the discrepancy was that the Swedish ores that Bessemer had used were very low in phosphorus. Using a typical European high-phosphorus ore in Bessemer's converter gave a poor quality steel. To produce high quality steel from a high-phosphorus ore, Mushet realised that he could operate the Bessemer converter for longer, burning off all the steel's impurities including the unwanted phosphorus, but also the carbon (which is an essential ingredient in steel), and then re-adding carbon, along with manganese, in the form of a previously obscure ferromanganese ore with no phosphorus, spiegeleisen. This created a sudden demand for spiegeleisen. Although it was not available in sufficient quantity as a mineral, steelworks such as that at Ebbw Vale in South Wales soon learned to make it from the spathic siderite ores. For a few decades, spathic ores were therefore in demand and this encouraged their mining. In time though, the original 'acidic' liner of the Bessemer converter, made from siliceous sandstone or ganister, was replaced by a 'basic' liner in the newer Gilchrist Thomas process. This removed the phosphorus impurities as slag produced by chemical reaction with the liner, and no longer required spiegeleisen. From the 1880s, demand for the ores fell once again and many of their mines, including those of the Brendon Hills, closed soon after.

== Gallery ==
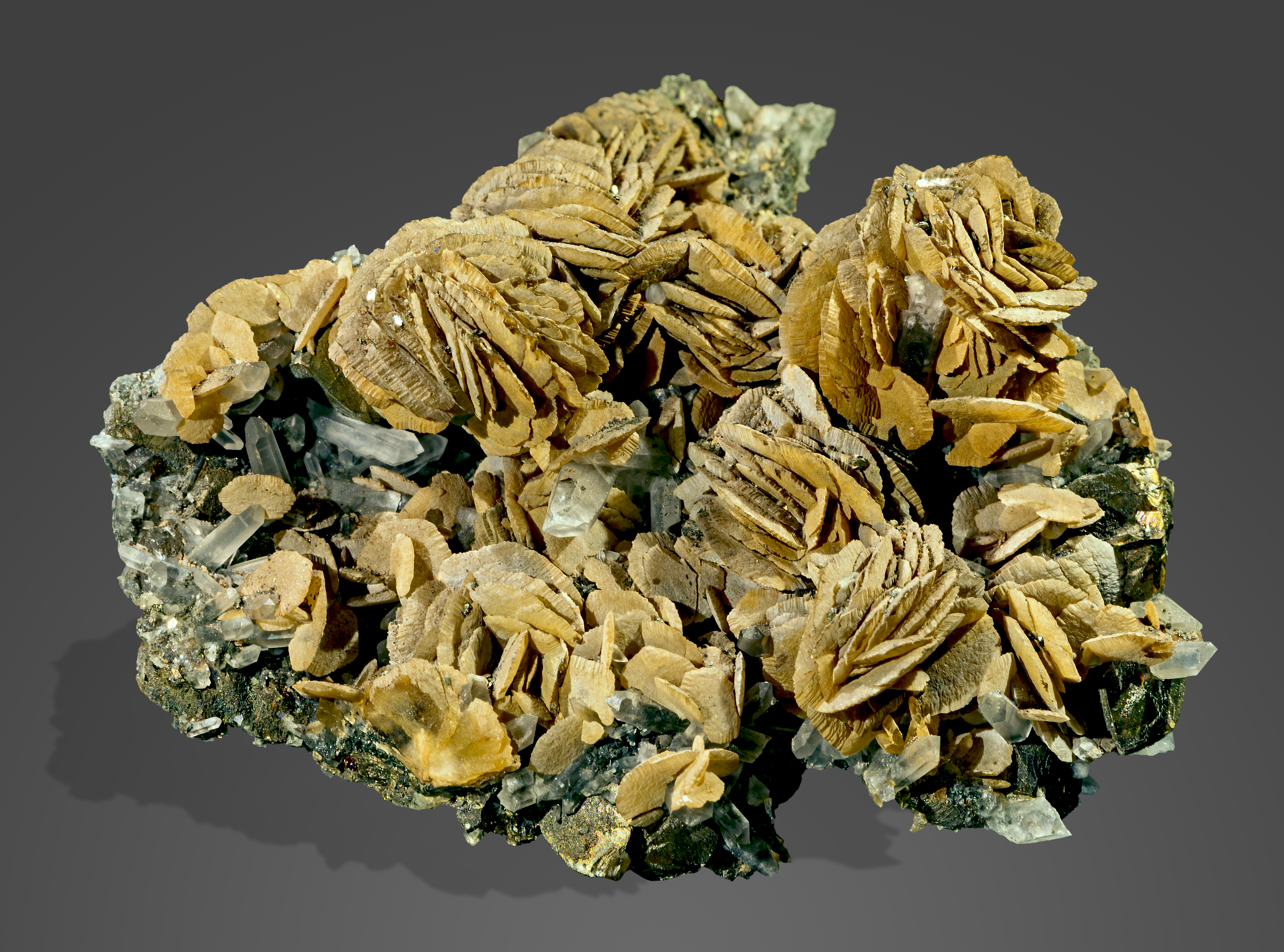
Siderite from Redruth, Cornwall, England

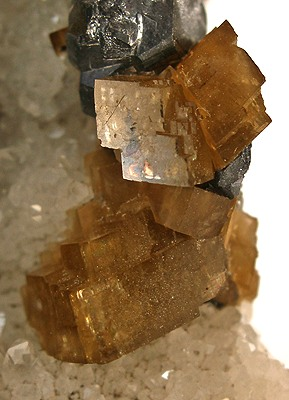
Siderite crystals with galena and quartz. Size: 6.2 cm × 4.1 cm × 3.6 cm (2.4 in × 1.6 in × 1.4 in)

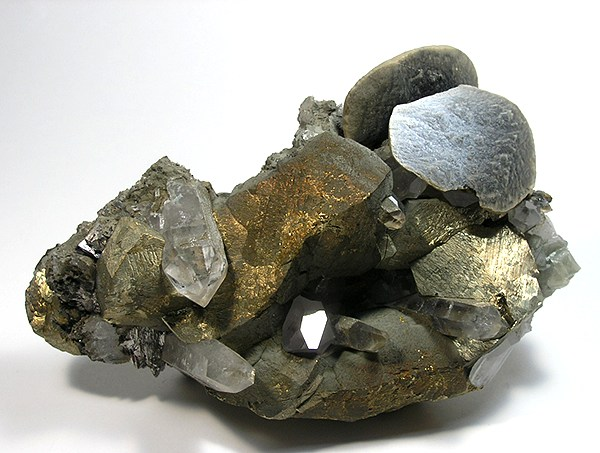
Disc-shaped, brown siderite crystals perched upon chalcopyrites

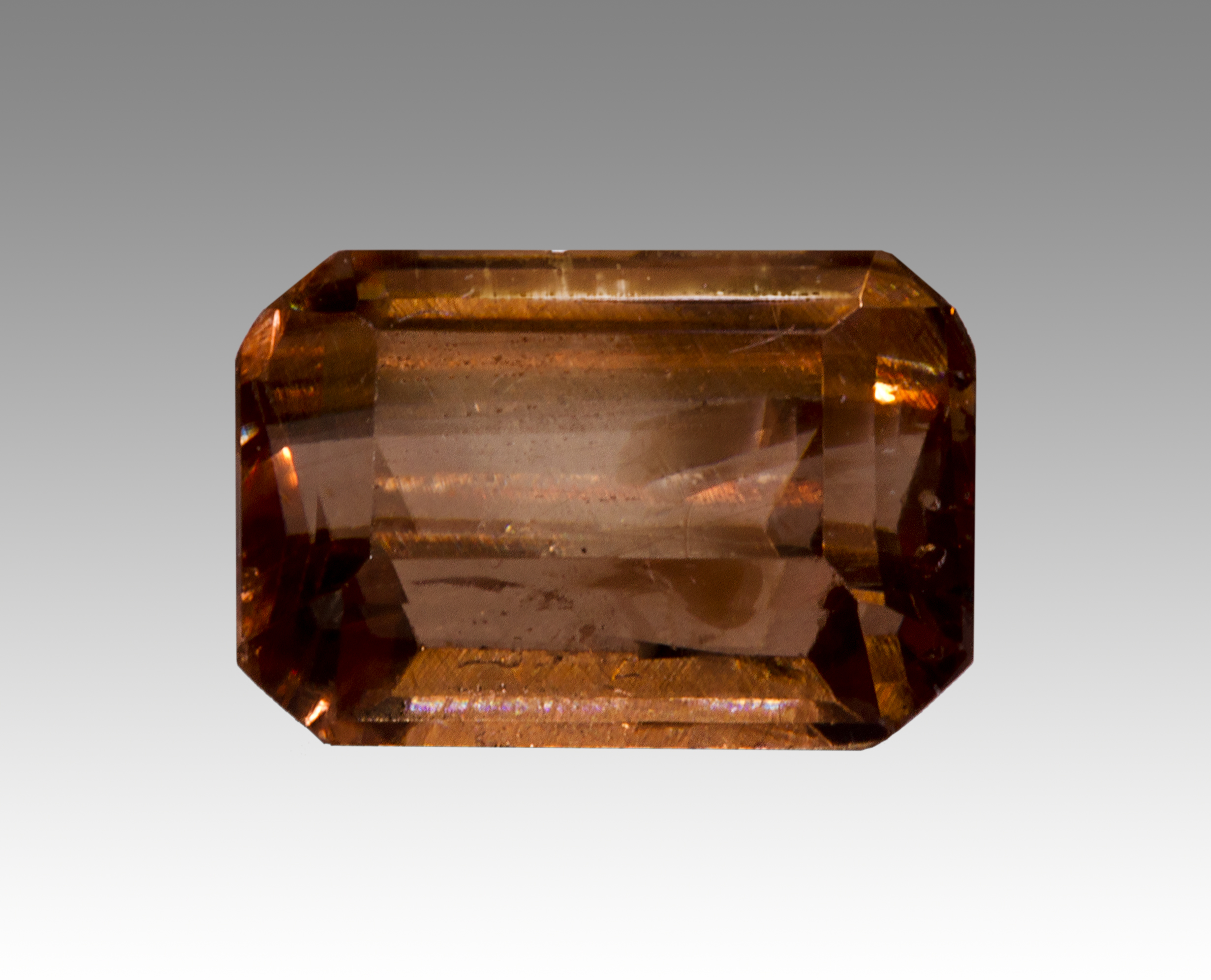
Cut siderite from Minas Gerais, Brazil. Size: 5 mm × 3.2 mm (0.20 in × 0.13 in)

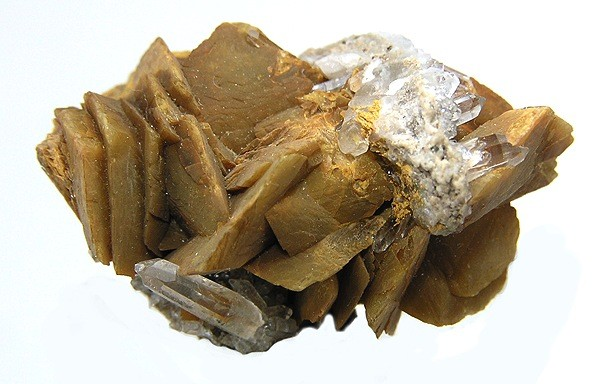
Colorado siderite, with sharp blades of olive-brown and minor accenting quartz

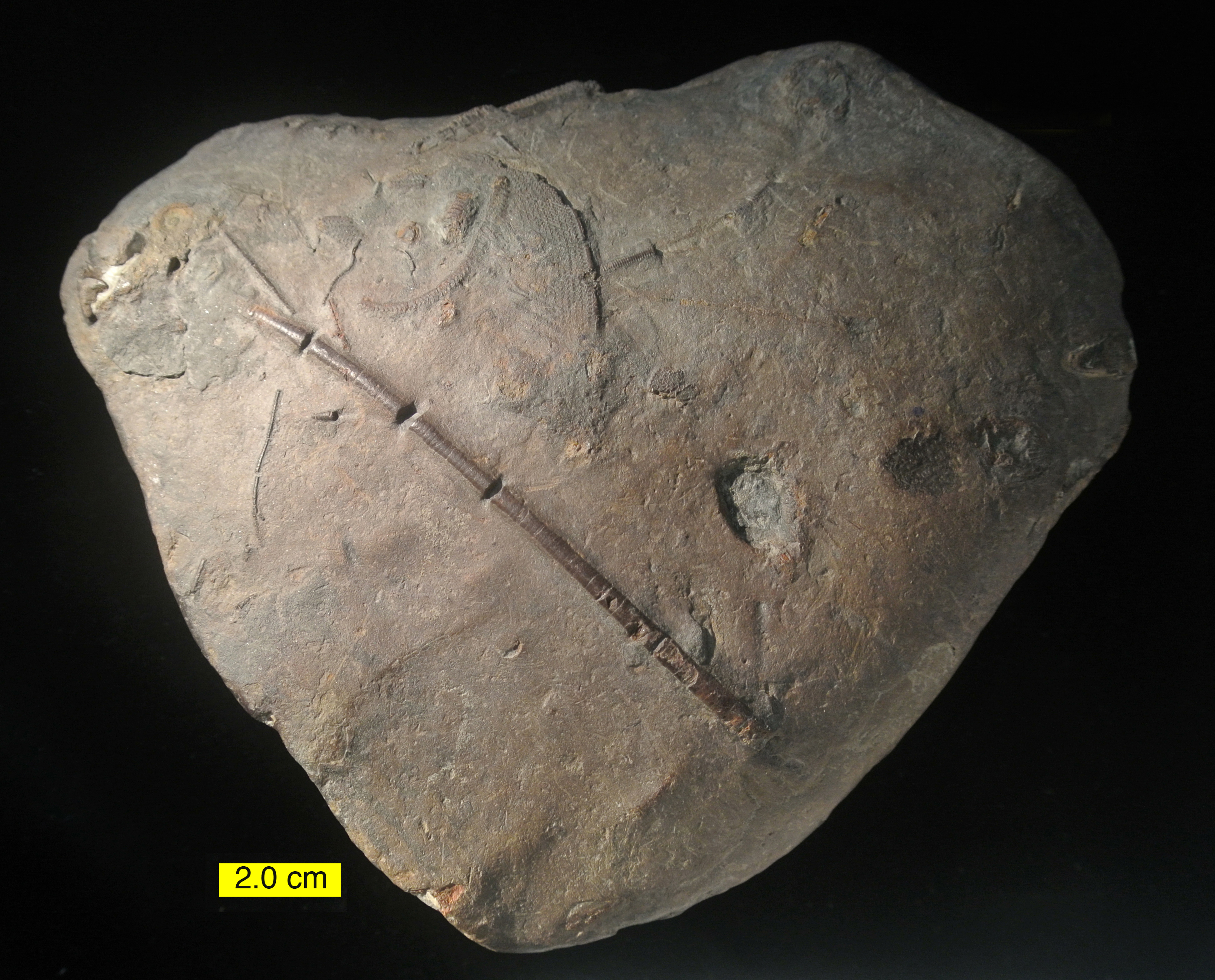
Fossiliferous siderite concretion from the Lower Carboniferous
