= Macaúbas =

Municipality of Bahia, Brazil

- Municipality
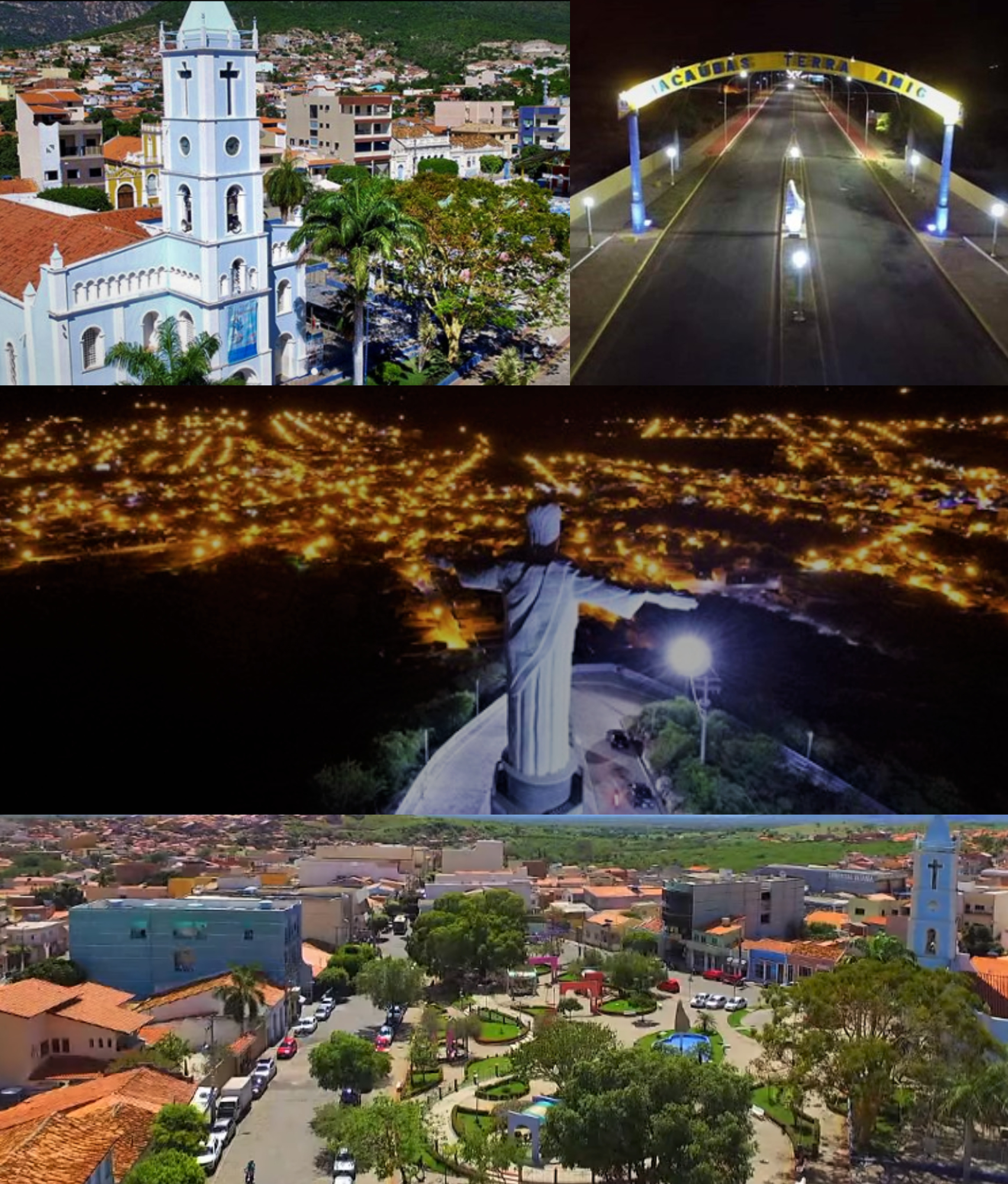
- View of Macaúbas

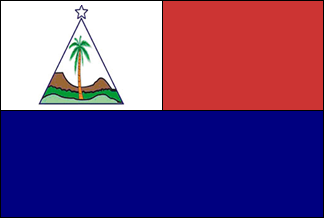
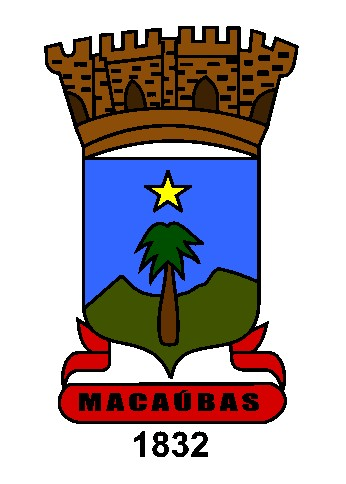
- Flag Coat of arms

- Location in Brazil
- Coordinates: 13°01′08″S 42°41′56″W
- Country: Brazil
- Region: Nordeste
- State: Bahia

Population (2020)
  - Total: 50,161
- Time zone: UTC−3 (BRT)

Macaúbas is a municipality in the state of Bahia in the North-East region of Brazil. Its population in 2020 was 50,161 inhabitants. The municipality covers an area of 3039 km^{2}. It lies in the call Physiographic Zone of the Serra Geral, the Chapada Diamantina Southern microregion.

== History ==
The Indians belonging to the Tupinaés group (Tupinambás branch) were the first inhabitants of the area). There are several archaeological sites throughout the county.

The unclassified extinct Galache language was spoken near Macaúbas.

The formation of the county began in the mid-seventeenth century, in place "Poor" when the first whites arrived there and erected a chapel in honor of Our Lady of the Immaculate Conception, patroness of the city today. Pioneers who were transiting through the Sao Francisco River in search of gold and precious stones.

The town was formed on lands belonging to the city of Vulture (Rio Branco, today Paratinga) which was partitioned in 1832 to provide independent municipality, with the toponym of Macaúbas, by state decree of July 6, 1832, which also raised its headquarters to the town category. The beginning of its operation occurred on September 23, 1833. With the growth of the village, the parsonage of the original chapel became the parish of Our Lady of the Immaculate Conception Macaúbas promoted by the provincial Law No. 124 of May 19, 1840.

This designation was due to the abundance of a species of palm, which the Indians call "macaw" or "macaw", now extinct in the county. Under State law No. 1761 of June 10, 1925, Macaúbas was elevated to city and county seat, which was incorporated into the territory of the extinct town of Bom Sucesso (current Ibitiara) already emancipated.

The city grew around the Church of Our Lady of Conception, whose parish was created by Law 124 of May 19, 1840. In training the people macaubense there is strong presence of mixed indigenous with white of Portuguese origin. The black man was not so present, because the city was poor and had many slaves. The huge city lost lands in the '60s, when emancipated themselves Boquira with the distro Bucuituba (Santa Rita) and Botuporã, the districts of New Tank and Caturama now emancipated. The territory of Macaúbas presents "general" and "plains".

== Geography ==
The main elevation is the mountain of Macaúbas very extensive and uniform, which runs the city from south to north, and rises to 1250 meters. Tributaries of San Francisco for the right margin. The Paramirim River, which rises in the Serra das Almas, forms a border with the municipalities of Caturama, Rio do Pires and Ibipitanga. The weir Macaúbas with a capacity of 20.9 million meters cubic, built by former DNOCS, remains today.

== See also ==
- List of municipalities in Bahia
