= Phosphate sulfate =

Compound with phosphate and sulfate ions

The phosphate sulfates are mixed anion compounds containing both phosphate and sulfate ions. Related compounds include the arsenate sulfates, phosphate selenates, and arsenate selenates.

Some hydrogen phosphate sulfates are superprotonic conductors.

== Natural ==
	chem	mw	crystal system	space group	unit cell	volume	density	comment	references
Sanjuanite	Al_{2}(PO_{4})(SO_{4})(OH)·9H_{2}O								
Hotsonite	Al_{11}(SO_{4})_{3}(PO_{4})_{2}(OH)_{21} · 16H_{2}O		triclinic		a=11.23, b=11.66 c=10.55 α=112° 32′, β=107° 32′ γ=64° 27′			refract: α = 1.519 γ = 1.521	
Arangasite	Al_{2}F(PO_{4})(SO_{4})·9H_{2}O		monoclinic	P2/a	a = 7.073, b = 9.634, c = 10.827, β = 100.40°, Z = 2	725.7			
peisleyite	Na_{3}Al_{16}(SO_{4})_{2}(PO_{4})_{10}(OH)_{17} · 20H_{2}O		monoclinic		a 13.31, b 12.62, c 23.15, β 110.0°, Z = 2			discredited	
peisleyite	Na2Al9[(P,S)O4]8(OH)6·28H2O		triclinic	P1̅	a = 9.28, b = 11.98, c = 13.25, α = 91.3, β = 75.6, γ = 67.67°, Z = 4	1308			
Woodhouseite	CaAl_{3}(PO_{4})(SO_{4})(OH)_{6}		trigonal	R3̅m	a = 6.993, c = 16.386	693.95	3.0	Uniaxial (+) n_{ω} = 1.636 n_{ε} = 1.647 Birefringence: δ = 0.011	
Ardéalite	Ca_{2}H(PO_{4})(SO_{4})•4H_{2}O		monoclinic		a = 5.721, b = 30.95, c = 6.265, β= 117.26° Z = 4	986.11	2.32		
Destinezite Diadochite	Fe_{2}(PO_{4})(SO_{4})(OH)•6H_{2}O		triclinic	P1̅	a = 9.570, b = 9.716, c = 7.313, α = 98.74°, β = 107.90°, γ = 63.86° Z = 2				
bohuslavite	Fe^{III}_{4}(PO_{4})_{3}(SO_{4})(OH)(H_{2}O)_{10}·nH_{2}O (5 ≤ n ≤ 14)		triclinic	P1̅	a = 13.376 b = 13.338 c = 10.863 α = 92.80, β = 91.03, γ = 119.92°, Z = 2	1675.7		pink	
Borickyite	(Ca,Mg)(Fe^{3+},Al)_{4}(PO_{4},SO_{4},CO_{3})(OH)_{8}·3–7.5H_{2}O								
Camaronesite	[Fe^{3+}(H_{2}O)_{2}(PO_{3}OH)]_{2}(SO_{4})·1–2H_{2}O		trigonal	R32	a = 9.0833, c = 42.944, Z = 9	3068.5			
	Fe^{3+}_{4}(PO_{4})_{3}(SO_{4})(OH)·18H_{2}O		triclinic	P1̅	a=13.376, b 13.338, c 10.863, α 92.80, β 91.03, γ 119.92°	1675.7			
vanderheydenite	Zn_{6}(PO_{4})_{2}(SO_{4})(OH)_{4}·7H_{2}O		monoclinic	P2_{1}/n	a = 6.204 b = 19.619, c = 7.782, β = 90.67°	947.1		biaxial (–) α = 1.565, β = 1.580 γ = 1.582. 2V = 39.8°	
Svanbergite	SrAl_{3}(PO_{4})(SO_{4})(OH)_{6}		trigonal	R3̅m	a = 6.97, c = 16.59 Z=3	697.98	3.2	Uniaxial (+) n_{ω} = 1.631 - 1.635 n_{ε} = 1.646 - 1.649 Birefringence: δ = 0.015	
Birchite	Cd_{2}Cu_{2}(PO_{4})_{2}(SO_{4}) ·5H_{2}O				a = 10.489 b = 20.901 c = 6.155 Z=4	1349.6	3.647	biaxial positive, n_{α} = 1.624, n_{β} = 1.636, n_{γ} = 1.669, 2V_{calc} = +63°.	
Corkite	PbFe_{3}(OH)_{6}SO_{4}PO_{4}		trigonal	R3̅m	a = 7.32, c = 17.02 Z=3	781.2	4.295	Uniaxial (-) n_{ω} = 1.930 n_{ε} = 1.930 n = 1.93 - 1.96 Birefringence 0.03	
	BaAl_{3}(PO_{4})(SO_{4})(OH)_{6}		trigonal	R3̅m	a = , c = Z=3				
hinsdalite	(Pb,Sr)Al_{3}(PO_{4})(SO_{4})(OH)_{6}								
Tsumebite	Pb_{2}Cu(PO_{4},SO_{4})(OH)								
Delvauxite	CaFe_{4}^{3+}(PO_{4},SO_{4})_{2}(OH)_{8}·4–6H_{2}O								
Rossiantonite	Al_{3}(PO_{4})(SO_{4})_{2}(OH)_{2}(H_{2}O)_{10}·4H_{2}O		triclinic	P1̅	a = 10.3410, b = 10.9600, c = 11.1446, α = 86.985, β = 65.727, γ = 75.064°, Z = 2	1110.5			
Schlossmacherite	(H_{3}O,Ca)Al_{3}(AsO_{4},PO_{4},SO_{4})_{2}(OH)_{6}								
Arthurite	Cu(Fe^{3+})_{2}(AsO_{4},PO_{4},SO_{4})_{2}(O,OH)_{2}·4(H_{2}O)								
cobaltarthurite									
Phosphoinnelite	Ba_{4}Na_{3}Ti_{3}Si_{4}O_{14}(PO_{4},SO_{4})_{2}(O,F)_{3}		triclinic	P1̅?	a = 5.38, b = 7.10, c = 14.76; α = 99.00°, β = 94.94°, γ = 90.14° Z = 1	555	3.82	biaxial (+), α = 1.730, β = 1.745, and γ = 1.764, 2V 90°	
Francolite	(Ca, Mg, Sr, Na)_{10}(PO_{4}, SO_{4}, CO_{3})_{6}F_{2–3}								
	Al_{4}(UO_{2})_{2}(PO_{4})_{4}(SO_{4})(OH)_{2} · 18H_{2}O								
	Al_{4}(UO_{2})_{2}(PO_{4})_{4}(SO_{4})(OH)_{2} · 20H_{2}O								
Coconinoite	Fe_{2}Al_{2}(UO_{2})_{2}(PO_{4})_{4}(SO_{4})(OH)_{2} · 20H_{2}O		monoclinic	C2/c	a =12.45, b = 12.96, c = 17.22, β = 105.7°				
xiangjiangite	Fe_{2}Al_{2}(UO_{2})_{2}(PO_{4})_{4}(SO_{4})(OH)_{2} · 22H_{2}O		tetragonal		a = 7.17 Å, b = 7.17 Å, c = 22.22 Å Z=1	1,142		Biaxial (-) n_{α} = 1.558 n_{β} = 1.576 n_{γ} = 1.593 2V: 87°	

== Artificial ==
chem	mw	crystal system	space group	unit cell Å	volume	density	comment	references
[H_{4}N^{+}]_{2}·HSO_{4}^{−}·H_{2}PO_{4}^{−}								
NH_{4}(HSO_{4})_{0.45}(H_{2}PO_{4})_{0.55}		orthorhombic						
18-crown[6]·[NH_{4}][H_{2}PO_{4}]_{0.5}[HSO_{4}]_{0.5}·H_{2}O		orthrhombic	F2dd	a=8.710 b= 28.868 c=31.206 Z=16	7846	1.346	dehydrate at 70°	
[(C_{2}H_{5})_{4}N^{+}]_{2}·HSO_{4}^{−}·H_{2}PO_{4}^{−}		Monoclinic	C2/c	a = 28.0787 b = 11.8671 c = 14.1533 β = 100.739° Z=8	4633.46	1.303	colourless; decompose at 353K	
(NH_{2}CH_{2}COOH)_{3}(H_{2}SO_{4})_{0.7}(H_{3}PO_{4})_{0.3}		monoclinic					called TGSP; colourless; ferroelectric, curie point 51 °C; pyroelectric	
Na(HSO_{4})(H_{3}PO_{4})		monoclinic	P 2_{1}	a = 5.449, b = 6.832, c = 8.718, β = 95.88°, Z = 2	322.8			
K_{2}(HSO_{4})(H_{2}PO_{4})		monoclinic	P 2_{1}/c	a = 11.150, b = 7.371, c = 9.436, β = 92.29°, Z = 4	774.9			
K_{4}(HSO_{4})_{3}(H_{2}PO_{4})		triclinic	P 1	a = 7.217, b = 7.521, c = 7.574, α = 71.52°, β = 88.28°, γ = 86.20°, Z = 1	389.1			
K_{4}(PO_{2}F_{2})_{2}(S_{2}O_{7})	534.46	monoclinic	C2/c	a = 13.00, b = 7.543, c = 19.01, β = 130.07°, Z = 4	1426.5	2.489	colourless; pyrosulfate + difluorophosphate	
K_{3}[O_{3}SOPO_{2}OSO_{3}]								
H_{1−x}Ti_{2}(PO_{4})_{3−x}(SO_{4})_{x} (x=0.5–1)								
Na_{2}MgTi(SO_{4})(PO_{4})_{2}		trigonal	R3̅c	a=8.4796 c=21.8091 Z=6	1358.1	2.818		
K_{2}MgTi(SO_{4})(PO_{4})_{2}		cubic	P2_{1}3	a=9.8743 Z=4	962.84	2.872		
Ca_{10-x}Na_{x}(PO_{4})_{6-x}(SO_{4})_{x}F_{2}		monoclinic						
NaFe_{2}(PO_{4})(SO_{4})_{2}		hexagonal	R3̅c	a=8.4243 c=21.973				
NaFe_{1.4}V_{0.6}(PO_{4})(SO_{4})_{2}								
[Ni(C_{14}H_{10}N_{4})_{3}]_{4}(PO_{4})_{2}(SO_{4}) (C_{14}H_{10}N_{4}=2,2'-bi-1H-benzimidazole)	3331.96	cubic	I4̅3d	a = 24.964 Z=4	15558	1.423	green	
Rb_{2}(HSO_{4})(H_{2}PO_{4})		monoclinic	P2_{1}/n	a=7.448, b=7.552, c=7.632, β=100.47°, Z=2	422.1			
Rb_{2}(HSO_{4})(H_{2}PO_{4})		monoclinic	P2_{1}/c	a=11.555, b=7.536, c=9.593, β=91.56, Z=4	853.0		at 160K	
Rb_{4}(HSO_{4})_{3}(H_{2}PO_{4})		orthorhombic	P2_{1}2_{1}2	a=7.612, b=14.795, c=7.446, Z=2	838.6			
18-crown[6]·Rb[H_{2}PO_{4}]_{0.5}[HSO_{4}]_{0.5}·3H_{2}O		monoclinic	C2/c	a=19.802 b=8.447 c=25.777 β=101.00° Z=8	4232	1.572	dehydrate at 70°	
Rb_{2}MgTi(SO_{4})(PO_{4})_{2}								
Sr_{4}(PO_{4})_{2}SO_{4}								
NaZrMg(PO_{4})(SO_{4})_{2}		hexagonal	R3̅c					
NaZrCo(PO_{4})(SO_{4})_{2}		hexagonal	R3̅c					
NaZrNi(PO_{4})(SO_{4})_{2}		hexagonal	R3̅c					
NaZrCu(PO_{4})(SO_{4})_{2}		hexagonal	R3̅c					
NaZrZn(PO_{4})(SO_{4})_{2}		hexagonal	R3̅c					
NaZrAl(PO_{4})_{2}(SO_{4})		hexagonal	R3̅c					
NaZrFe(PO_{4})2(SO_{4})		hexagonal	R3̅c					
H_{3}OSb_{2}(SO_{4})_{2}(PO_{4})		triclinic	P1̅	a=5.134 b=7.908 c=12.855, α=81.401° β=87.253° γ=86.49°				
KSb_{2}(SO_{4})_{2}(PO_{4})		triclinic	P1̅	a=5.1453 =7.9149 c=12.6146, α=82.054° β=87.715° γ=86.655°				
RbSb_{2}(SO_{4})_{2}(PO_{4})		triclinic	P1̅	a=5.1531 b=7.957 c=12.845, α=81.801° β=87.676° γ=86.703°				
Cs_{2}(HSO_{4})(H_{2}PO_{4})		cubic		a_{o}=4.926			>105 °C but can be supercooled	
Cs_{2}(HSO_{4})(H_{2}PO_{4})		monoclinic	P2_{1}/n	a = 7.856 b = 7.732 c = 7.827, β= 99.92° Z=2	468.3	3.261	can substitute 2.3% ammonium; proton conductivity at 110 °C is 3×10^{−3} Ω^{−1}cm^{−1}	
Cs_{3}(HSO_{4})_{2}(H_{2}PO_{4})		monoclinic	C2/c	a=19.824 b=7.859 c=19.047 β=100.20° Z=4	1387.2	3.302	stable against water solution 298-313K; phase transition at 411K	
Cs_{4}(HSO_{4})_{3}(H_{2}PO_{4})		monoclinic	C2/c	a=19.945 b=7.8565 c=8.9949 β=100.119° Z=3	1387.5	3.301	colourless	
Cs_{5}(HSO_{4})_{2}(H_{2}PO_{4})_{3}		cubic	I4̅3d	a=14.5668			over 381K goes to tetragonal a=4.965 c=5.016	
Cs_{6}H(HSO_{4})_{3}(H_{2}PO_{4})_{4}		cubic	I4̅3d	a=14.4758	3033.38	3.236	colourless	
Cs_{5}(HSO_{4})_{3}(H_{2}PO_{4})_{2}		monoclinic	C2/c	a=34.07 Å,b=7.661,c=9.158,β=90.44°	2390	3.198		
18-crown[6]·Cs[H_{2}PO_{4}]_{0.5}[HSO_{4}]_{0.5}·3H_{2}O		monoclinic	C2/c	a=19.840 b=8.460 c=26.19 β=101.14 Z=8	4313	1.689	dehydrate at 70°	
CsNH_{4}(HSO_{4})(H_{2}PO_{4})								
Cs_{3}NH_{4}(HSO_{4})_{3}(H_{2}PO_{4})								
Cs_{2}MgTi(SO_{4})(PO_{4})_{2}								
Ba_{4}(PO_{4})_{2}SO_{4}								
NaBa_{6}Zr(PO_{4})_{5}SO_{4}		cubic	I4̅3d	a = 10.5449 Z=4	1172.54		eulytite mineral structure	
Ba_{2}Sr2(PO_{4})_{2}SO_{4}								
Ba_{3}Sr(PO_{4})_{2}SO_{4}								
Ce_{2}O(HPO_{4})_{2}(SO_{4}). 4H_{2}O							Ce^{IV}	
Ce_{2}O(HPO_{4})_{2.4}(SO_{4})_{0.6}. 2H_{2}O							Ce^{III}	
[enH_{2}]_{0.5}[Ce^{III}(PO_{4})(HSO_{4})(OH_{2})]		monoclinic	P2_{1}/a	a=12.999 b=7.150 c=9.212 β=95.33			cream colour	
KSr_{2}Eu(PO_{4})_{2}SO_{4}								
RbSr_{2}Eu(PO_{4})_{2}SO_{4}								
CsSr_{2}Eu(PO_{4})_{2}SO_{4}								
[enH_{2}]_{0.5}[Ho(HPO_{4})(SO_{4})(H_{2}O)]		monoclinic	P2_{1}/a	a = 12.938 b = 6.834 c = 9.100 β = 88.12°				
Pb_{2}Mg_{2}(PO_{4})_{2}SO_{4}								
MgPb_{3}(PO_{4})_{2}(SO_{4})		cubic	I4̅3d	a = 10.299 Z=4	1092.4	5.67		
CaPb_{3}(PO_{4})_{2}(SO_{4})		cubic	I4̅3d	a = 10.296 Z=4	1091.5	5.77		
MnPb_{3}(PO_{4})_{2}(SO_{4})		cubic	I4̅3d	a = 10.258 Z=4	1079.4	5.92		
CoPb_{3}(PO_{4})_{2}(SO_{4})		cubic	I4̅3d	a = 10.356 Z=4	1110.6	5.78		
NiPb_{3}(PO_{4})_{2}(SO_{4})		cubic	I4̅3d	a = 10.434 Z=4	1135.9	5.65		
CuPb_{3}(PO_{4})_{2}(SO_{4})		cubic	I4̅3d	a = 10.422 Z=4	1132.0	5.70		
ZnPb_{3}(PO_{4})_{2}(SO_{4})		cubic	I4̅3d	a = 10.449 Z=4	1140.8	5.67		
CdPb_{3}(PO_{4})_{2}(SO_{4})		cubic	I4̅3d	a = 10.315 Z=4	1097.5	6.17		
SrPb_{3}(PO_{4})_{2}(SO_{4})		cubic	I4̅3d	a = 10.369 Z=4	1114.8	5.93		
Th_{2}(PO_{4})_{2}SO_{4}·2 H_{2}O							decompose 450 °C	

== Organic derivatives ==
A catenated sulfophosphate has the sulfur and phosphorus joined by an oxygen atom. In biochemistry, metabolism of sulfate may use such a group, for example with adenosine-5'-phosphosulfate.
