= Woodhouseite =

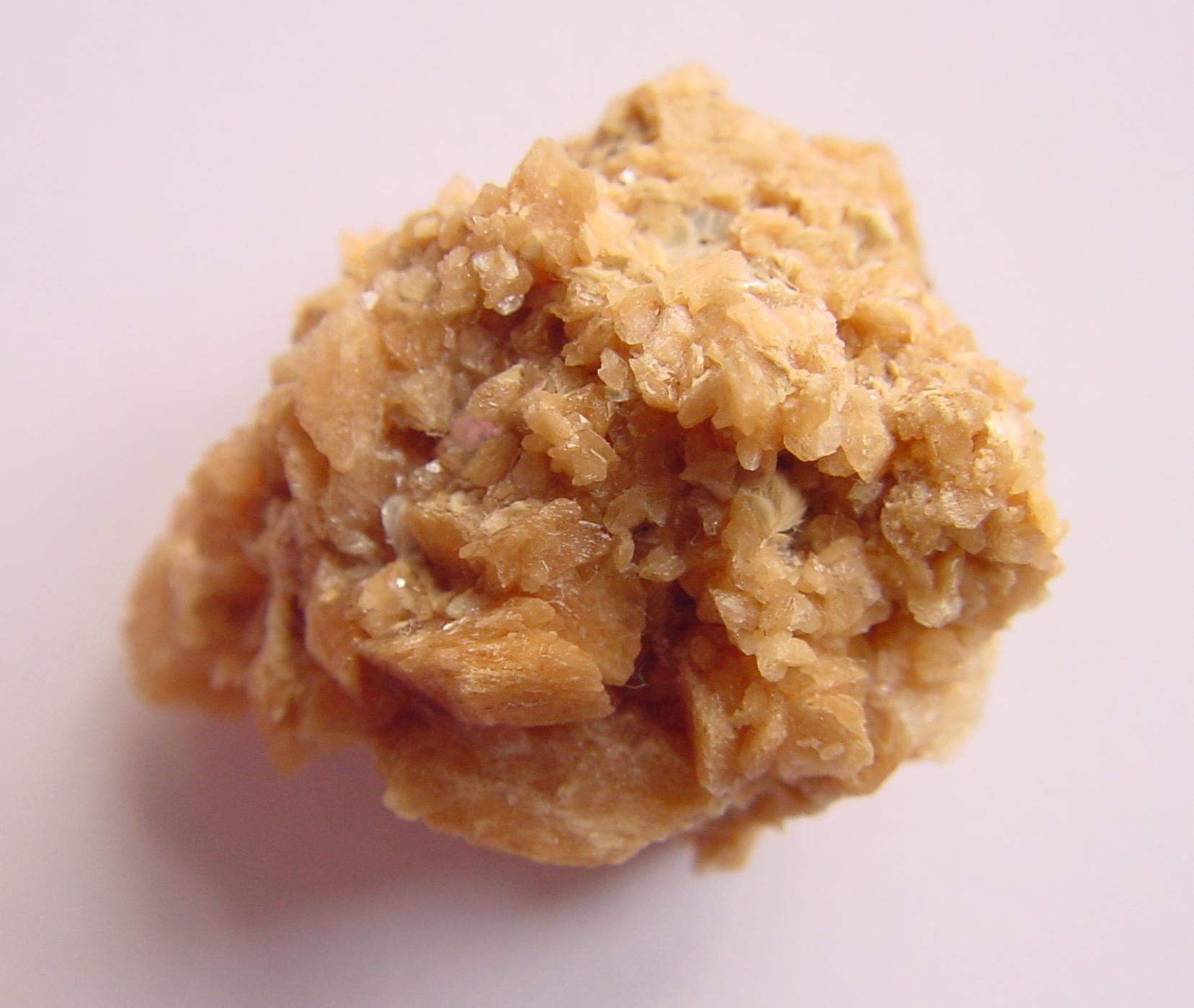
- Woodhouseite from the type locality, the Champion Mine, Mono County, California, US. Specimen width is 2.8 cm

General
- Category: Phosphate minerals
- Formula: CaAl_{3}(SO_{4})(PO_{4})(OH)_{6}
- IMA symbol: Wdh
- Strunz classification: 8.BL.05
- Dana classification: 43.04.01.08
- Crystal system: Trigonal
- Crystal class: Hexagonal scalenohedral (3̅ 2/m)
- Space group: R3̅m (no. 166)

Identification
- Formula mass: 414.10 g/mol
- Color: White, flesh-pink or colorless
- Crystal habit: Crystals small, pseudocubic rhombohedral {1012}; tabular at times {0001}, with curved and striated faces.
- Cleavage: Excellent on {0001}
- Mohs scale hardness: 4.5
- Luster: Vitreous, pearly on {0001}
- Streak: White
- Diaphaneity: Transparent to translucent
- Specific gravity: (measured): 3.012 (calculated): 3.00
- Optical properties: Uniaxial (+), 2V = 0° to 20°
- Refractive index: (AM22) nω = 1.636 nε = 1.647
- Birefringence: δ = 0.011
- Solubility: Soluble in acids only after driving off the water in a closed tube.
- Other characteristics: Not radioactive.

Woodhouseite belongs to the beudantite group AB_{3}(XO_{4})(SO_{4})(OH)_{6} where A = Ba, Ca, Pb or Sr, B = Al or Fe and X = S, As or P. Minerals in this group are isostructural with each other and also with minerals in the crandallite and alunite groups. They crystallise in the rhombohedral system with space group R3̅m and crystals are usually either tabular {0001} or pseudo-cubic to pseudo-cuboctahedral. Woodhouseite was named after Professor Charles Douglas Woodhouse (1888–1975), an American mineralogist and mineral collector from the University of California, Santa Barbara, US, and one-time General Manager of Champion Sillimanite, Inc.

== Environment ==
Woodhouseite is a secondary mineral found where wall rock alteration occurred in hydrothermal and disseminated ore deposits; rare in cave deposits, formed from guano. At the type locality it occurs in vugs in quartz veins in an andalusite, Al_{2}OSiO_{4}, deposit. This is in pre-Cambrian meta-quartzite that has been intruded by late Jurassic granitic rocks. Woodhouseite is found only near masses of lazulite, MgAl_{2}(PO_{4})_{2}(OH)_{2}. Associated Minerals at the type locality include topaz, Al_{2}SiO_{4}F_{2}, quartz, SiO_{2}, augelite, Al_{2}PO_{4}(OH)_{3}, lazulite, MgAl_{2}(PO_{4})_{2}(OH)_{2}, tourmaline, baryte, BaSO_{4}, muscovite, KAl_{2}(Si_{3}Al)O_{10}(OH)_{2}, and pyrophyllite, Al_{2}Si_{4}O_{10}(OH)_{2}, all of which formed before the woodhouseite, which is a late-forming mineral.

== Localities ==
The type locality is the Champion Mine (White Mountain Mine), White Mountain, Laws, White Mountains, Mono County, California, US. This is a former sillimanite mine located near Laws; mineralisation is a metamorphic sillimanite deposit hosted in quartzite.

== Structure ==
Space Group: R3̅ 2/m
Unit Cell Parameters: a = 6.993 Å, c = 16.386 Å, Z: 3
