= Augelite =

Aluminium phosphate mineral

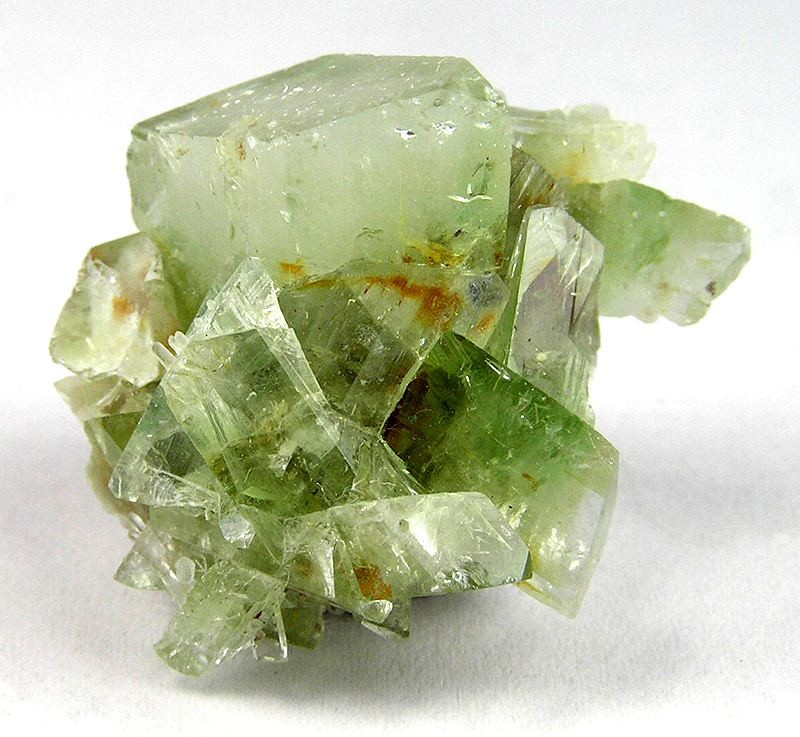

General
- Category: Phosphate mineral
- Formula: Al_{2}(PO_{4})(OH)_{3}
- IMA symbol: Aul
- Strunz classification: 8.BE.05
- Crystal system: Monoclinic
- Crystal class: Prismatic (2/m) (same H-M symbol)
- Space group: C2/m
- Unit cell: a = 13.124(6), b = 7.988(5) c = 5.0633(3) [Å] β = 112.25(2)°; Z = 4

Identification
- Color: Colorless to white, may be yellowish to pale rose, greenish
- Crystal habit: Tabular to prismatic or acicular crystals; massive
- Cleavage: Perfect on {110}, good on {201}, imperfect on {001} and {101}
- Fracture: Uneven
- Tenacity: Brittle
- Mohs scale hardness: 4 – 4.5
- Luster: Vitreous, pearly on {110} cleavage
- Streak: White
- Diaphaneity: Transparent
- Specific gravity: 2.696
- Optical properties: Biaxial (+)
- Refractive index: n_{α} = 1.574 n_{β} = 1.576 n_{γ} = 1.588
- Birefringence: δ = 0.014
- 2V angle: Measured: 50°

Augelite is an aluminium phosphate mineral with formula: Al_{2}(PO_{4})(OH)_{3}. The shade varies from colorless to white, yellow or rose. Its crystal system is monoclinic.

It was first described by Christian Wilhelm Blomstrand for an occurrence in Västanå iron mine at Scania, Sweden in 1868 and derives its name from the Greek αύγή in reference to its pearly lustre.

It occurs as a product of metamorphism of phosphate bearing peraluminous sediments and in high-temperature hydrothermal ore deposits. It occurs in association with attakolite, svanbergite, lazulite, hematite, trolleite, berlinite, rutile, pyrophyllite, baryte, arsenopyrite, stannite, pyrite, andorite, cassiterite and zinkenite.
