= Turquoise (color) =

Greenish-blue color

Color coordinates
- Hex triplet: #40E0D0
- sRGB^{B} (r, g, b): (64, 224, 208)
- HSV (h, s, v): (174°, 71%, 88%)
- CIELCh_{uv} (L, C, h): (81, 59, 179°)
- Source: Secondary color
- ISCC–NBS descriptor: Brilliant bluish green
- B: Normalized to [0–255] (byte)

Turquoise (Note: /ˈtɜːrk(w)ɔɪz/ TUR-k(w)oyz) is a cyan color, based on the mineral of the same name.

The X11 color named turquoise is displayed on the right.

== Names ==
The word turquoise dates to the 16th century and is derived from the Old French turquois meaning "Turkish" because the mineral was first brought to Europe through the Ottoman Empire from the mines in the historical Khorasan province of Iran (Persia). The name is considered a misnomer, as the mineral came from Persia and is not found in Turkey. The first recorded use of turquoise as a color name in English was in 1573.

Pliny the Elder referred to the mineral as callais (from Ancient Greek κάλαϊς) and the Aztecs knew it as chalchihuitl.

In professional mineralogy, until the mid-19th century, the scientific names kalaite or azure spar were also used, which simultaneously provided a version of the mineral origin of turquoise. However, these terms did not become widespread and gradually fell out of use.

== Turquoise gemstones ==
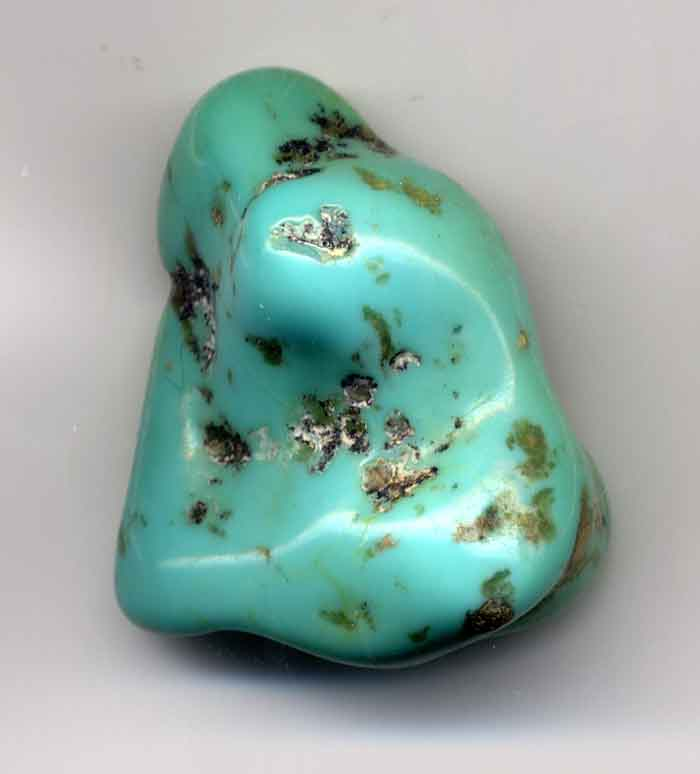
The turquoise gemstone is the namesake for the color.

Turquoise is an opaque, blue-to-green mineral that is a hydrous phosphate of copper and aluminium, with the chemical formula Cu Al_{6}(P O_{4})_{4}(OH)_{8}·4H_{2}O. It is rare and valuable in finer grades and has been prized as a gem and ornamental stone for thousands of years owing to its unique hue.

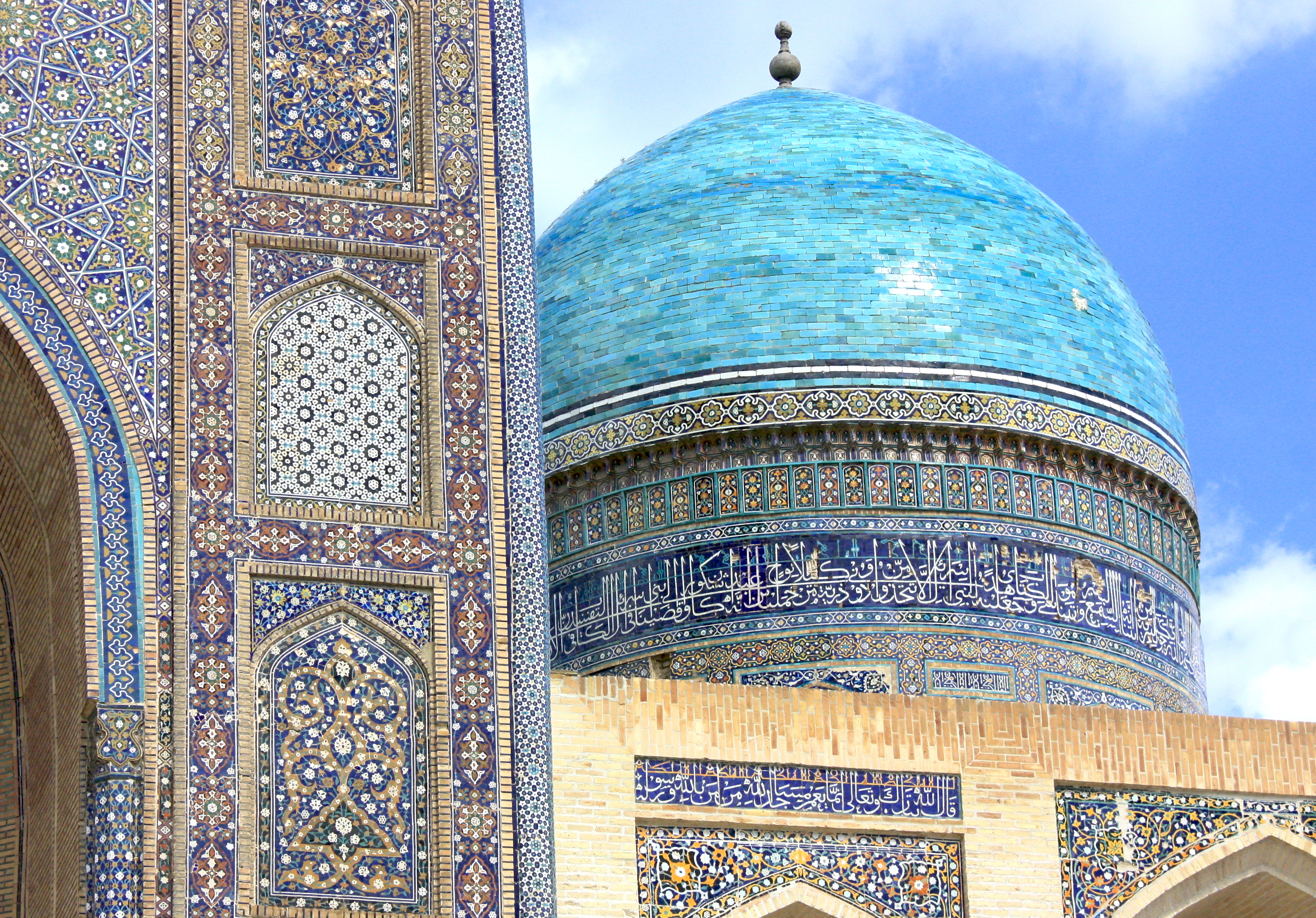
A turquoise dome of the Po-i-Kalyan Mosque in Bukhara, Uzbekistan

Turquoise was mined by pre-Columbian Native Americans in deposits in New Mexico (Los Cerrillos) and likely in California as well. Additionally, it was used by the Ancient Egyptians, although not very commonly. Several turquoise artefacts, such as beads and reclining calves, have also been found in Greece, dating to the Mycenaean era (1500BC).

Turquoise mining later attracted brief European interest in the late 1800s. Prices peaked in 1890, then collapsed by 1912, ending large-scale operations. During Mohammad Khodabanda's reign (1578–1587), accumulated turquoise dust from fifty years of mining in Safavid Iran was squandered lavishly, reflecting royal excess amid economic hardship, political discord, and rising factionalism among the qezelbash elite.

Turquoise is a stone and color that is strongly associated with the domes and interiors of large mosques in Iran, Central Asia, and Russia.

== Variations ==
=== Celeste ===
Celeste

Color coordinates
- Hex triplet: #B2FFFF
- sRGB^{B} (r, g, b): (178, 255, 255)
- HSV (h, s, v): (180°, 30%, 100%)
- CIELCh_{uv} (L, C, h): (95, 38, 192°)
- Source: S.Fantetti e C.Petracchi (2001). Il dizionario dei colori: nomi e valori in quadricromia. Zanichelli. ISBN 8808079953.
- ISCC–NBS descriptor: Very light bluish green
- B: Normalized to [0–255] (byte)

Celeste is a sky blue turquoise.

=== Light turquoise ===
Light turquoise

Color coordinates
- Hex triplet: #AFEEEE
- sRGB^{B} (r, g, b): (175, 238, 238)
- HSV (h, s, v): (180°, 26%, 93%)
- CIELCh_{uv} (L, C, h): (90, 32, 192°)
- Source: X11
- ISCC–NBS descriptor: Very light bluish green
- B: Normalized to [0–255] (byte)

Light turquoise is a lighter tone of turquoise.

=== Turquoise blue ===
Turquoise blue

Color coordinates
- Hex triplet: #00FFEF
- sRGB^{B} (r, g, b): (0, 255, 239)
- HSV (h, s, v): (176°, 100%, 100%)
- CIELCh_{uv} (L, C, h): (91, 72, 182°)
- Source: Maerz and Paul
- ISCC–NBS descriptor: Brilliant bluish green
- B: Normalized to [0–255] (byte)

Turquoise blue is close to turquoise on the color wheel, but slightly more blue.

The first recorded use of turquoise blue as a color name in English was in 1900.

=== Medium turquoise ===
Medium turquoise

Color coordinates
- Hex triplet: #48D1CC
- sRGB^{B} (r, g, b): (72, 209, 204)
- HSV (h, s, v): (178°, 66%, 82%)
- CIELCh_{uv} (L, C, h): (77, 53, 188°)
- Source: X11
- ISCC–NBS descriptor: Brilliant bluish green
- B: Normalized to [0–255] (byte)

This is the web color medium turquoise.

=== Dark turquoise ===
Dark turquoise

Color coordinates
- Hex triplet: #00CED1
- sRGB^{B} (r, g, b): (0, 206, 209)
- HSV (h, s, v): (181°, 100%, 82%)
- CIELCh_{uv} (L, C, h): (75, 60, 195°)
- Source: X11
- ISCC–NBS descriptor: Brilliant bluish green
- B: Normalized to [0–255] (byte)

This is the web color dark turquoise.

=== Bright turquoise ===
Bright turquoise

Color coordinates
- Hex triplet: #08E8DE
- sRGB^{B} (r, g, b): (8, 232, 222)
- HSV (h, s, v): (177°, 97%, 91%)
- CIELCh_{uv} (L, C, h): (83, 66, 185°)
- ISCC–NBS descriptor: Brilliant bluish green
- B: Normalized to [0–255] (byte)

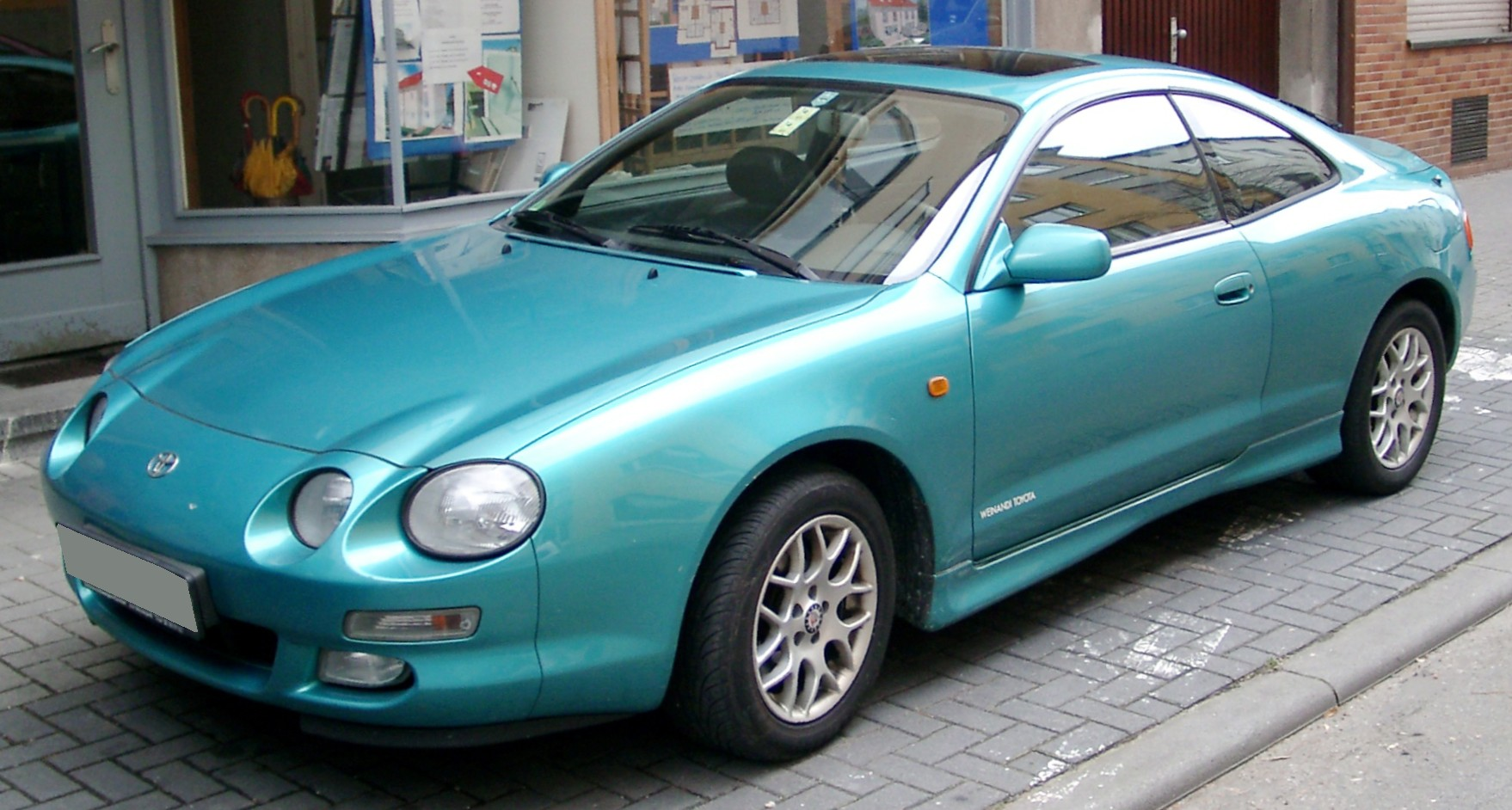
This Toyota Celica GT Liftback painted Bright Turquoise Metallic. Turquoise was a popular color for cars during the 1990s.

This is the color bright turquoise.

== See also ==
- List of colors
