= Berlinite =

Phosphate mineral

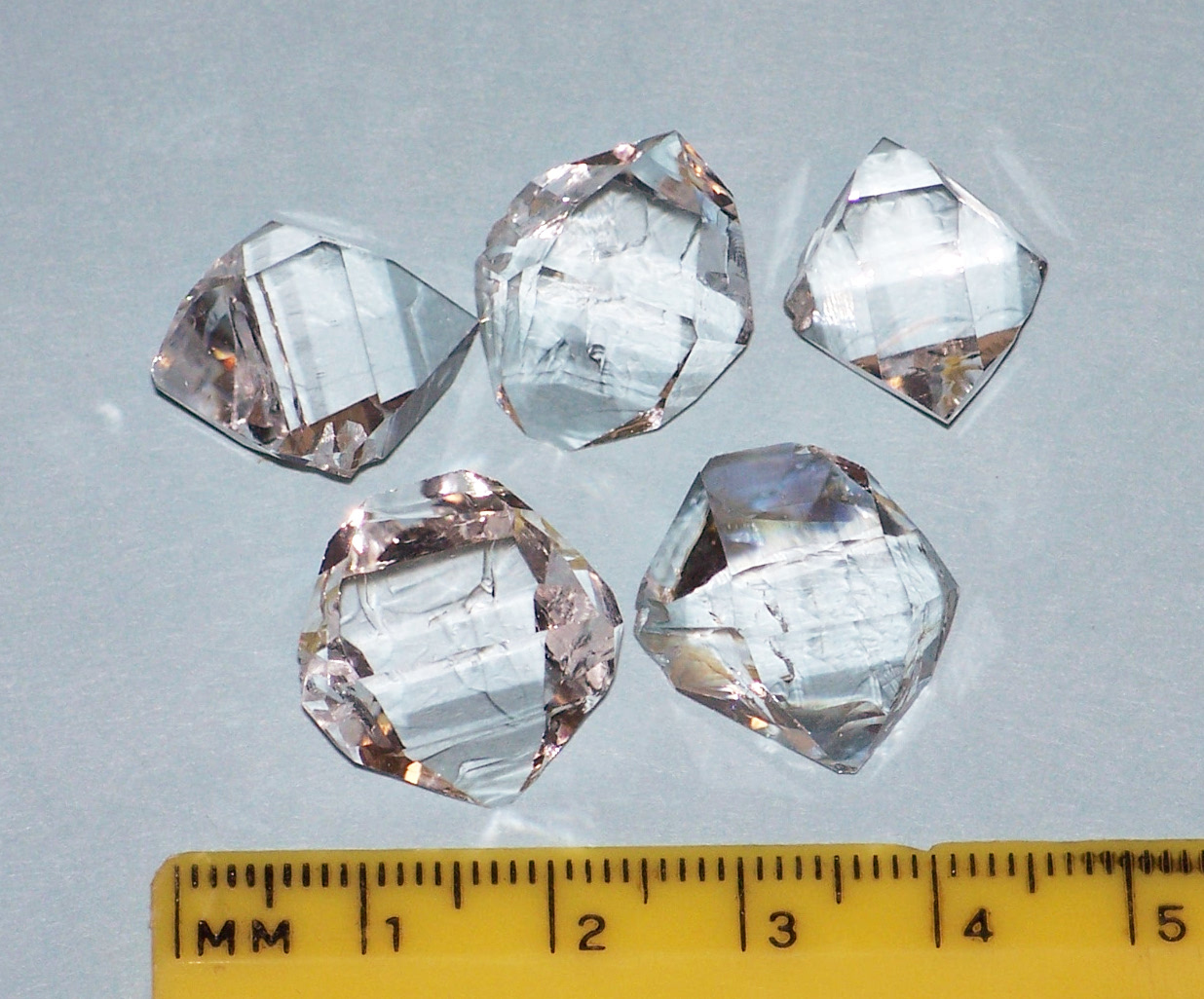
- Synthetic berlinite

General
- Category: Phosphate mineral
- Formula: AlPO_{4}
- IMA symbol: Ber
- Strunz classification: 8.AA.05
- Crystal system: Trigonal
- Crystal class: Trapezohedral (32); H-M symbol: (32)
- Space group: P3_{1}21, P3_{2}21
- Unit cell: a = 4.941 Å, c = 10.94 Å; Z = 3

Identification
- Color: Colorless, pale gray, may be pale rose
- Crystal habit: Typically granular to massive
- Twinning: Subparallel lamellae
- Fracture: Conchoidal
- Mohs scale hardness: 6.5
- Luster: Vitreous
- Diaphaneity: Transparent to translucent
- Specific gravity: 2.64–2.66
- Optical properties: Uniaxial (+)
- Refractive index: n_{ω} = 1.524 n_{ε} = 1.532
- Birefringence: δ = 0.008

Berlinite (aluminium phosphate, chemical formula AlPO_{4} or Al(PO_{4})) is a rare high-temperature hydrothermal or metasomatic phosphate mineral. It has the same crystal structure as quartz with a low temperature polytype isostructural with α–quartz and a high temperature polytype isostructural with β–quartz. Berlinite can vary from colorless to greyish or pale pink and has translucent crystals.

It was first described in 1868 for an occurrence in the Västanå iron mine, Scania, Sweden and named for Nils Johan Berlin (1812–1891) of Lund University.

It occurs as a rare mineral in high-temperature hydrothermal or metasomatic deposits. Associated minerals include augelite, attakolite, kyanite, pyrophyllite, scorzalite, lazulite, gatumbaite, burangaite, amblygonite, phosphosiderite, purpurite, apatite, muscovite, quartz, hematite in granite pegmatites. It also occurs with alunite, aragonite, collophane, crandallite, francoanellite, gypsum, huntite, hydromagnesite, leucophosphite, nesquehonite, niter, and nitrocalcite in the Paddy's River copper mine in the Brindabella Mountains of Australia.
