= Aluminium phosphate =

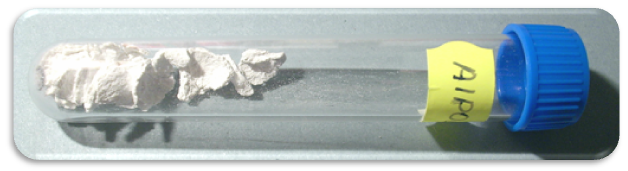
- Aluminium phosphate

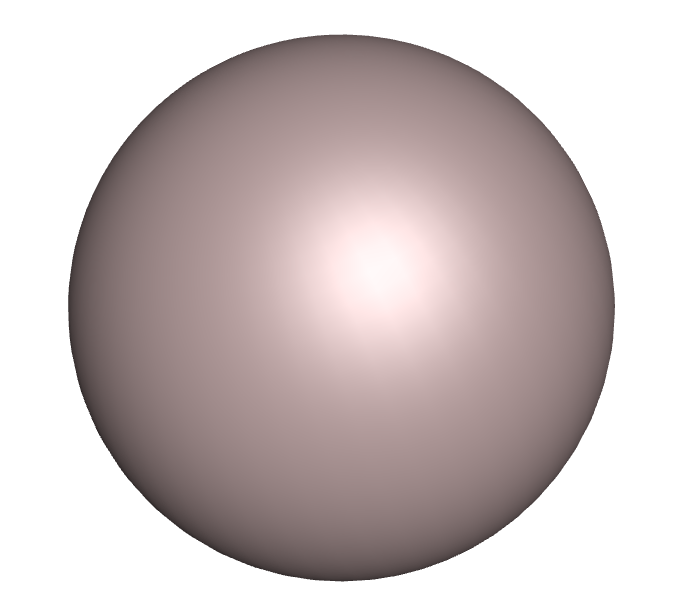

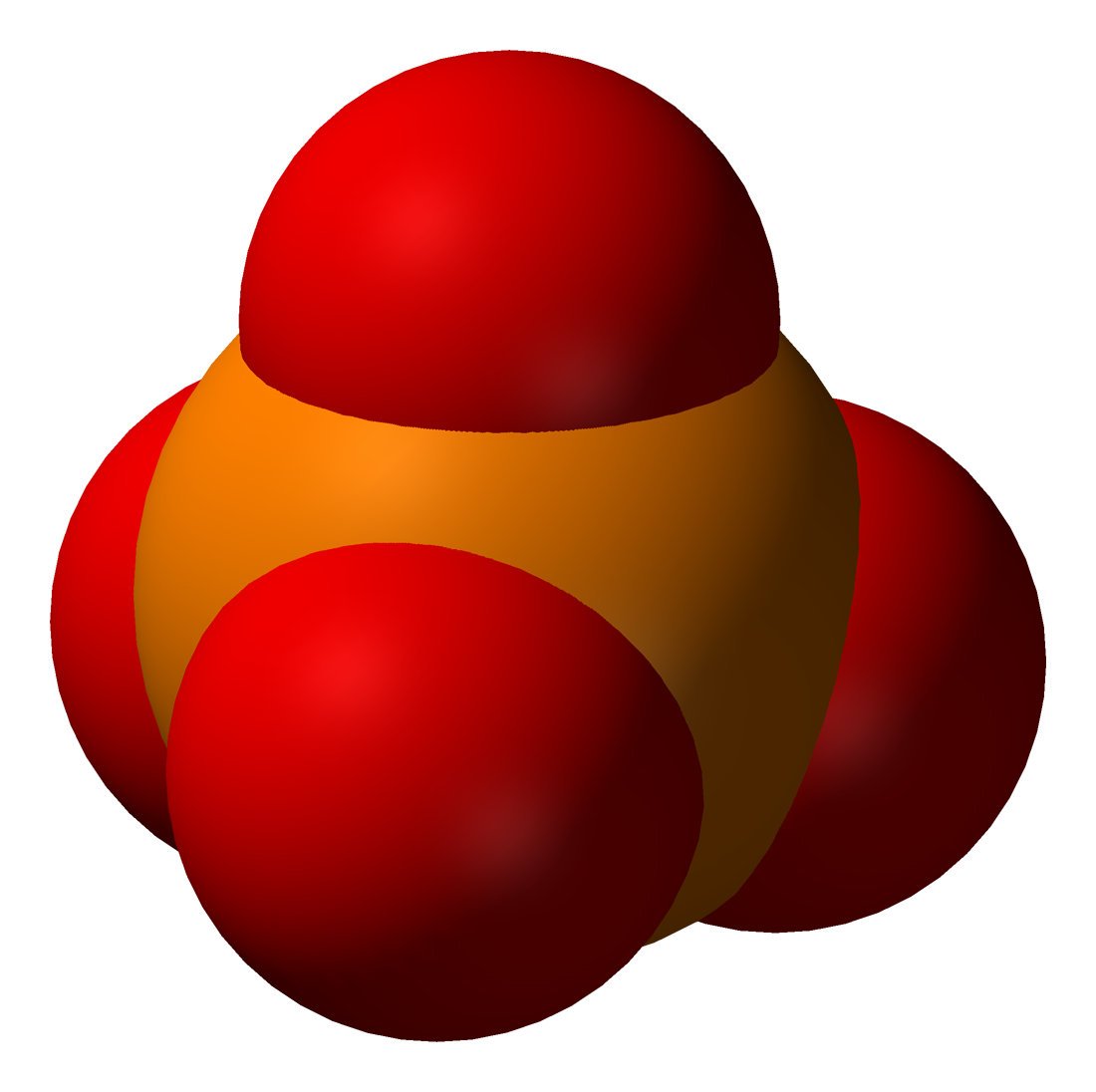

Names
- Other names Aluminum phosphate Aluminium monophosphate Phosphoric acid, aluminium salt (1:1)

Identifiers
CAS Number	7784-30-7 22784-12-9 (trihydrate)
3D model (JSmol)	Interactive image; Interactive image
ChEMBL	ChEMBL3833315
ChemSpider	58204
DrugBank	DB14517
ECHA InfoCard	100.029.142
EC Number	232-056-9
PubChem CID	64655
RTECS number	TB6450000
UNII	F92V3S521O
UN number	1760
CompTox Dashboard (EPA)	DTXSID5064839
- InChI: InChI=1S/Al.H3O4P/c;1-5(2,3)4/h;(H3,1,2,3,4)/q+3;/p-3 Key: ILRRQNADMUWWFW-UHFFFAOYSA-K; InChI=1/Al.H3O4P/c;1-5(2,3)4/h;(H3,1,2,3,4)/q+3;/p-3/rAlO4P/c2-6-3-1(4-6)5-6 Key: ILRRQNADMUWWFW-ITXURHEJAW; InChI=1/Al.H3O4P/c;1-5(2,3)4/h;(H3,1,2,3,4)/q+3;/p-3 Key: ILRRQNADMUWWFW-DFZHHIFOAZ
- SMILES: O=P12O[Al](O1)O2; [Al+3].[O-]P([O-])([O-])=O

Properties
Chemical formula	AlPO_{4}
Molar mass	121.9529 g/mol
Appearance	White, crystalline powder
Density	2.566 g/cm^{3}, solid
Melting point	1,800 °C (3,270 °F; 2,070 K)
Boiling point	Decomposes
Solubility in water	1.89×10^{−9} g/100 ml
Solubility product (K_{sp})	9.84×10^{−21}
Solubility	Very slightly soluble in HCl and HNO_{3}
Refractive index (n_{D})	1.546

Pharmacology
ATC code	A02AB03 (WHO)

Hazards
- GHS labelling
Pictograms	(GHS05: Corrosive) (GHS07: Exclamation mark)
Signal word	Warning
Hazard statements	H314, H315, H319, H332, H335
Precautionary statements	P260, P264, P271, P280, P301+P330+P331, P302+P352, P303+P361+P353, P304+P312, P304+P340, P305+P351+P338, P310, P312, P321, P332+P313, P337+P313, P362, P363, P403+P233, P405, P501
NFPA 704 (fire diamond)	2 0 0
- Lethal dose or concentration (LD, LC)
LD_{50} (median dose)	4640 mg/kg (rat, oral) > 4640 mg/kg (rabbit, dermal)
- Except where otherwise noted, data are given for materials in their standard state (at 25 °C [77 °F], 100 kPa). verify (what is ?) Infobox references

Aluminium phosphate is a chemical compound with the formula AlPO_{4}. In nature, it occurs as the mineral berlinite. Many synthetic forms of aluminium phosphate are known. They have framework structures similar to zeolites and some are used as catalysts, ion-exchangers or molecular sieves. Commercial aluminium phosphate gel is available.

== Berlinite ==
AlPO_{4} is isoelectronic with Si_{2}O_{4}, silicon dioxide. Berlinite looks like quartz and has a structure that is similar to quartz with silicon replaced by Al and P. The AlO_{4} and PO_{4} tetrahedra alternate. Like quartz, AlPO_{4} exhibits chirality and piezoelectric properties. When heated, crystalline AlPO_{4} (berlinite) converts to tridymite and cristobalite forms, and this mirrors the behaviour of silicon dioxide.

== Uses ==
=== Molecular sieves ===
There are many types of aluminium phosphate molecular sieves, generically known as "ALPOs". The first ones were reported in 1982. They all share the same chemical composition of AlPO_{4} and have framework structures with microporous cavities. The frameworks are made up of alternating AlO_{4} and PO_{4} tetrahedra. The denser cavity-less crystalline berlinite, shares the same alternating AlO_{4} and PO_{4} tetrahedra. The aluminophosphate framework structures vary one from another in the orientation of the AlO_{4} tetrahedra and PO_{4} tetrahedra to form different-sized cavities, and in this respect they are similar to the aluminosilicate zeolites, which differ in having electrically charged frameworks. A typical preparation of an aluminophosphate involves the hydrothermal reaction of phosphoric acid and aluminium in the form of hydroxide, an aluminium salt such as aluminium nitrate salt or alkoxide under controlled pH in the presence of organic amines. These organic molecules act as templates (now termed structure directing agents, SDAs) to direct the growth of the porous framework.

=== Other ===
Along with aluminium hydroxide, aluminium phosphate is one of the most common immunologic adjuvants (efficiency enhancers) in vaccinations. Aluminium adjuvant use is widespread due to its cheap price, long history of use, safety and efficiency with most antigens.

Similar to aluminium hydroxide, AlPO_{4} is used as an antacid. Up to 20% of aluminium from ingested antacid salts can be absorbed from the gastrointestinal tract – despite some unverified concerns about the neurological effects of aluminium, aluminium phosphate and hydroxide salts are thought to be safe as antacids in normal use, even during pregnancy and breastfeeding.

Additional uses for AlPO_{4} in combination with or without other compounds are white colorants for pigments, corrosion inhibitors, cements and dental cements. Related compounds have also similar uses. For example, Al(H_{2}PO_{4})_{3} is used in dental cements, metal coatings, glaze compositions and refractory binders; and Al(H_{2}PO_{4})(HPO_{4}) is used cement and refractory binders and adhesives.

== Related compounds ==
AlPO_{4}·2H_{2}O dihydrate is found as the minerals variscite and meta-variscite. Aluminium phosphate dihydrate (variscite and meta-variscite) has a structure that can be regarded as an assembly of tetra- and octahedral units of phosphate anions, aluminium cations and water. Al^{3+} ions are 6-coordinate and PO^{3−}_{4} ions are 4-coordinate.

A synthetic hydrated form, AlPO_{4}·1.5H_{2}O, is also known.

== See also ==
- Phosphate minerals
