= Thiago (footballer, born November 1983) =

Brazilian footballer

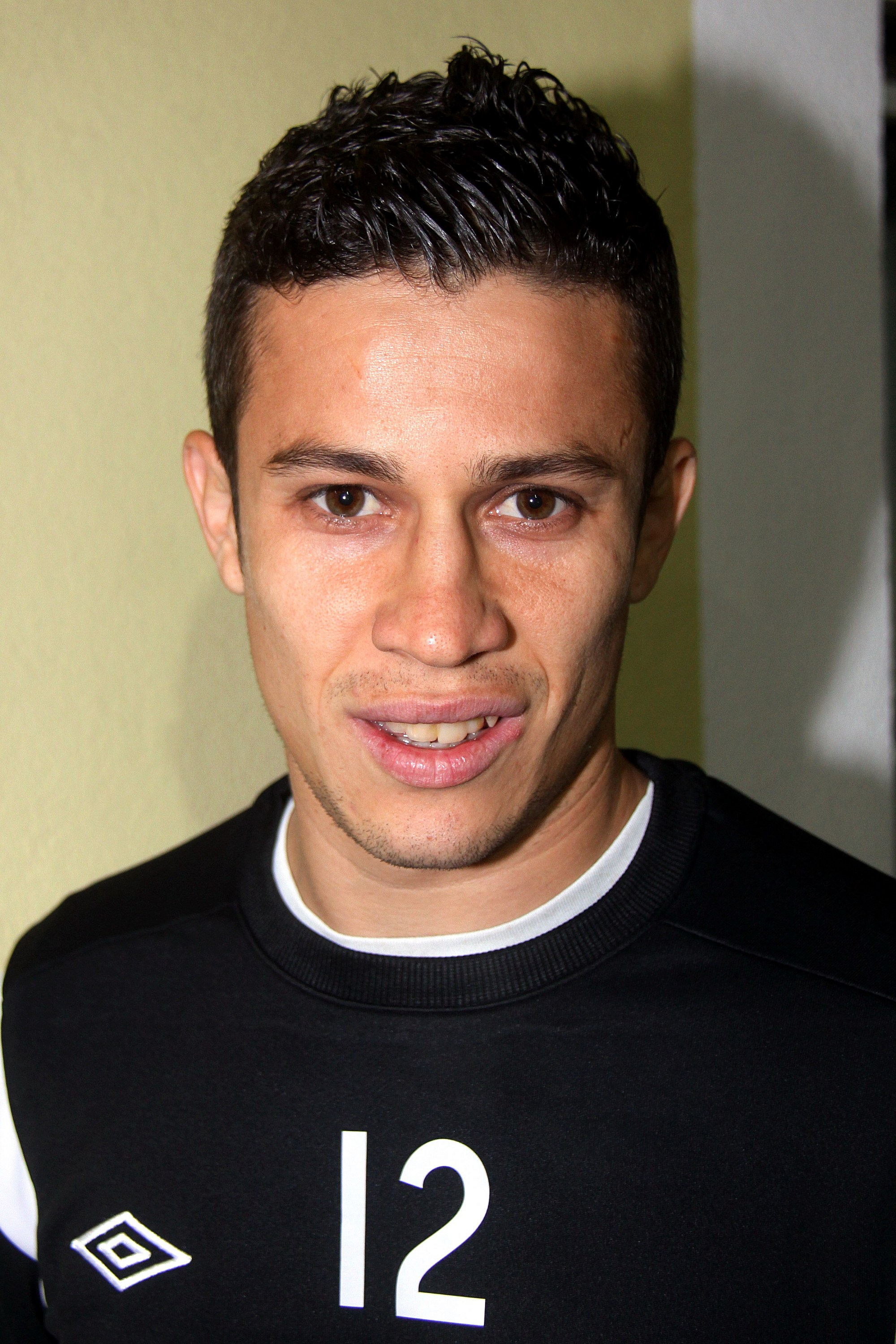
- Thiago De Lima Silva in 2013.

Personal information
- Full name: Thiago de Lima Silva
- Date of birth: November 1, 1983 (age 43)
- Place of birth: Rio do Pires
- Height: 1.80 m (5 ft 11 in)
- Position: Striker

Team information
- Current team: FC Langenegg

Senior career*
Years	Team	Apps	(Gls)
–2002	Corinthians B		
2002–2003	FC Rätia Bludenz		
2003–2004	FC Balzers		
2004–2008	SC Austria Lustenau	92	(29)
2008–2009	SV Grödig	18	(3)
2009–2010	SC/ESV Parndorf	4	(0)
2010–2012	FC Dornbirn	42	(18)
2012–2016	SC Austria Lustenau	128	(38)
2016–	FC Langenegg	0	(0)
- * Club domestic league appearances and goals as of 4 July 2016

Thiago de Lima Silva (born November 1, 1983), commonly known as Thiago, is a Brazilian footballer who currently plays as a striker for FC Langenegg.
