= Lars Fredrik Svanberg =

Swedish chemist and mineralogist

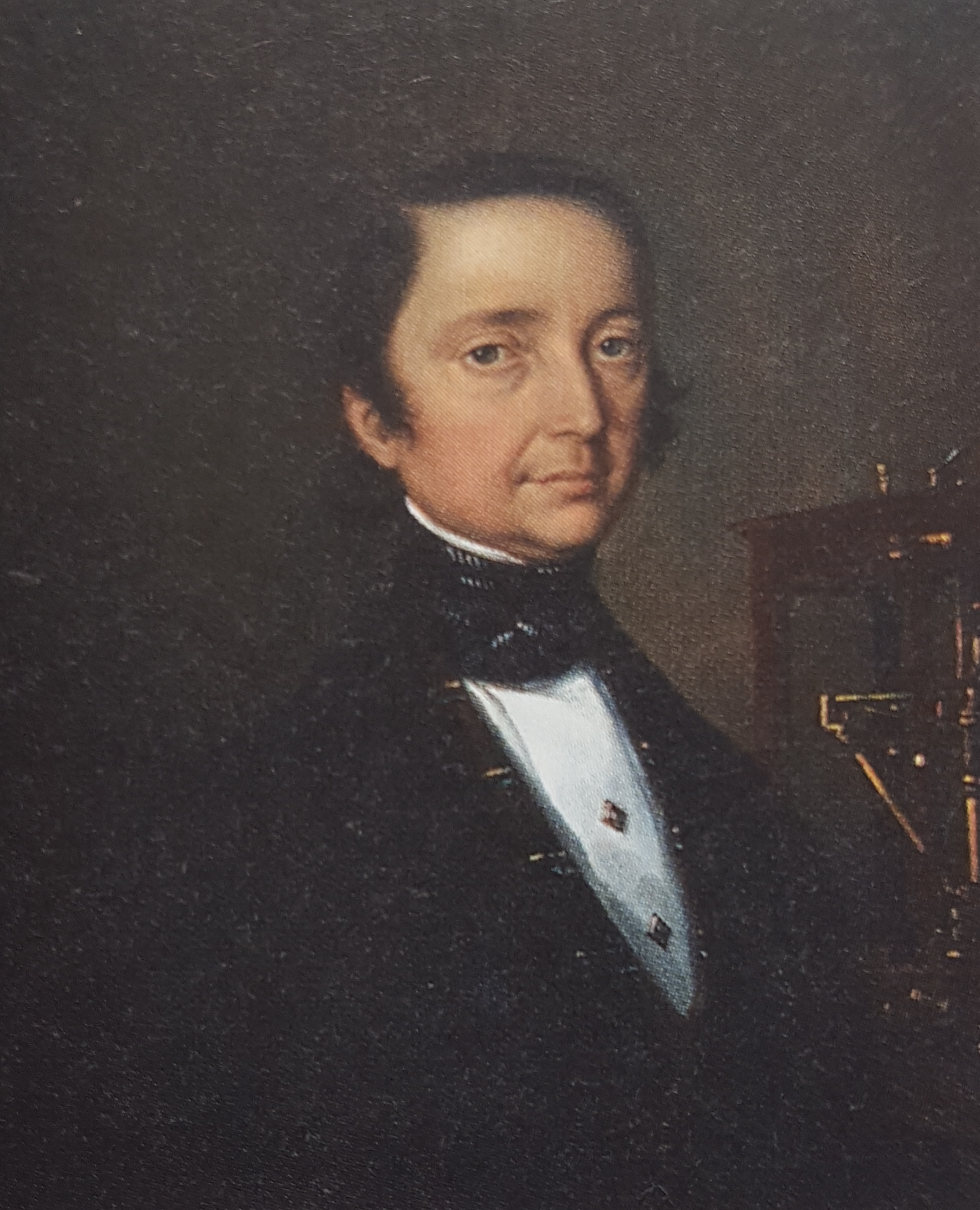
Lars Fredrik Svanberg

Lars Fredrik Svanberg (13 May 1805 – 16 July 1878) was a Swedish chemist and mineralogist.

== Life ==
He was born on 13 May 1805 in Stockholm, Sweden, as the son of Jöns Svanberg. He was married twice. In 1836, he married Augusta Roth and in 1859, Baroness Frederica Augusta Stiernstedt. He died on 16 July 1878 in Uppsala, Sweden.

== Career ==
He was a student of Jöns Jacob Berzelius. From 1853 to 1874, he was the professor of chemistry at Uppsala University.

In 1839, he became a member of the Royal Swedish Academy of Sciences.

He also had a military career, and was appointed second lieutenant in the Swedish Navy Mechanical Corps. His duties were the quality control of cannon and iron produced for the Swedish Navy.

== Honours ==
The mineral Svanbergite is named after him.
