= Satin spar =

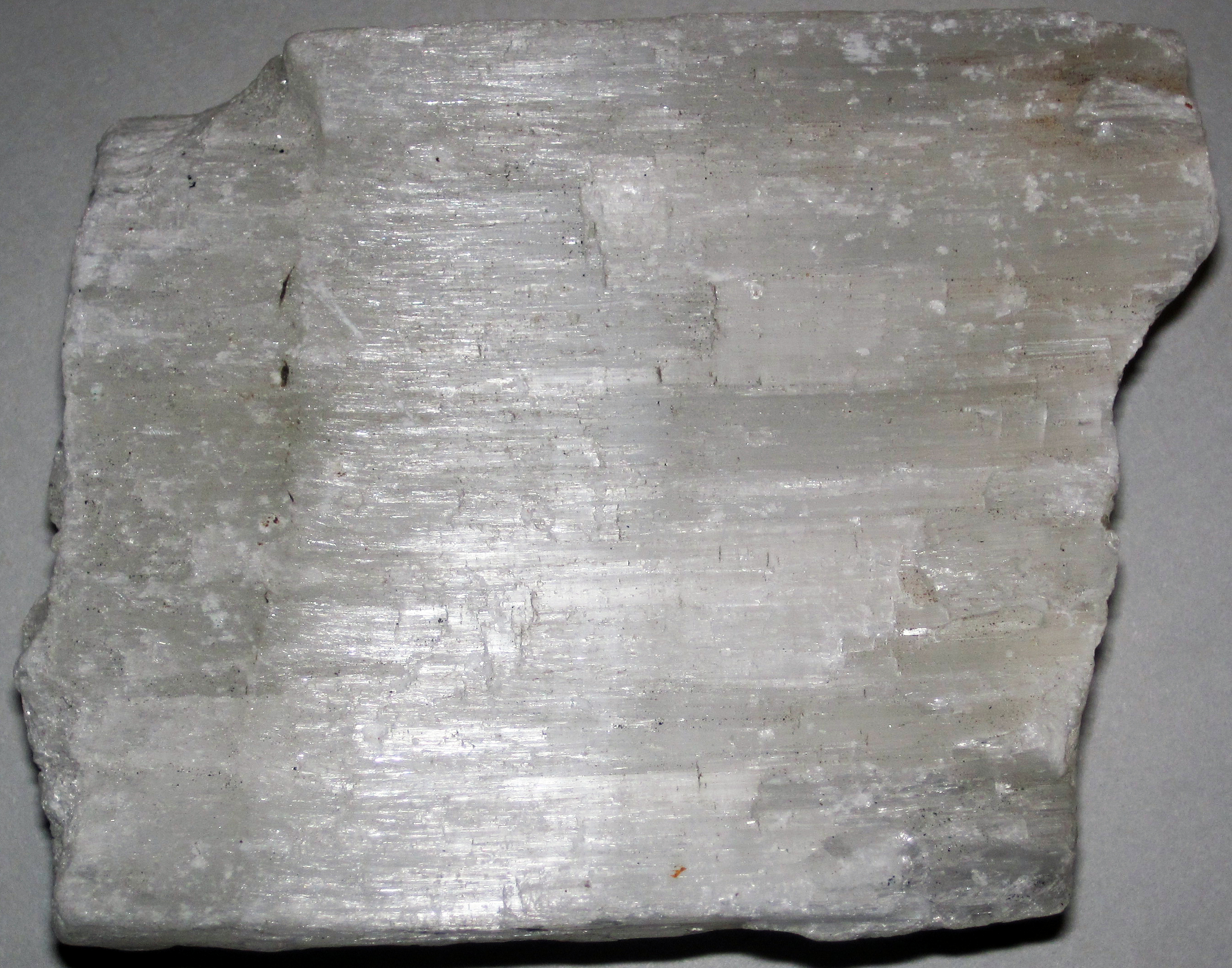
Satin spar gypsum from England

Satin spar, less commonly atlas spar, is a trivial, partly obsolete name for fibrous varieties of the minerals gypsum, calcite, and aragonite. Satin spars have a characteristic satin (silky) luster. Despite their very low hardness (2 or 3 on the Mohs scale), satin spars are widely used as ornamental stones.

Spar is a general term for glassy, transparent to translucent minerals that cleave easily. Satin spars are not related to other minerals containing spar in their names, such as feldspar and fluorspar.

== Main minerals and varieties ==
- Satin spar gypsum is a white, fibrous variety of gypsum that is sometimes called selenite.
- Satin spar calcite, or calcite spar, is a fibrous variety of calcite that superficially resembles satin spar gypsum (selenite), but is much less common in nature.
- Aragonite is one of the polymorphic varieties of calcite, sometimes having the same satin effect.

== Gallery ==
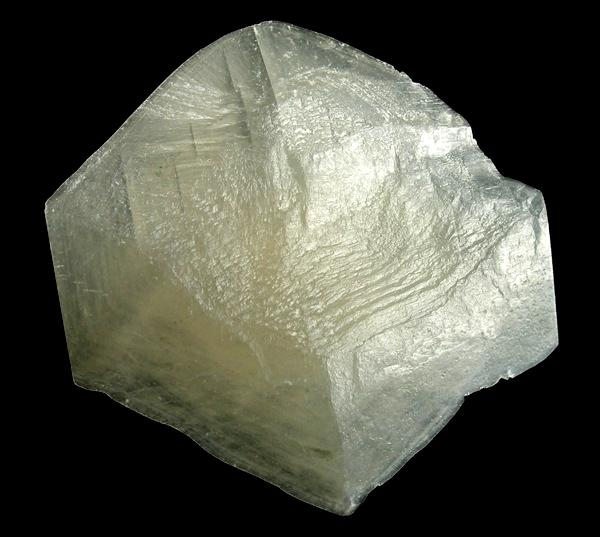
Gypsum

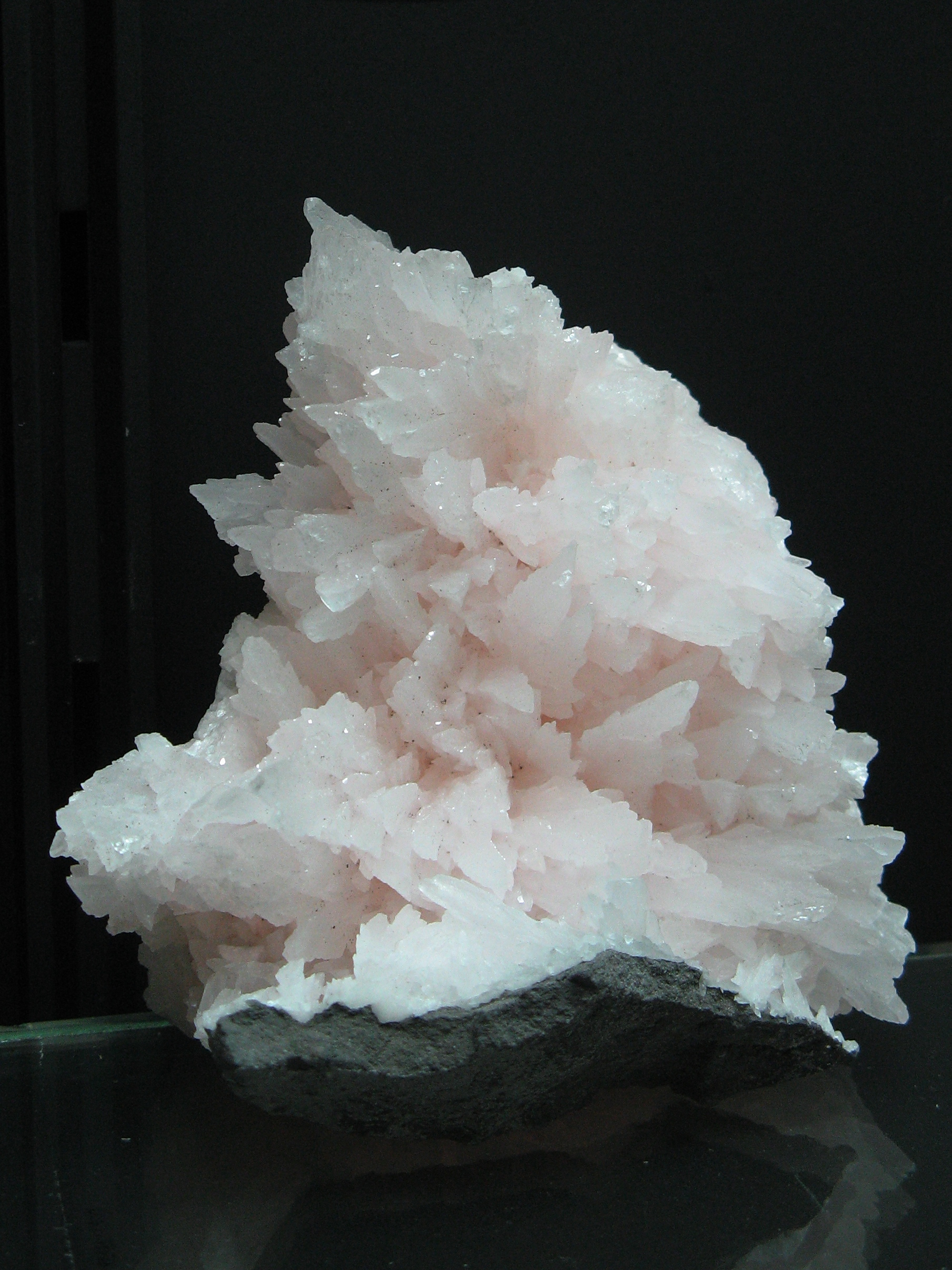
Calcite

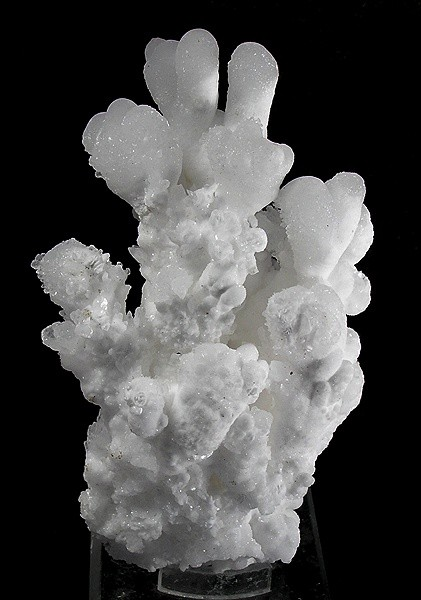
Aragonite

== See also ==
- Azure spar
- Moonstone
- Belomorite
- Albite
- Tiger's eye
