= Scorzalite =

Phosphate mineral

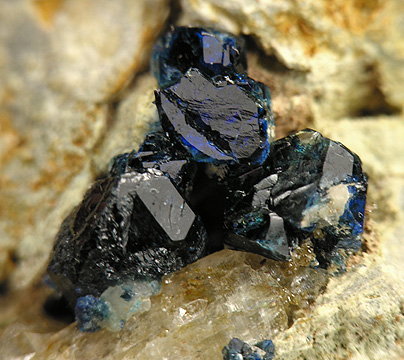
- Scorzalite from the Estaño Orcko mine, Potosí Department, Bolivia (6.8 x 5.7 x 5.1 cm)

General
- Category: Phosphate minerals
- Formula: (Fe^{2+},Mg)Al_{2}(OH,PO_{4})_{2}
- IMA symbol: Scz
- Strunz classification: 8.BB.40
- Crystal system: Monoclinic
- Crystal class: Prismatic (2/m) (same H-M symbol)
- Space group: P2/c
- Unit cell: a = 7.15 Å, b = 7.31 Å c = 7.25 Å; β = 120.58°; Z = 2

Identification
- Color: Dark blue
- Crystal habit: Granular, massive, dipyramidal crystals
- Twinning: Multiple, lamellar
- Cleavage: Good on {110}, indistinct on {101}
- Fracture: Uneven
- Mohs scale hardness: 6
- Luster: Vitreous
- Streak: White
- Diaphaneity: Semitransparent
- Specific gravity: 3.33
- Optical properties: Biaxial (−)
- Refractive index: n_{α} = 1.626 – 1.645 n_{β} = 1.654 – 1.674 n_{γ} = 1.663 – 1.680
- Birefringence: δ = 0.037
- Pleochroism: Visible X = colorless; Y = Z = blue
- 2V angle: Measured: 62°
- Dispersion: r < v perceptible

Scorzalite ((Fe^{2+},Mg)Al_{2}(OH,PO_{4})_{2}) is a dark blue phosphate mineral containing iron, magnesium, and aluminium phosphate. Scorzalite forms one endmember of a solid solution series with the lighter, more magnesium-rich lazulite.

Scorzalite crystallizes in the monoclinic system in a dipyramidal form. It has a Mohs hardness of 5.5–6 and a specific gravity of 3.4. It is infusible and insoluble in water, and only slightly soluble in warm hydrochloric acid.

== Occurrence ==
It was first described in 1947 for an occurrence in the granite pegmatite in the Córrego Frio mine, Linópolis, Doce valley, Minas Gerais, Brazil. It was named for the Brazilian geologist Everisto Pena Scorza (1899–1969).

It occurs as a secondary phase in pegmatites and kyanite (aluminium-rich) quartzites. Associated minerals include souzalite, triphylite, wyllieite, trolleite, apatite, lacroixite, berlinite, tourmaline, muscovite, feldspar and quartz.
