= Pagodite =

Type of mineral

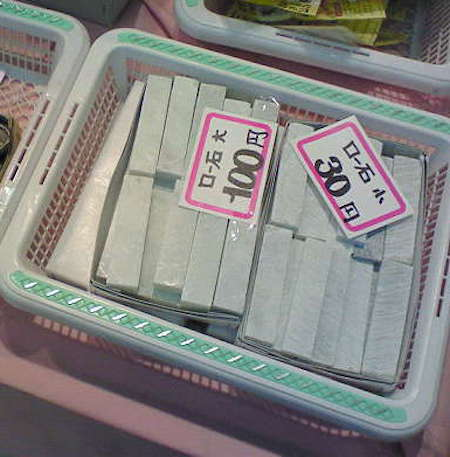
Pagodite for sale in Japan

Pagodite or agalmatolite is a variety of pyrophyllite used by Chinese artisans for carvings in pagodas and similar objects. Usually soft and sometimes soapy, it can be a greyish green or greyish yellow colour. It is sometimes also referred to (loosely) as soapstone. Small pagodite pieces are used as traditional writing tools in Japan.
