= Västanå =

- Location within Skåne Location within Sweden
- Coordinates: 56°10′N 14°29′E
- Country: Sweden
- Province: Skåne
- County: Skåne County
- Municipality: Bromölla Municipality

Area
  - Total: 0.26 km^{2} (0.10 sq mi)

Population (2000)
  - Total: 130
  - Density: 501/km^{2} (1,300/sq mi)
- Time zone: UTC+1 (CET)
  - Summer (DST): UTC+2 (CEST)

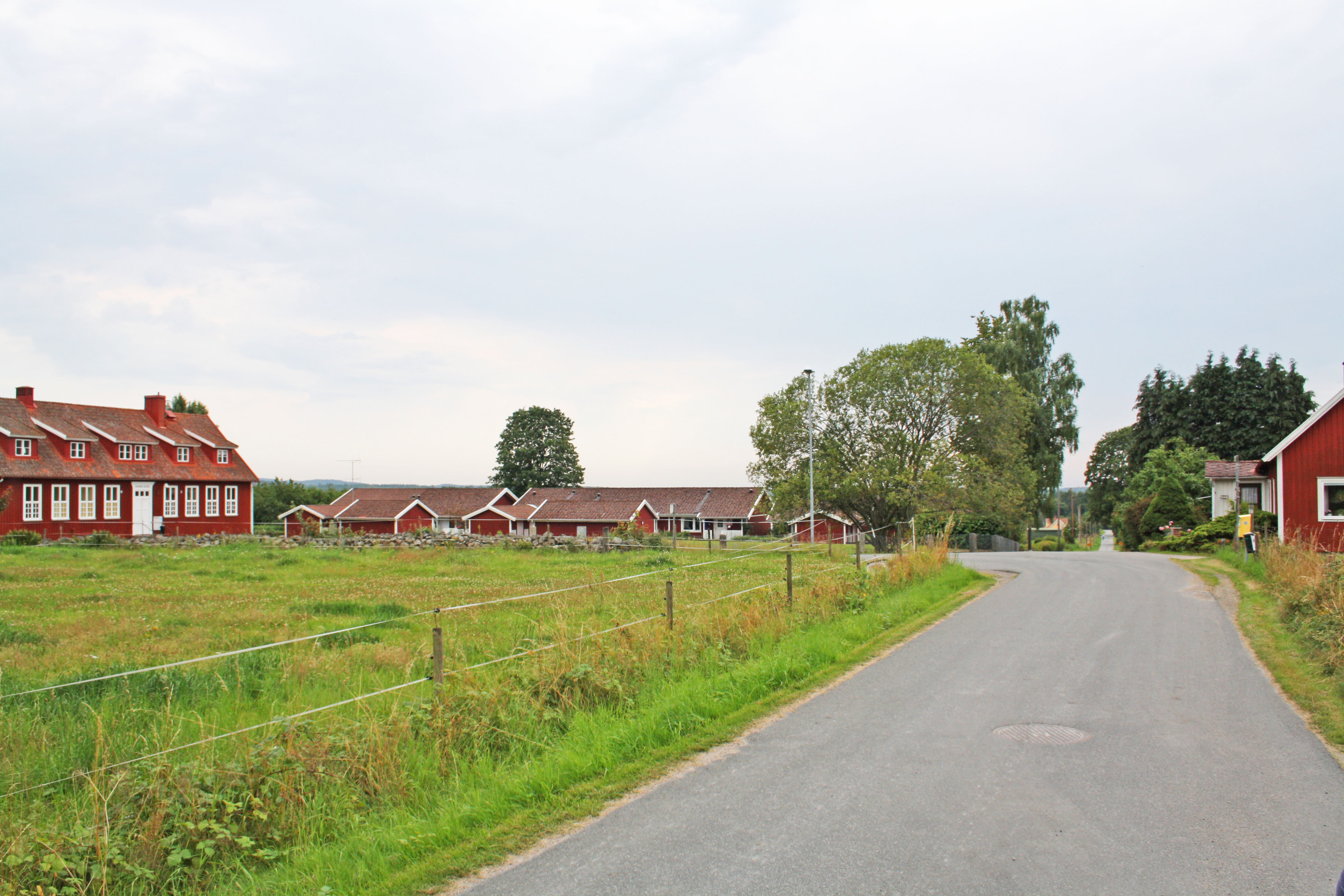
Västanå

Västanå is a village situated in Bromölla Municipality, Skåne County, Sweden with 130 inhabitants in 2005.

== Västanå iron mine ==
In 1800 an iron ore deposit was discovered and mining began in 1804. Till the closure in 1917, 1500 tonnes of iron ore were mined. Several new minerals were discovered in that mine. For example Christian Wilhelm Blomstrand discovered berlinite, trolleite, augelite, attacolite, kirrolite and westanite in 1868 in the iron mine.
