= Svanbergite =

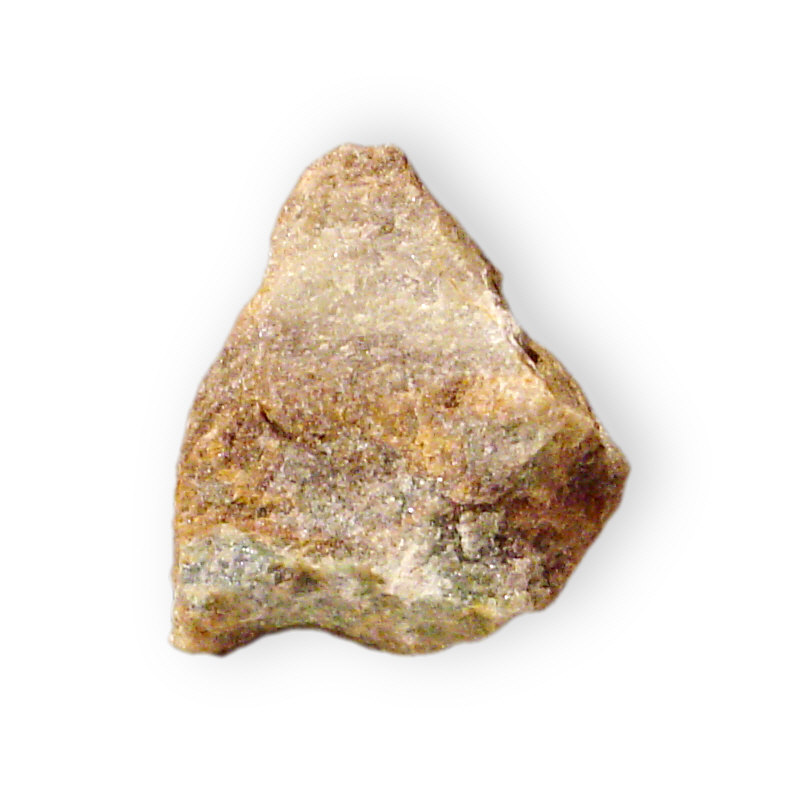
- Svanbergite with pyrophyllite and andalusite

General
- Category: Phosphate minerals
- Formula: SrAl_{3}(PO_{4})(SO_{4})(OH)_{6}
- IMA symbol: Svb
- Strunz classification: 8.BL.05
- Crystal system: Trigonal
- Crystal class: Hexagonal scalenohedral (3̅m); H-M symbol: (3̅ 2/m)
- Space group: R3̅m
- Unit cell: a = 6.970–6.992 Å c = 16.567–16.75 Å, Z = 3

Identification
- Color: Colorless, cream-yellow, rose, reddish brown
- Crystal habit: Rhombohedral crystals (to pseudocubic); granular, massive
- Cleavage: Distinct on {0001}
- Mohs scale hardness: 5
- Luster: Vitreous to adamantine
- Diaphaneity: Translucent
- Specific gravity: 3.22
- Optical properties: Uniaxial (+)
- Refractive index: n_{ω} = 1.631–1.635 n_{ε}= 1.646–1.649
- Birefringence: δ=0.0140–0.0150

Svanbergite is a colorless, yellow or reddish mineral with the chemical formula SrAl_{3}(PO_{4})(SO_{4})(OH)_{6}. It has rhombohedral crystals.

It was first described for an occurrence in Varmland, Sweden in 1854 and named for Swedish chemist Lars Fredrik Svanberg (1805–1878).

It occurs in high aluminium medium-grade metamorphic rocks; in bauxite deposits and from sulfate enriched argillic alteration (high silica and clay) associated with hydrothermal systems often replacing apatite. It occurs with pyrophyllite, kyanite, andalusite, lazulite, augelite, alunite, kaolinite and quartz.

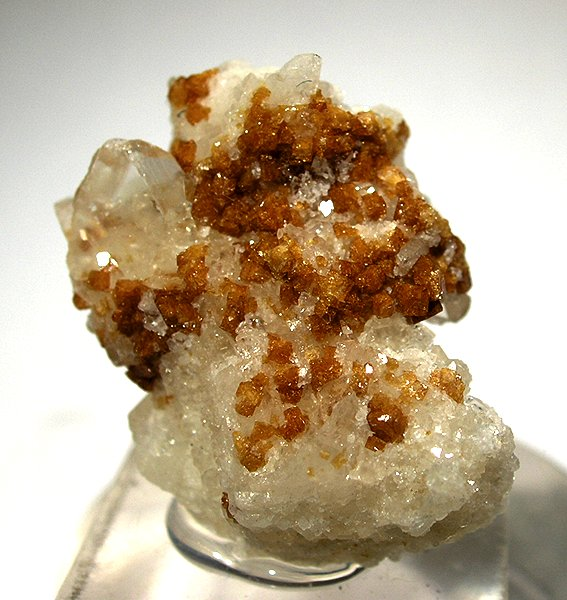
Svanbergite crystals on white dolomite from Radium Hot Springs, British Columbia, Canada (size: 3 × 2.5 × 2.1 cm)
