= Aluminium dihydrogenphosphate =

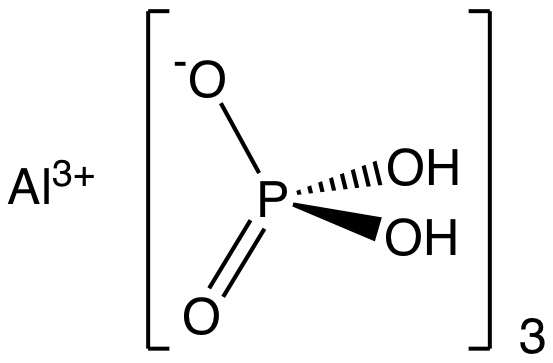

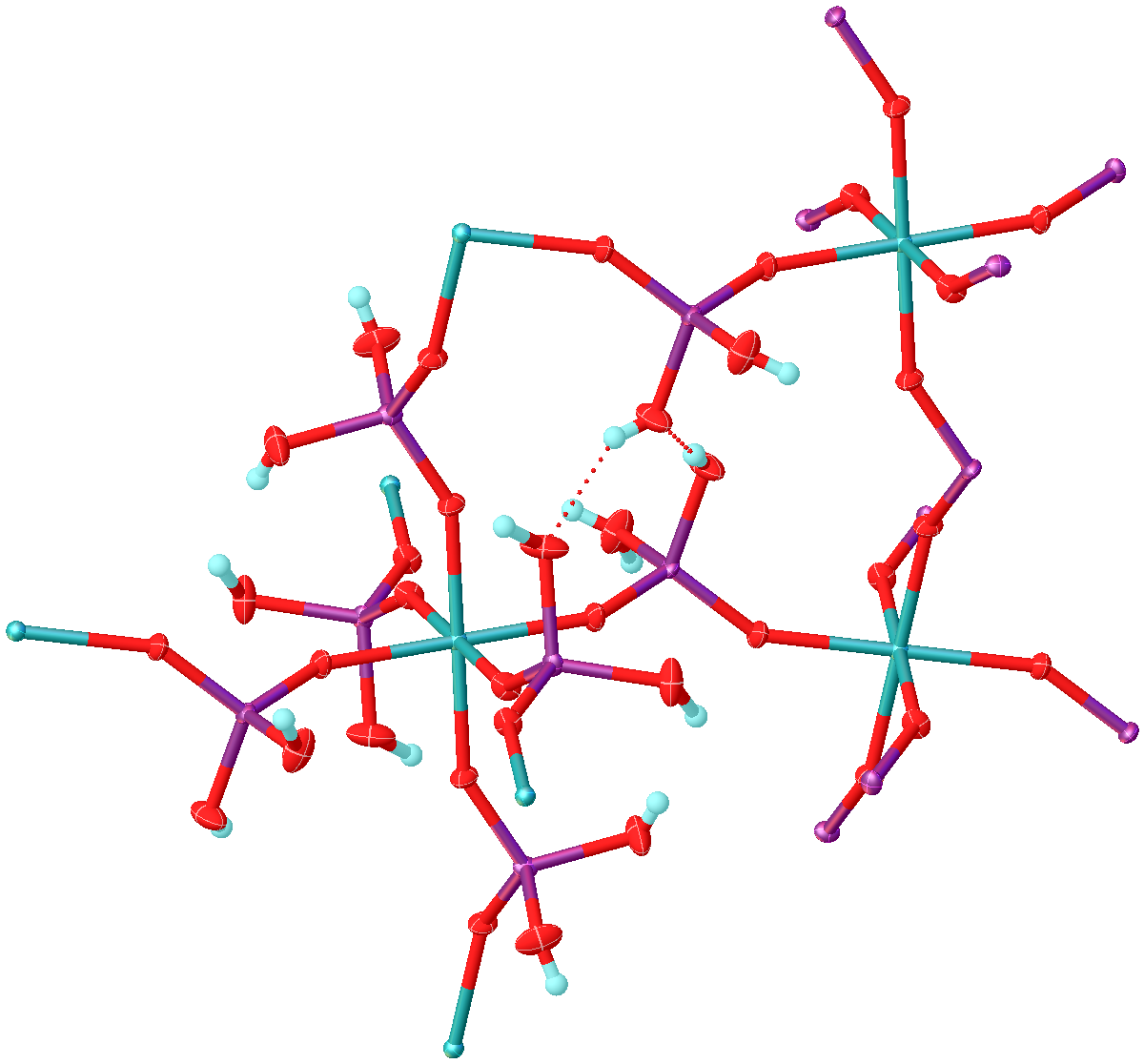

Names
- IUPAC name Aluminium dihydrogen phosphate

Identifiers
CAS Number	13530-50-2
3D model (JSmol)	Interactive image
ChemSpider	7994176
ECHA InfoCard	100.033.508
EC Number	236-875-2
PubChem CID	9818426
CompTox Dashboard (EPA)	DTXSID2094005
- InChI: InChI=1S/Al.3H3O4P/c;3*1-5(2,3)4/h;3*(H3,1,2,3,4)/q+3;;;/p-3 Key: RGPUVZXXZFNFBF-UHFFFAOYSA-K
- SMILES: OP(=O)(O)[O-].OP(=O)(O)[O-].OP(=O)(O)[O-].[Al+3]

Properties
Chemical formula	AlH_{6}O_{12}P_{3}
Molar mass	317.939 g·mol^{−1}
Appearance	white solid
Density	2.37 g/cm^{3}

Hazards
- GHS labelling
Pictograms	(GHS05: Corrosive)
Hazard statements	H318
Precautionary statements	P280, P305+P351+P338, P310
- Except where otherwise noted, data are given for materials in their standard state (at 25 °C [77 °F], 100 kPa). Infobox references

Aluminium dihydrogenphosphate describes inorganic compounds with the formula Al(H_{2}PO_{4})_{3}^{.}xH_{2}O where x = 0 or 3. They are white solids. Upon heating these materials convert sequentially to a family of related polyphosphate salts including aluminium triphosphate (AlH_{2}P_{3}O_{10}^{.}2H_{2}O), aluminium hexametaphosphate (Al_{2}P_{6}O_{18}), and aluminium tetrametaphosphate (Al_{4}(P_{4}O_{12})_{3}). Some of these materials are used for fireproofing and as ingredients in specialized glasses.

According to analysis by X-ray crystallography, the structure consists of a coordination polymer featuring octahedral Al^{3+} centers bridged by tetrahedral dihydrogen phosphate ligands. The dihydrogen phosphate ligands are bound to Al^{3+} as monodentate ligands.
