= Diadochite =

Phosphate-sulfate mineral

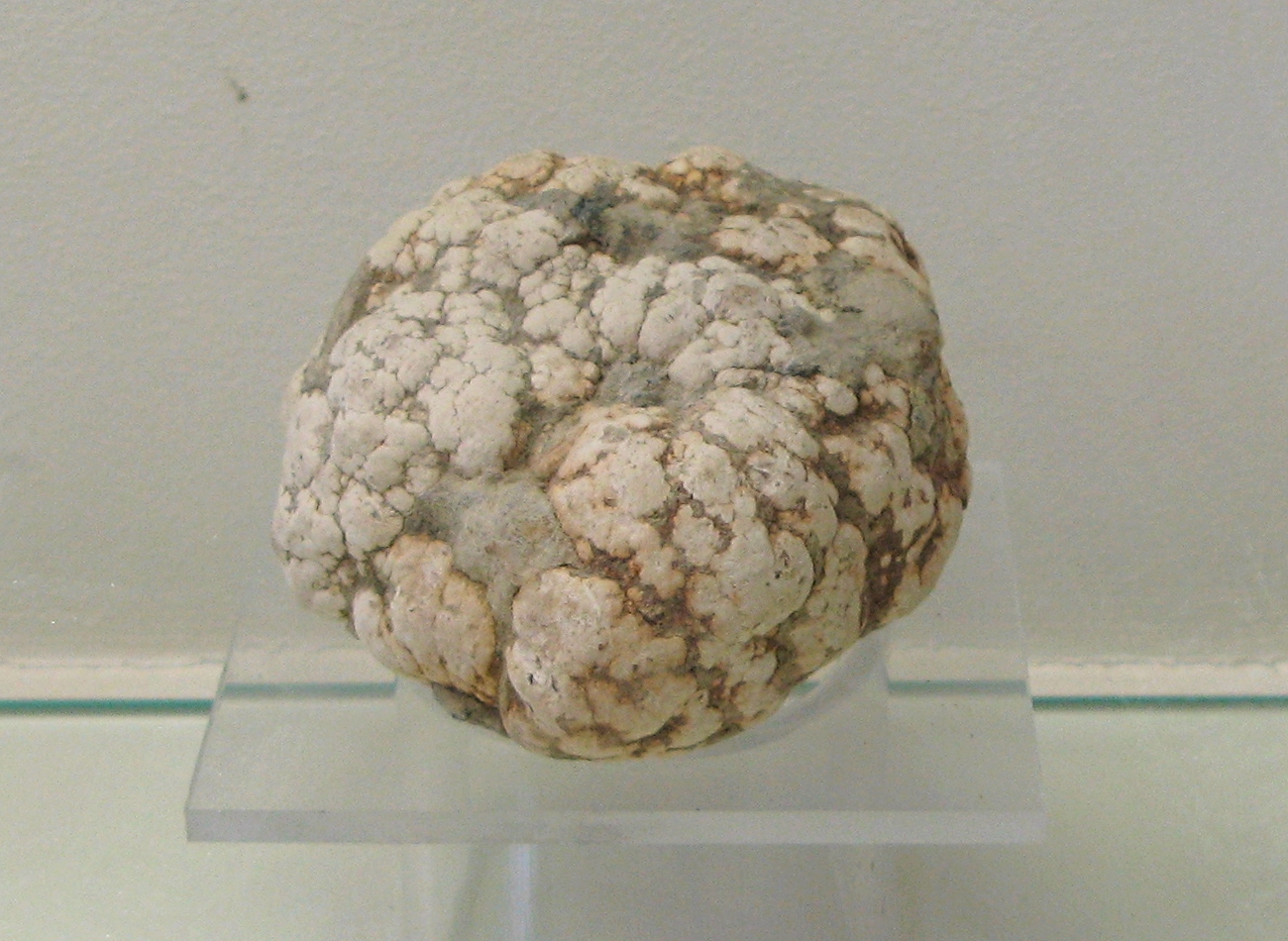
- Diadochite from Lodenitz, Bohemia

General
- Category: Phosphate minerals
- Formula: Fe_{2}(PO_{4})(SO_{4})OH·5H_{2}O
- IMA symbol: Ddc
- Strunz classification: 8.DB.05

Diadochite is a phospho-sulfate mineral. It is a secondary mineral formed by the weathering and hydration of other minerals. Its formula is Fe_{2}(PO_{4})(SO_{4})OH·5H_{2}O. Well crystallized forms are referred to as destinezite, which has been given official recognition by the International Mineralogical Association with diadochite being the poorly formed to amorphous variety.

It has a greenish yellow to brown colour and forms nodules or crusts. Its appearance has been compared to cauliflower.

Identified originally in Belgium in 1831, it has been found in many places throughout the world.

It occurs as a secondary mineral in mineral gossans, coal deposits, phosphate rich pegmatites and cave guano deposits.
