= Lazulite =

Phosphate mineral

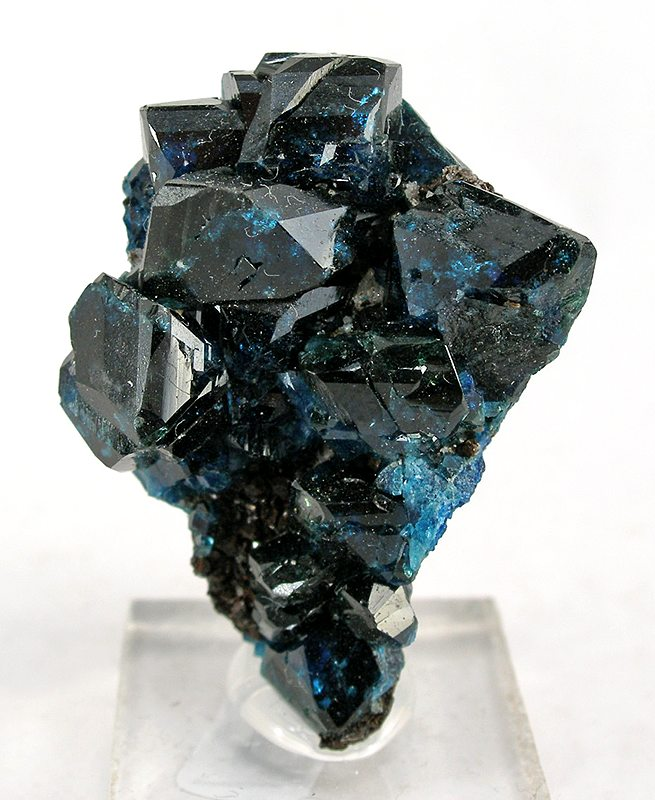
- Lazulite specimen found near Rapid Creek, Yukon, Canada

General
- Category: Phosphate mineral
- Formula: (Mg,Fe^{2+})Al_{2}(PO_{4})_{2}(OH)_{2}
- IMA symbol: Lzl
- Strunz classification: 8.BB.40
- Crystal system: Monoclinic
- Crystal class: Prismatic (2/m) (same H–M symbol)
- Space group: P2_{1}/c
- Unit cell: a = 7.144(1), b = 7.278(1) c = 7.228(1) [Å]; β = 120.5(1)°; Z = 2

Identification
- Color: Azure, sky blue, bluish white, yellow-green, blue-green, rarely green
- Crystal habit: Tabular, acute to stubby bipyramidal crystals; granular, massive
- Twinning: Common by several twin laws
- Cleavage: Poor to good on {110}, indistinct on {101}
- Fracture: Uneven, splintery
- Tenacity: Brittle
- Mohs scale hardness: 5.5–6.0
- Luster: Vitreous
- Streak: White
- Diaphaneity: Transparent to translucent to nearly opaque
- Specific gravity: 3.122–3.240
- Optical properties: Biaxial (−)
- Refractive index: n_{α} = 1.604–1.626 n_{β} = 1.626–1.654 n_{γ} = 1.637–1.663
- Birefringence: δ = 0.033–0.037
- Pleochroism: Strong: X = colorless, Y = blue, Z = darker blue
- 2V angle: Measured: 61–70°
- Fusibility: Infusible
- Solubility: Insoluble

Lazulite or Azure spar is a transparent to semi-opaque, blue mineral that is a phosphate of magnesium, iron, and aluminium, with the chemical formula (Mg,Fe^{2+})Al_{2}(PO_{4})_{2}(OH)_{2}. Lazulite forms one endmember of a solid solution series with the darker, iron-rich scorzalite.

Lazulite crystallizes in the monoclinic system. Its crystal habits include steep bipyramidal or wedge-shaped crystals. Lazulite has a Mohs hardness of 5.5–6.0 and a specific gravity of 3.0–3.1. It is infusible and insoluble.

== Occurrence and discovery ==
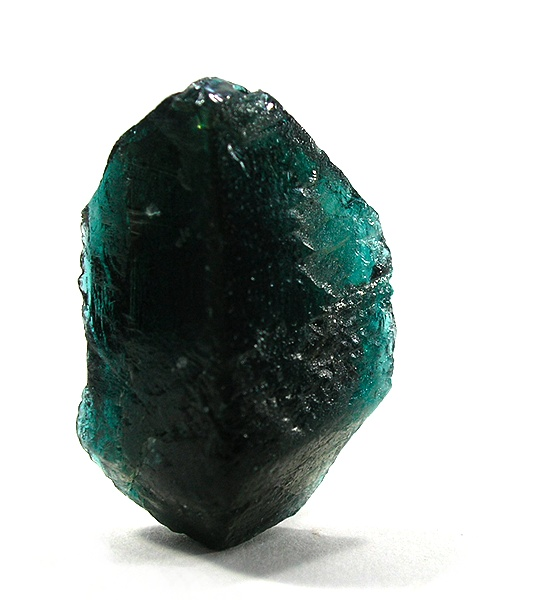
Lazulite from Laila,(Village Dasso) Kutwal Valley Haramosh Gilgit District, Gilgit-Baltistan, Pakistan. Size: 2.4 cm × 1.7 cm × 0.8 cm (0.94 in × 0.67 in × 0.31 in).

Lazulite forms by high-grade metamorphism of silica-rich rocks and in pegmatites. It occurs in association with quartz, andalusite, rutile, kyanite, corundum, muscovite, pyrophyllite, dumortierite, wagnerite, svanbergite, trolleite, and berlinite in metamorphic terrains; and with albite, quartz, muscovite, tourmaline, and beryl in pegmatites. It may often be confused with lazurite, lapis lazuli, or azurite.

The type locality is in Freßnitzgraben in Krieglach; it is also found in Salzburg, Austria; Zermatt, Switzerland; Minas Gerais, Brazil; Lincoln County, Georgia; Inyo County, California; the Yukon in Canada; and elsewhere.

It was first described in 1795 for deposits in Styria, Austria. Its name comes from the German lazurstein, for 'blue stone', or from the Arabic for heaven.
