= Azure spar =

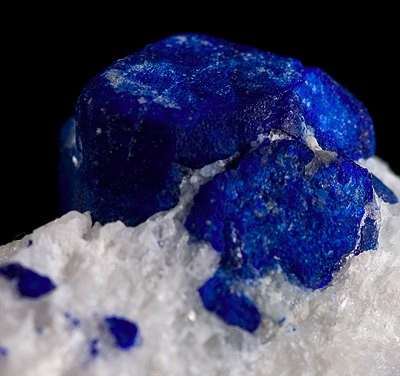
- Lazurite (Badakhshan)

General
- Category: Minerals

Azure spar, sometimes azur-spar, is a trivial, commercial, and partly obsolete name for several of the most famous bright blue or blue-colored minerals, which also have similar names, most notably for lazurite and azurite, and also for the less commonly used lazulite.

In addition, Robert Jameson in his fundamental works of 1804-1821 also included hauyne as a separate mineral species and the so-called “calaite”, which in the 1820s meant only turquoise, among the azure feldspars.

All of the listed minerals are known primarily as ornamental stones, and have historically been used as painting pigments and dyes for various purposes. More than others, lazurite or lapis lazuli has historically had a decorative use, classified by A. Fersman and M. Bauer as a first-order semi-precious ornamental stone. Haüyne is valued significantly higher than lapis lazuli, but it is rarely found in jewelry quality suitable for cutting. Azurite or copper azure is much less often used as an ornamental stone due to its fragility and chemical instability, but this mineral has been known since ancient times as a pigment for blue tempera paint, mainly in icon painting. Finally, lazulite is sometimes used not only as an ornamental stone, but also for jewelry cutting, although finds of high-quality raw materials are too rare for its mass use. As for turquoise, it has been one of the most popular ornamental and semi-precious stones since ancient times.

== Main minerals ==
- Lazurite or lapis lazuli is an opaque mineral, sodium aluminosilicate sulfate with the ideal formula Na[(AlSiO_{4})SO_{4}], having a color from blue to bluish- or greenish-gray, was previously widely known as azure spar.
- Haüyne or prismatic azure spar is a transparent or translucent mineral, similar to lazurite, in composition sodium and calcium aluminosilicate with the ideal formula (Na,Ca)_{4-8}Al_{6}Si_{6}(O,S)_{24}(SO_{4},Cl)_{1-2} having a blue or blue color, sometimes with a greenish tint, was also known among the azure spars.
- Azurite or copper azure is an opaque or slightly translucent mineral, copper carbonate-hydroxide in composition with the ideal formula Cu_{3}(СО_{3})_{2}(ОН)_{2}, having a bright blue color, one of the most common secondary minerals containing copper, also known as azure spar.
- Lazulite or azure spar is a transparent or translucent mineral, in composition a hydrous phosphate of iron, magnesium and aluminum with the ideal formula (Mg,Fe^{2+})Al_{2}(OH,PO_{4})_{2}, having a beautiful sky-blue, light blue or bluish color, known as azure spar.
- Turquoise or kalaite is a widely known opaque mineral, which is a hydrated phosphate of aluminum and copper with the ideal formula CuAl_{6}[PO_{4}]_{4}(OH)_{8}·5H_{2}O, and is also included among the azure feldspars.

== Gallery ==
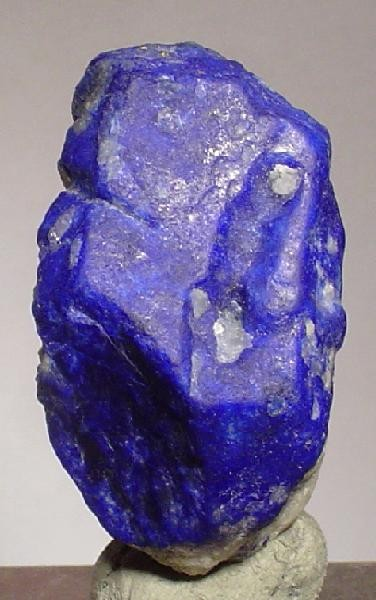
Lazurite

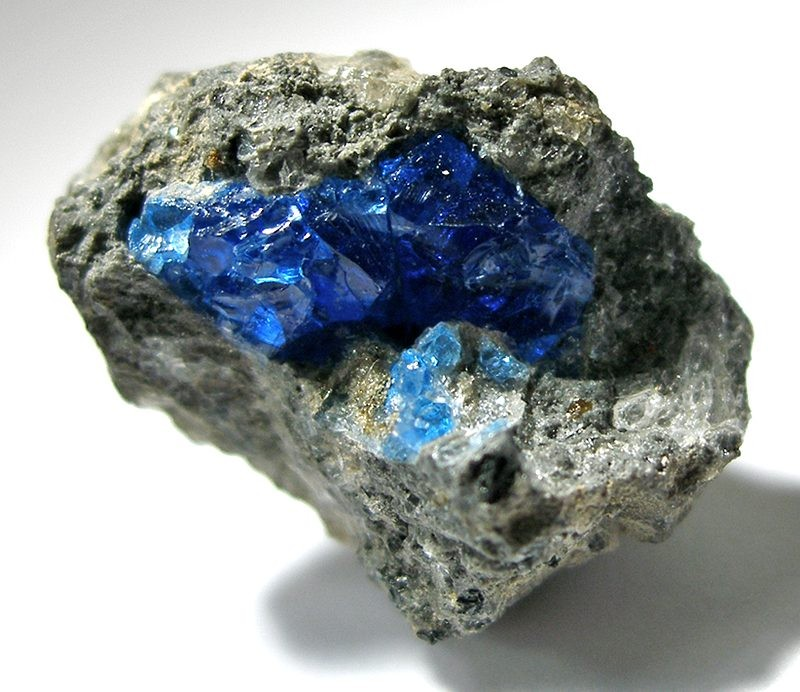
Hauyne

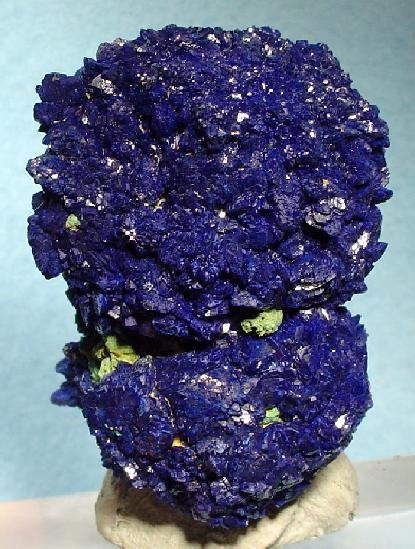
Azurite

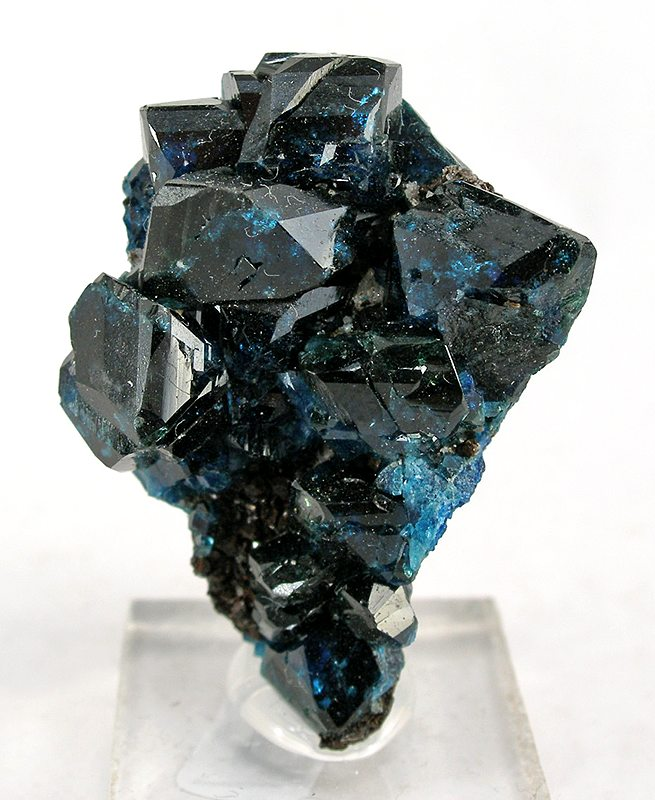
Lazulite

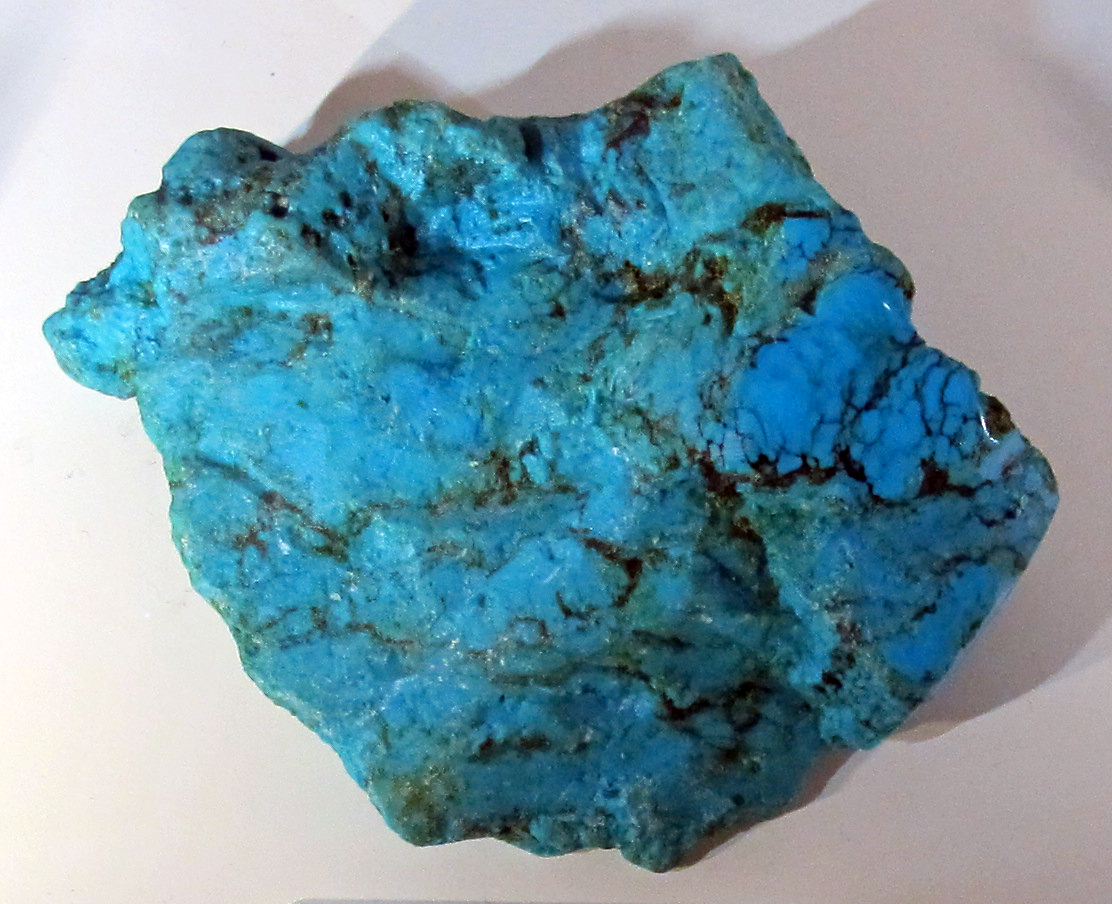
Turquoise

== See also ==
- Feldspars
- Satin spar
- Blue pigments
- Hauyne
- Ultramarine
- Azurite
