= Rio do Pires =

Coordinates: 13°07′S 42°18′W

- Municipality
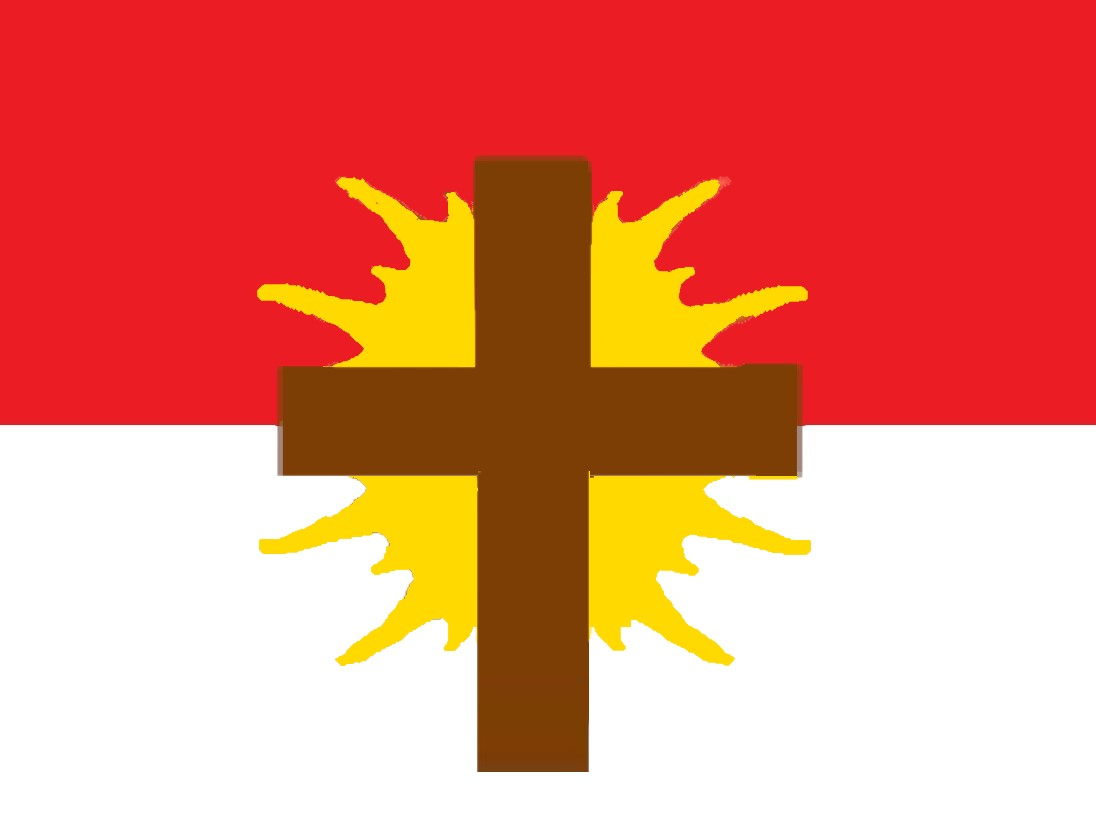
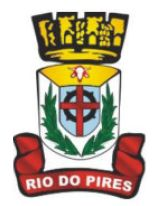
- Flag Coat of arms
- Interactive map of Rio do Pires
- Country: Brazil
- Region: Nordeste
- State: Bahia

Population (2020)
  - Total: 11,663
- Time zone: UTC−3 (BRT)

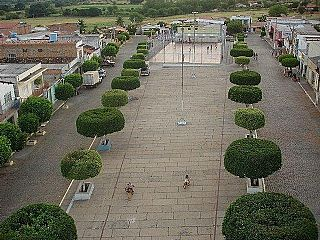
Central Square of the Municipality of Rio do Pires, Brazil

Rio do Pires is a municipality in the state of Bahia in the North-East region of Brazil.

== See also ==
- List of municipalities in Bahia
