= Ibitiara =

Municipality of Bahia, Brazil

Coordinates: 12.6519°S 42.2178°W

- Municipality
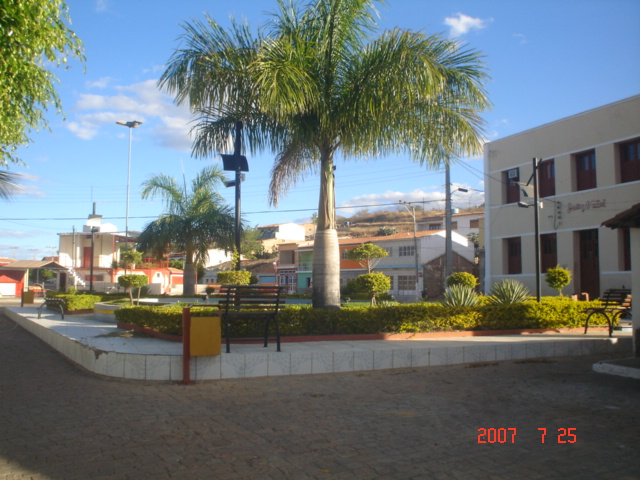

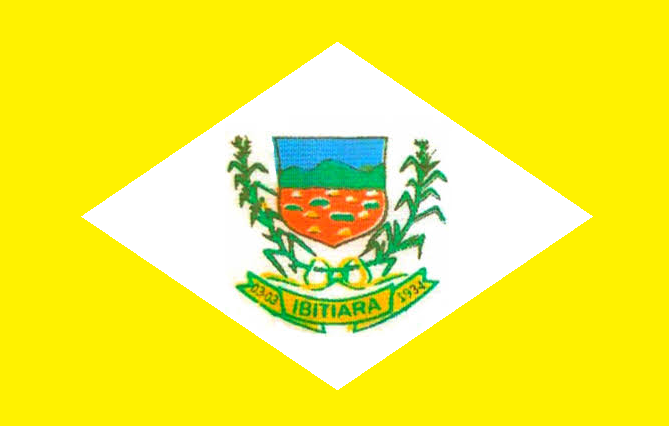
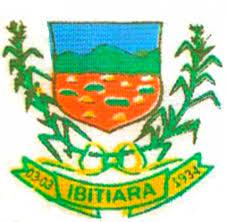
- Flag Coat of arms
- Interactive map of Ibitiara
- Country: Brazil
- Region: Nordeste
- State: Bahia

Population (2020)
  - Total: 16,403
- Time zone: UTC -3

Ibitiara is a municipality in the state of Bahia in the North-East region of Brazil.

== See also ==
- List of municipalities in Bahia
