= Pyrophyllite =

Phyllosilicate mineral in the pyrophyllite-talc group

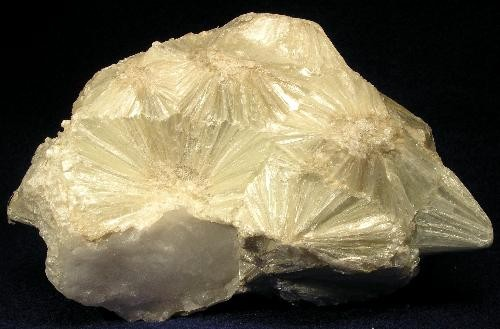
- Pearly radial cluster of pyrophyllite from Hillsborough District, Orange County, North Carolina (Size: 11 × 7.3 × 6.6 cm)

General
- Category: Phyllosilicate minerals
- Group: Pyrophyllite-Talc group
- Formula: Al_{2}Si_{4}O_{10}(OH)_{2}
- IMA symbol: Prl
- Crystal system: Monoclinic or triclinic
- Crystal class: Prismatic (2/m) or pinacoidal (1̅)
- Space group: C2/c or C1̅
- Unit cell: a = 5.16 Å, b = 8.966(3) Å, c = 9.347(6) Å; α = 91.18°, β = 100.46°, γ = 89.64°; Z = 2

Identification
- Formula mass: 360.31 g/mol
- Color: Brown green, brownish yellow, greenish, gray green, gray white
- Crystal habit: Compact spherulitic aggregates of needlelike radiating crystals; as fine grained foliated laminae, granular, massive
- Cleavage: [001] Perfect
- Tenacity: Flexible inelastic
- Mohs scale hardness: 1.5–2
- Luster: Pearly to dull
- Streak: white
- Diaphaneity: Translucent to opaque
- Specific gravity: 2.65 – 2.9
- Optical properties: Biaxial (−)
- Refractive index: n_{α}=1.534–1.556, n_{β}=1.586–1.589, n_{γ}=1.596–1.601
- Birefringence: δ =0.0450–0.0620
- 2V angle: 53–62
- Fusibility: Infusible, exfoliates

Pyrophyllite is a phyllosilicate mineral composed of aluminium silicate hydroxide: Al_{2}Si_{4}O_{10}(OH)_{2}. It occurs in two forms (habits): crystalline folia and compact masses; distinct crystals are not known.

The folia have a pronounced pearly luster, owing to the presence of a perfect cleavage parallel to their surfaces: they are flexible but not elastic, and are usually arranged radially in fan-like or spherical groups. This variety, when heated, exfoliates and swells up to many times its original volume. The color of both varieties is white, pale green, greyish or yellowish; they are very soft (hardness of 1.0 to 1.5) and are greasy to the touch. The specific gravity is 2.65–2.85. The two varieties are thus very similar to talc.

== Occurrence ==
Pyrophyllite occurs in phyllite and schistose rocks, often associated with kyanite, of which it is an alteration product. It also occurs as hydrothermal deposits. Typical associated minerals include: kyanite, andalusite, topaz, mica and quartz.

Deposits containing well-crystallized material are found in:

- Manuels, Newfoundland and Labrador, Canada, talc-like bright white appearance, high grade, no impurities; 21 million ton deposit.
- Russia – pale green foliated masses, very like talc in appearance, are found at Beresovsk near Yekaterinburg in the Urals.
- St. Niklas, Zermatt, Valais, Switzerland
- Vaastana, Kristianstad, Sweden
- Near Ottrje, Ardennes Mountains, Belgium
- Ibitiara, Bahia, Brazil
- Nagano Prefecture, Japan
- Near Ogilby, Imperial County at Tres Cerritos, Mariposa County, and the Champion mine, White Mountains, Mono County, California, US
- Near Quartzsite, La Paz County, Arizona, US
- Large deposits at the Deep River region of North Carolina, US
- Graves Mountain, Lincoln County, Georgia, US

In South Africa, major deposits of pyrophyllite occur within the Ottosdal region, where it is mined for the production of a variety of manufactured goods, and blocks are quarried and marketed as "Wonderstone" for the carving of sculptures.

== Uses ==
The compact variety of pyrophyllite is used for slate pencils and tailors' chalk (French chalk), and is carved by the Chinese into small images and ornaments of various kinds. Other soft compact minerals (steatite and pinite) used for these Chinese carvings are included with pyrophyllite under the terms agalmatolite and pagodite.

Pyrophyllite is easily machineable and has excellent thermal stability, so it is added to clay to reduce thermal expansion when firing, but it has many other industrial uses when combined with other compounds, such as in insecticide and for making bricks. Pyrophyllite is also widely used in high-pressure experiments, both as a gasket material and as a pressure-transmitting medium.

== See also ==
- Talc – Phyllosilicate mineral in the pyrophyllite-talc group
