= Plagioclase =

Feldspar mineral series

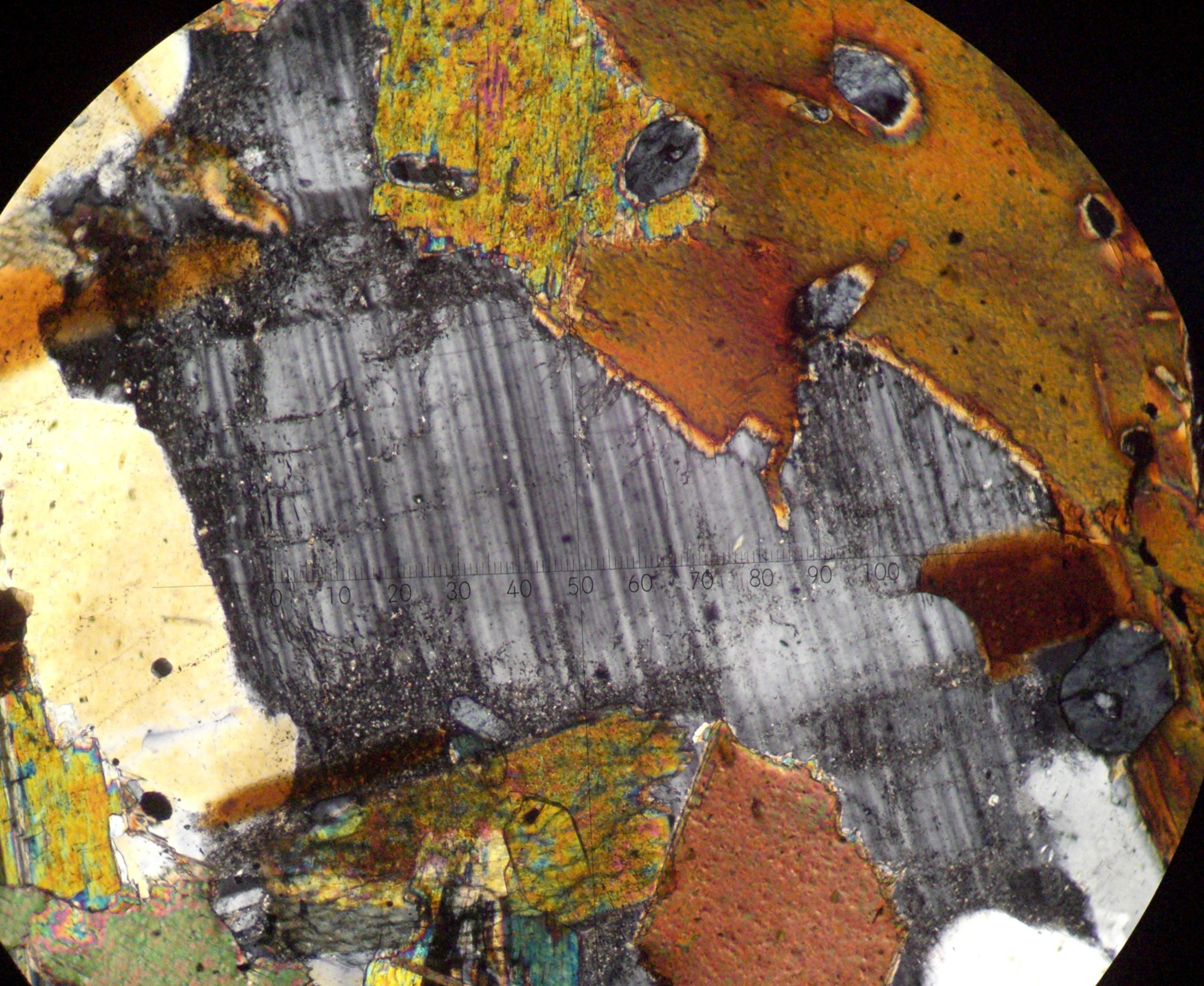
- A photomicrograph of a plagioclase crystal (gray) under cross polarized light. The plagioclase crystal shows a distinct banding effect called polysynthetic twinning.

General
- Category: Tectosilicate minerals
- Group: Feldspar group
- Formula: NaAlSi_{3}O_{8} – CaAl_{2}Si_{2}O_{8}
- IMA symbol: Pl
- IMA status: Mineral series
- Crystal system: Triclinic
- Crystal class: Pinacoidal (1̅)
- Space group: P1̅ (no. 2)

Identification
- Color: White, gray, or bluish white
- Mohs scale hardness: 6–6.5
- Luster: Vitreous
- Streak: White
- Diaphaneity: Transparent to translucent
- Specific gravity: 2.62 (albite) to 2.76 (anorthite)
- Optical properties: Biaxial (+) albite, biaxial (-) anorthite
- Refractive index: Albite: n_{α} 1.527, n_{β} 1.532 n_{γ} 1.538; Anorthite: n_{α} 1.577 n_{β} 1.585 n_{γ} 1.590
- Solubility: Albite insoluble in HCl, anorthite decomposed by HCl

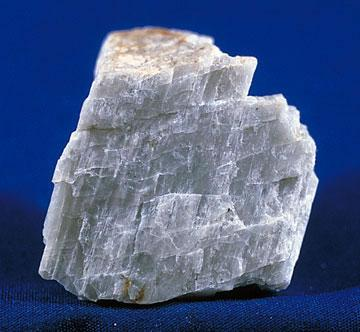
Plagioclase displaying cleavage (unknown scale)

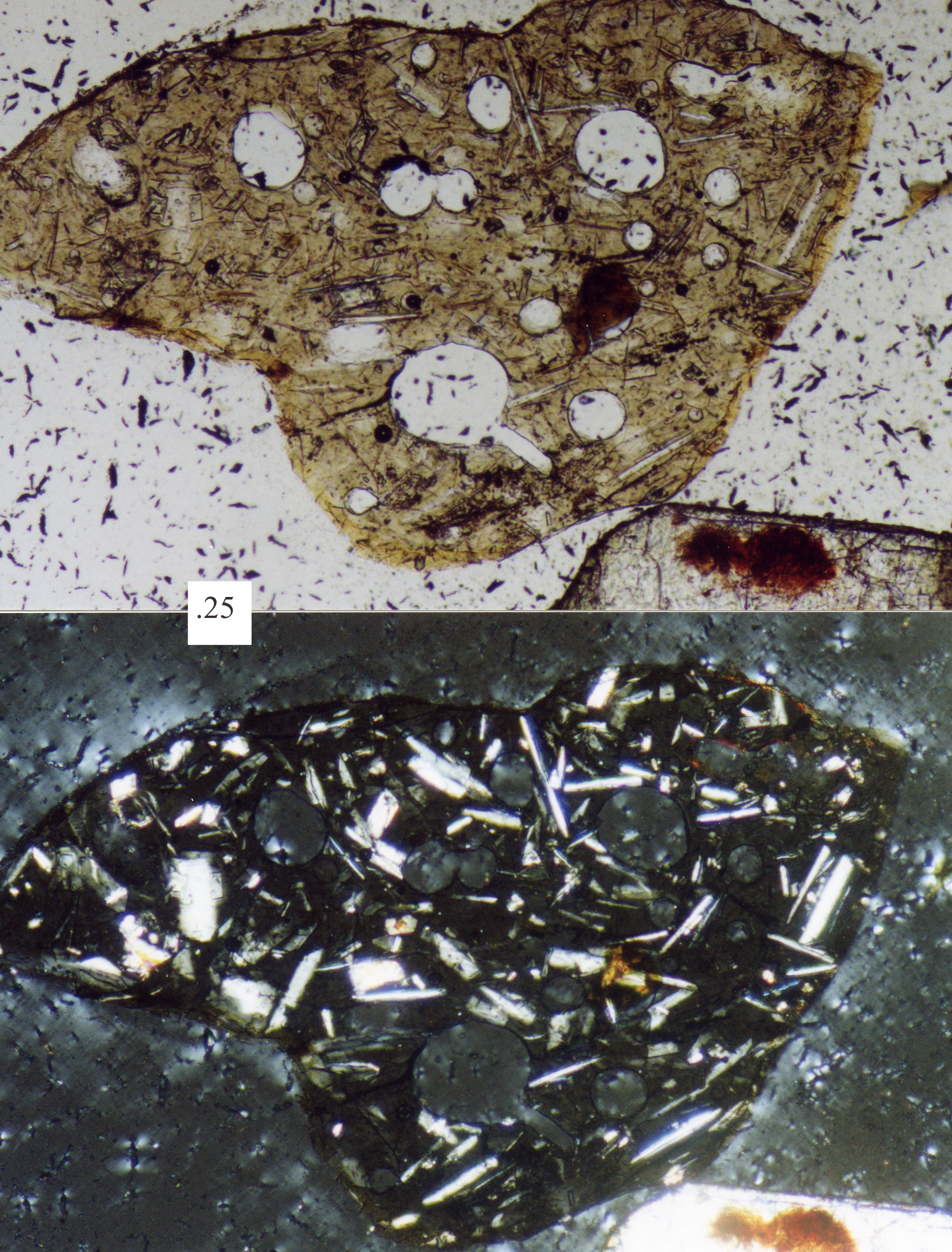
In volcanic rocks, fine-grained plagioclase can display a "microlitic" texture of many small crystals.

Plagioclase (/ˈplædʒ(i)əˌkleɪs, ˈpleɪdʒ-, -ˌkleɪz/ PLAJ-(ee)-ə-klayss, PLAYJ-, -klayz) is a series of tectosilicate (framework silicate) minerals within the feldspar group. Rather than referring to a particular mineral with a specific chemical composition, plagioclase is a continuous solid solution series, more properly known as the plagioclase feldspar series. This was first shown by the German mineralogist Johann Friedrich Christian Hessel (1796–1872) in 1826. The series ranges from albite to anorthite endmembers (with respective compositions NaAlSi_{3}O_{8} to CaAl_{2}Si_{2}O_{8}), where sodium and calcium atoms can substitute for each other in the mineral's crystal lattice structure. Plagioclase in hand samples is often identified by its polysynthetic crystal twinning or "record-groove" effect (a band system of fine, parallel striations).

Plagioclase is a major constituent mineral in Earth's crust and is consequently an important diagnostic tool in petrology for identifying the composition, origin and evolution of igneous rocks. Plagioclase is also a major constituent of rock in the highlands of the Moon. Analysis of thermal emission spectra from the surface of Mars suggests that plagioclase is the most abundant mineral in the crust of Mars.

Its name comes from Ancient Greek πλάγιος (plágios) 'oblique' and κλάσις (klásis) 'fracture', in reference to its two cleavage angles.

== Properties ==
Plagioclase is the most common and abundant mineral group in the Earth's crust. Part of the feldspar family of minerals, it is abundant in igneous and metamorphic rock, and it is also common as a detrital mineral in sedimentary rock. It is not a single mineral, but is a solid solution of two end members, albite or sodium feldspar (NaAlSi_{3}O_{8}) and anorthite or calcium feldspar (CaAl_{2}Si_{2}O_{8}). These can be present in plagioclase in any proportion from pure anorthite to pure albite. The composition of plagioclase can thus be written as Na_{1−x}Ca_{x}Al_{1+x}Si_{3−x}O_{8} where x ranges from 0 for pure albite to 1 for pure anorthite. This solid solution series is known as the plagioclase series. The composition of a particular sample of plagioclase is customarily expressed as the mol% of anorthite in the sample. For example, plagioclase that is 40 mol% anorthite would be described as An40 plagioclase.

The ability of albite and anorthite to form solid solutions in any proportions at elevated temperature reflects the ease with which calcium and aluminium can substitute for sodium and silicon in the plagioclase crystal structure. Although a calcium ion has a charge of +2, versus +1 for a sodium ion, the two ions have very nearly the same effective radius. The difference in charge is accommodated by the coupled substitution of aluminium (charge +3) for silicon (charge +4), both of which can occupy tetrahedral sites (surrounded by four oxygen ions). This contrasts with potassium, which has the same charge as sodium, but is a significantly larger ion. As a result of the size and charge difference between potassium and calcium, there is a very wide miscibility gap between anorthite and potassium feldspar, (KAlSi_{3}O_{8}), the third common rock-forming feldspar end member. Potassium feldspar does form a solid solution series with albite, due to the identical charges of sodium and potassium ions, which is known as the alkali feldspar series. Thus, almost all feldspar found on Earth is either plagioclase or alkali feldspar, with the two series overlapping for pure albite. When a plagioclase composition is described by its anorthite mol% (such as An40 in the previous example) it is assumed that the remainder is albite, with only a minor component of potassium feldspar.

Plagioclase of any composition shares many basic physical characteristics, while other characteristics vary smoothly with composition. The Mohs hardness of all plagioclase species is 6 to 6.5, and cleavage is perfect on [001] and good on [010], with the cleavage planes meeting at an angle of 93 to 94 degrees. It is from this slightly oblique cleavage angle that plagioclase gets its name, Ancient Greek plágios (πλάγιος 'oblique') + klásis (κλάσις 'fracture'). The name was introduced by August Breithaupt in 1847. There is also a poor cleavage on [110] rarely seen in hand samples.

The luster is vitreous to pearly and the diaphaneity is transparent to translucent. The tenacity is brittle, and the fracture is uneven or conchoidal, but the fracture is rarely observed due to the strong tendency of the mineral to cleave instead. At low temperature, the crystal structure belongs to the triclinic system, space group P1̅ Well-formed crystals are rare and are most commonly sodic in composition. Well-shaped samples are instead typically cleavage fragments. Well-formed crystals are typically bladed or tabular parallel to [010].

Plagioclase is usually white to greyish-white in color, with a slight tendency for more calcium-rich samples to be darker. Impurities can infrequently tint the mineral greenish, yellowish, or flesh-red. Ferric iron (Fe^{3+}) gives a pale yellow color in plagioclase feldspar from Lake County, Oregon. The specific gravity increases smoothly with calcium content, from 2.62 for pure albite to 2.76 for pure anorthite, and this can provide a useful estimate of composition if measured accurately. The index of refraction likewise varies smoothly from 1.53 to 1.58, and, if measured carefully, this also gives a useful composition estimate.

Plagioclase almost universally shows a characteristic polysynthetic twinning that produces twinning striations on [010]. These striations allow plagioclase to be distinguished from alkali feldspar. Plagioclase often also displays Carlsbad, Baveno, and Manebach Law twinning.

== Plagioclase series members ==
The composition of a plagioclase feldspar is typically denoted by its overall fraction of anorthite (%An) or albite (%Ab). There are several named plagioclase feldspars that fall between albite and anorthite in the series. The following table shows their compositions in terms of constituent anorthite and albite percentages.

Plagioclase minerals and their compositions
Name	% CaAl_{2}Si_{2}O_{8}	% NaAlSi_{3}O_{8}	Image
Anorthite	90–100	10–0	
Bytownite	70–90	30–10	
Labradorite	50–70	50–30	
Andesine	30–50	70–50	
Oligoclase	10–30	90–70	
Albite	0–10	100–90	

The distinction between these minerals cannot easily be made in the field. The composition can be roughly determined by specific gravity, but accurate measurement requires chemical or optical tests. The composition in a crushed grain mount can be obtained by the Tsuboi method, which yields an accurate measurement of the minimum refractive index that in turn gives an accurate composition. In thin section, the composition can be determined by either the Michel Lévy or Carlsbad-albite methods. The former relies on accurate measure of minimum index of refraction, while the latter relies on measuring the extinction angle under a polarizing microscope. The extinction angle is an optical characteristic and varies with the albite fraction (%Ab).

=== Endmembers ===
- Anorthite was named by Gustav Rose in 1823 from Greek an- ('not') + orthós ('straight'), literally 'oblique', referring to its triclinic crystallization. Anorthite is a comparatively rare mineral but occurs in the basic plutonic rocks of some orogenic calc-alkaline suites.
- Albite is named from the Latin albus, in reference to its unusually pure white color. The name was first applied by Johan Gottlieb Gahn and Jöns Jacob Berzelius in 1815. It is a relatively common and important rock-making mineral associated with the more silica-rich rock types, in hydrothermal veins, with greenschist facies metamorphic rocks, and in pegmatite dikes, often as the variety cleavelandite and associated with rarer minerals like tourmaline and beryl.

=== Intermediate members ===
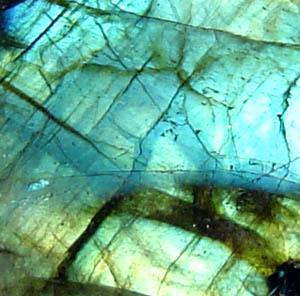
Labradorite displaying typical iridescent effect termed labradorescence (unknown scale)

The intermediate members of the plagioclase group are very similar to each other and normally cannot be distinguished except by their optical properties. The specific gravity in each member (albite 2.62) increases 0.02 per 10% increase in anorthite (2.75).

- Bytownite, named after the former name for Ottawa, Ontario, Canada—Bytown— is a rare mineral occasionally found in more basic rocks.
- Labradorite is the characteristic feldspar of the more basic rock types such as gabbro or basalt. Labradorite frequently shows an iridescent display of colors due to light refracting within the lamellae of the crystal. It is named after Labrador, where it is a constituent of the intrusive igneous rock anorthosite which is composed almost entirely of plagioclase. A variety of labradorite known as spectrolite is found in Finland.
- Andesine is a characteristic mineral of rocks such as diorite which contain a moderate amount of silica and related volcanics such as andesite.
- Oligoclase is common in granite and monzonite. The name oligoclase is derived from the Greek olígos ('small, slight') + klásis ('fracture'), in reference to the fact that its cleavage angle differs significantly from 90°. The term was first used by Breithaupt in 1826. Sunstone is mainly oligoclase (sometimes albite) with flakes of hematite.

== Petrogenesis ==
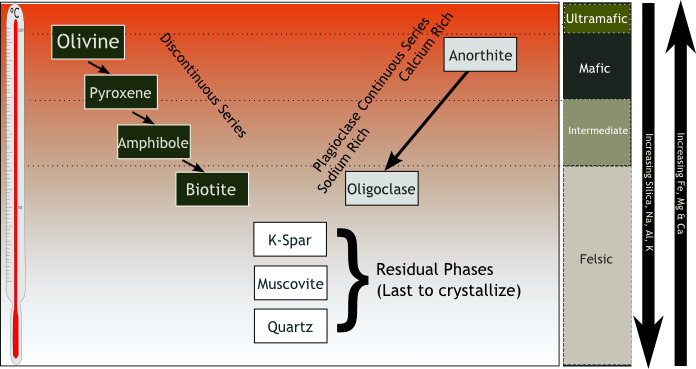
Bowen's reaction series

QAPF diagram for classification of plutonic rocks

Plagioclase is the primary aluminium-bearing mineral in mafic rocks formed at low pressure. It is normally the first and most abundant feldspar to crystallize from a cooling primitive magma. Anorthite has a much higher melting point than albite, and, as a result, calcium-rich plagioclase is the first to crystallize. The plagioclase becomes more enriched in sodium as the temperature drops, forming Bowen's continuous reaction series. However, the composition with which plagioclase crystallizes also depends on the other components of the melt, so it is not by itself a reliable thermometer.

The liquidus of plagioclase (the temperature at which the plagioclase first begins to crystallize) is about 1,215 °C (2,219 °F) for olivine basalt, with a composition of 50.5 wt% silica; 1,255 °C (2,291 °F) in andesite with a silica content of 60.7 wt%; and 1,275 °C (2,327 °F) in dacite with a silica content of 69.9 wt%. These values are for dry magma. The liquidus is greatly lowered by the addition of water, and much more for plagioclase than for mafic minerals. The eutectic (minimum melting mixture) for a mixture of anorthite and diopside shifts from 40 wt% anorthite to 78 wt% anorthite as the water vapor pressure goes from 1 bar to 10 kbar. The presence of water also shifts the composition of the crystallizing plagioclase towards anorthite. The eutectic for this wet mixture drops to about 1,010 °C (1,850 °F).

Crystallizing plagioclase is always richer in anorthite than the melt from which it crystallizes. This plagioclase effect causes the residual melt to be enriched in sodium and silicon and depleted in aluminium and calcium. However, the simultaneous crystallization of mafic minerals not containing aluminium can partially offset the depletion in aluminium. In volcanic rock, the crystallized plagioclase incorporates most of the potassium in the melt as a trace element.

New plagioclase crystals nucleate only with difficulty, and diffusion is very slow within the solid crystals. As a result, as a magma cools, increasingly sodium-rich plagioclase is usually crystallized onto the rims of existing plagioclase crystals, which retain their more calcium-rich cores. This results in compositional zoning of plagioclase in igneous rocks. In rare cases, plagioclase shows reverse zoning, with a more calcium-rich rim on a more sodium-rich core. Plagioclase also sometimes shows oscillatory zoning, with the zones fluctuating between sodium-rich and calcium-rich compositions, though this is usually superimposed on an overall normal zoning trend.

=== Classification of igneous rocks ===
Plagioclase is very important for the classification of crystalline igneous rocks. Generally, the more silica is present in the rock, the fewer the mafic minerals, and the more sodium-rich the plagioclase. Alkali feldspar appears as the silica content becomes high. Under the QAPF classification, plagioclase is one of the three key minerals, along with quartz and alkali feldspar, used to make the initial classification of the rock type. Low-silica igneous rocks are further divided into dioritic rocks having sodium-rich plagioclase (An<50) and gabbroic rocks having calcium-rich plagioclase (An>50). Anorthosite is an intrusive rock composed of at least 90% plagioclase.

Albite is an end member of both the alkali and plagioclase series. However, it is included in the alkali feldspar fraction of the rock in the QAPF classification.

=== In metamorphic rocks ===
Plagioclase is also common in metamorphic rock. Plagioclase tends to be albite in low-grade metamorphic rock, while oligoclase to andesine are more common in medium- to high-grade metamorphic rock. Metacarbonate rock sometimes contains fairly pure anorthite.

=== In sedimentary rocks ===
Feldspar makes up between 10 and 20 percent of the framework grains in typical sandstones. Alkali feldspar is usually more abundant than plagioclase in sandstone because Alkali feldspars are more resistant to chemical weathering and more stable, but sandstone derived from volcanic rock contains more plagioclase. Plagioclase weathers relatively rapidly to clay minerals such as smectite.

=== At the Mohorovičić discontinuity ===
The Mohorovičić discontinuity, which defines the boundary between the Earth's crust and the upper mantle, is thought to be the depth where feldspar disappears from the rock. While plagioclase is the most important aluminium-bearing mineral in the crust, it breaks down at the high pressure of the upper mantle, with the aluminium tending to be incorporated into clinopyroxene as Tschermak's molecule (CaAl_{2}SiO_{6}) or in jadeite NaAlSi_{2}O_{6}. At still higher pressure, the aluminium is incorporated into garnet.

=== Exsolution ===
At very high temperatures, plagioclase forms a solid solution with potassium feldspar, but this becomes highly unstable on cooling. The plagioclase separates from the potassium feldspar, a process called exsolution. The resulting rock, in which fine streaks of plagioclase (lamellae) are present in potassium feldspar, is called perthite.

The solid solution between anorthite and albite remains stable to lower temperatures, but ultimately becomes unstable as the rock approaches ambient surface temperatures. The resulting exsolution results in very fine lamellar and other intergrowths, normally detected only by sophisticated means. However, exsolution in the andesine to labradorite compositional range sometimes produces lamellae with thicknesses comparable to the wavelength of visible light. This acts like a diffraction grating, causing the labradorite to show the beautiful play of colors known as chatoyance.

== Uses ==
In addition to its importance to geologists in classifying igneous rocks, plagioclase finds practical use as construction aggregate, as dimension stone, and in powdered form as a filler in paint, plastics, and rubber. Sodium-rich plagioclase finds use in the manufacture of glass and ceramics.

Anorthosite could someday be important as a source of aluminium.

== See also ==
- Hypersolvus
- List of minerals
- Planetary differentiation
- Subsolvus
