= Woolamai Granite =

Geologic formation in Australia

- Stratigraphic range: Mid to Late Devonian, ~393–359 Ma
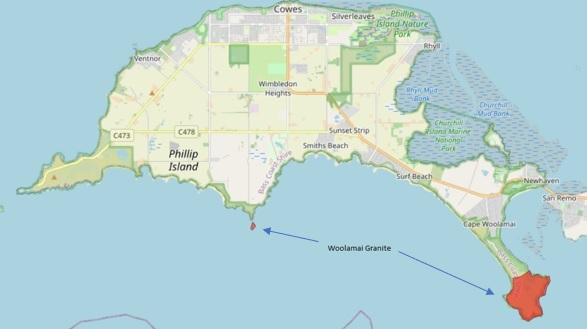
- A map of the distribution of Woolamai Granite on Phillip Island
- Type: Geological formation
- Unit of: Dromana Suite

Lithology
- Primary: Granite
- Other: Quartz, Perthite, Oligoclase, Apatite, Zircon, Aplite, Pegmatite

Location
- Coordinates: 38.5625°S 145.3533°E
- Region: Phillip Island of Victoria
- Country: Australia

Woolamai Granite is a Devonian age rock formation found on Phillip Island, Victoria, Australia. The granite outcrops at the south-eastern corner of Phillips Island at Cape Woolamai and at Pyramid rock, midway along the southern coast.

== Description ==
The rock formation is described as biotite granite: pink coarse-grained leucocratic; contains quartz, perthite, oligoclase, biotite and accessory apatite and zircon; veins of aplite and pegmatite present locally.

== History of Investigation ==
Granite was first recorded at Cape Woolamai on Phillip Island by Louis Freycinet in 1802 as part of the Baudin expedition to Australia.

In 1855 the explorer William Blandowski during his survey of Phillip Island noted that:

The granite of Cape Woolamai is quite peculiar to that locality, and forms picturesque pyramidal peaks... This fine-grained granite is characteristic, on account of the intense green colour of the mica, and the livid flesh colour of the felspar.

Woolamai Granite was subsequently described in 1929 as a granite mass with cream-coloured acid veins and vughs of large pink feldspar crystals, which impacts the evenness of the grain. It was also noted that the granite has a pleasant colour varying between light and dark pink, according to the amount of feldspar present. In 1942, the heavy minerals in the formation were analysed and were found to be the most acid of all Victorian granites

== Stratigraphy ==
At Cape Woolamai (a tombolo system), Woolamai Granite has been described as a stock-like body, covering an area of about 10 square kilometres (4 square miles), with the stock being originally part of the Bass horst. At the northern end, the granite is overlain by thin beds of Tertiary gravels (originally derived from the granite), Tertiary basalts and recent dunes. The granite is well exposed in coastal cliffs and on the south-western coast forming spectacular cliffs. Jointing has determined the direction of gutters and clefts that have been eroded in the cliff face, and has produced the pyramidal rock stacks and large boulders that are typical of the exposed southern coastlines.

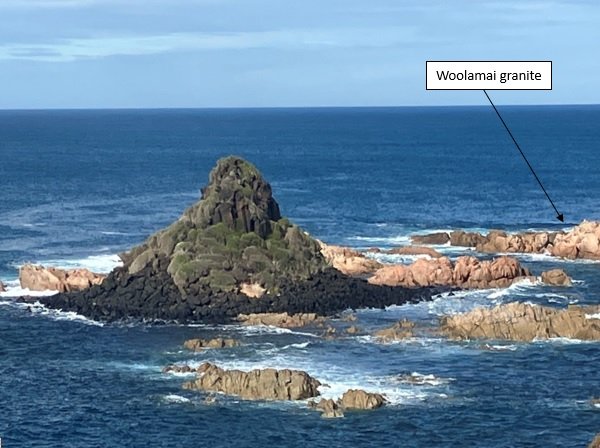
Woolamai granite outcrop at Pyramid Rock

Woolamai Granite makes up the basement of Pyramid rock, which consists of residual basalt, and is the largest outcrop outside of Cape Woolamai. Pyramid rock is an important example of the contact between volcanics and the pre-volcanic land surface and is one of the few locations on Phillip Island where the lava flows are absent or very thin and represents a high point on the pre-volcanic land surface.

== Economic Resources ==
A granite quarry located at Cape Woolamai, has provided Woolamai Granite for buildings. This included the base-courses and portico for the Colonial Mutual Building, built in 1893, in Melbourne. It was noted that vertical cracks developed across some of the blocks from "drys" in the granite and that some blocks were marred by quartz veins.
