= Subsolvus =

Two feldspar granite

In subsolvus or two feldspar granites crystallisation occurs at high water pressures resulting in the formation of two types of feldspar as opposed to hypersolvus granites in which crystallization at relatively low water pressures results in the formation of a single feldspar variety. Quoting Tuttle and Bowen in 1958 (abstract, page 3): ″A classification of salic rocks based on the nature of the alkali feldspar is proposed. The classification has two major divisions: (1) subsolidus, and (2) hypersolvus, depending on the whereabouts of the soda feldspar. In the hypersolvus rocks all the soda feldspar is or was in solid solution in the potash feldspar whereas in the subsolvus rocks the plagioclase is present as discrete grains. The two major divisions are further subdivided according to the nature of the alkali feldspar modification.″ Note that here the word "subsolidus" unfortunately looks like a misprint and probably has to be replaced by "subsolvus".

The two types of feldspar are usually:

- plagioclase: a member of the anorthite-albite series (CaAl_{2}Si_{2}O_{8}-NaAlSi_{3}O_{8})
- alkali feldspar: a member of the orthoclase-albite series (KAlSi_{3}O_{8}-NaAlSi_{3}O_{8}).

In fact ternary feldspars (comprising albite+orthoclase+anorthite) are believed to have been present in the high temperature state of the rock before cooling. Because Na and K are extremely mobile by solid-state diffusion, cooling gives rise to multiple forms of unmixing products, e.g. various kinds of perthite. "Due to slow reaction kinetics, feldspars usually do not attain equilibrium states and thus their thermodynamic behaviour is not yet fully understood."
