= Tin Mountain pegmatite =

- Stratigraphic range: Late Paleoproterozoic, ~1.7 Ga
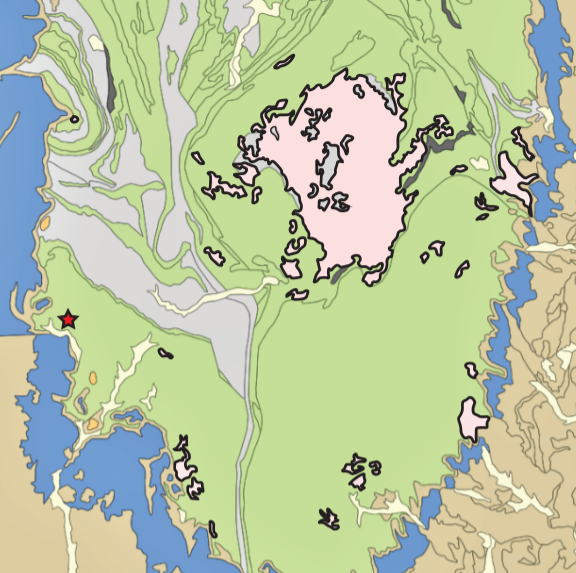
- Geological map showing the Tin Mountain pegmatite (star) and the associated Harney Peak Granite system (outlined pink).
- Type: Geological formation

Lithology
- Primary: Pegmatite

Location
- Region: Black Hills of South Dakota
- Country: United States
- Extent: South Dakota

The Tin Mountain pegmatite is an igneous intrusion located in the southern Black Hills, South Dakota. It is a part of the Harney Peak Granite dome that formed in the Late Paleoproterozoic around 1.7 billion years ago. The Harney Peak Granite system includes thousands of pegmatites, one of which is the Tin Mountain. The Tin Mountain pegmatite is rich in lithium, but was first mined in search of tin, which gave the mountain its name.

== Formation History ==
The geologic age and composition of the Black Hills stretches from Late Archean metagranites to both metavolcanic and metasedimentary rocks from the early Proterozoic, as well as the Proterozoic Harney Peak Granite. The Laramide Orogeny (70-80 Ma) formed the preexisting strata into the elongate dome of the Black Hills without causing major deformation to the rocks. The Tin Mountain pegmatite, an offshoot of the Harney Peak Granite, intrudes into both the Mayo Formation, an early Proterozoic quartz-mica schist, as well as a small amphibolite unit.

== Crystallization History ==
Pegmatites are thought to form from mature granitic magma systems and their extensive crystal-melt fractionation, which causes incompatible elements to accumulate in the residual melt. The Tin Mountain pegmatite can be genetically traced to the Harney Peak Granite dome through analyzing trace and rare earth element levels, such as samarium and neodymium, for which the concentrations in both the Harney Peak Granite pegmatite and the Tin Mountain are identical.

Trace element concentrations also supply information about the order of crystallization in the Tin Mountain pegmatite zones. Vertical zoning in pegmatites is not uncommon, especially when lithium concentrations are high, and the vertical zoning in the Tin Mountain pegmatite aligns with certain trace elements, thought to mimic the crystallization behavior of the major alkali groups.

== Structure ==
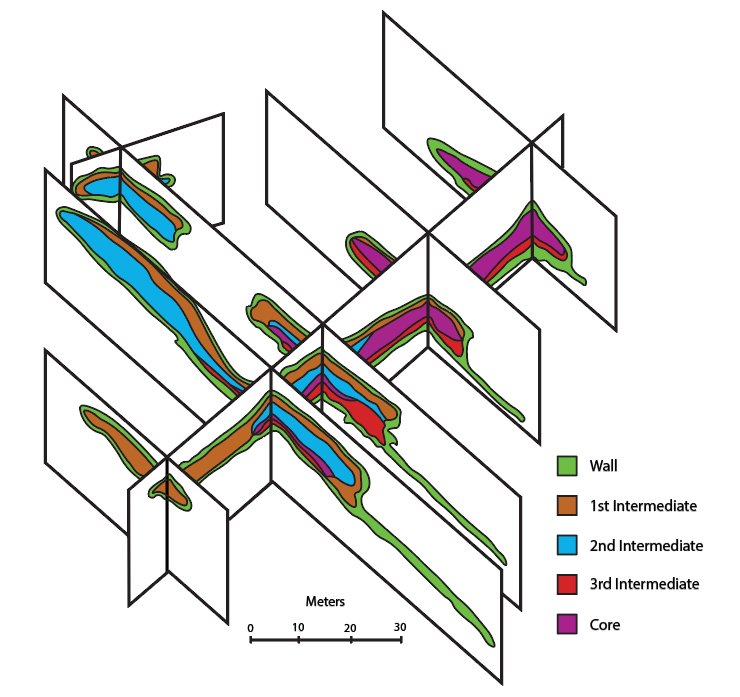
A fence diagram of the Tin Mountain pegmatite, adapted from Walker (1986 a).

The Tin Mountain pegmatite is roughly L-shaped, with the longer leg trending N7’W and the other trending N75’W. It is approximately 200 m long and is 30 m wide at the maximum. It is a vertically differentiated zoned pegmatite, and consists of five main zones: the wall zone, three intermediate zones, and a core.

=== Wall Zone ===
The wall zone encloses the pegmatite entirely as a shell, and crystallized first out of all the zones. It consists mainly of equigranular quartz, albite, and muscovite, and has a range of thickness from several meters to tens of centimeters.

=== First Intermediate Zone ===
The first intermediate zone is located mostly in the upper leg, above the other zones, and consists mainly of quartz, albite, perthite, and some muscovite.

=== Second Intermediate Zone ===
The second intermediate zone is located mostly below the first zone, and above the core and the third zone. It consists almost entirely of large perthite crystals, some reaching 4 m in length, with quartz crystals up to a meter across. Albite and muscovite are also present, but in more minor phases.

=== Third Intermediate Zone ===
The third intermediate zone is located in the lower parts of the pegmatite, below the core and the other intermediate zones. It consists mainly of quartz, albite, mica, and spodumene.

=== Core ===
The core is located in the center of the pegmatite and extends primarily downward into the lower leg. It consists mainly of quartz, spodumene, and micas with some albite, beryl, and amblygonite in minor phases.
