= Conway granite =

Thorium-rich type of granite

Conway granite is a typically pink (or mesoperthitic) biotite granite. It is amphibole-free and of coarse particle size (with portions of the rock fine-grained or porphyritic).

Conway granite has a relatively high concentration of thorium, at about 56 (±6) ppm; this amount is not enough to make the granite dangerously radioactive, but it is sufficient to make the rock a low-grade (almost certainly not economic, at least in the early years) source of thorium for a thorium fuel cycle.

Geologist Edward Hitchcock named the granite in 1877 after the town of Conway, New Hampshire, which is near where it is mined. The Old Man of the Mountain, a famous geologic feature in New Hampshire, was made of Conway granite. (The rock formation collapsed in 2003.) Conway granite is found throughout the lower areas of the central White Mountains, such as Franconia Notch, Crawford Notch, the center of the Pemigewasset Wilderness, and the Saco River valley. Other exposures of the formation include the Belknap Mountains south of Lake Winnipesaukee.
