= Hypersolvus =

Type of granite, with a single feldspar

In hypersolvus granites, as used by Tuttle and Bowen in 1958, crystallization at relatively low water pressures results in the formation of a single feldspar as opposed to subsolvus granites in which two distinct types of feldspar are present.

The distinctive character of feldspar in hypersolvus granite is to present exsolution textures. That is because the high temperature feldspar was ternary (i.e. contained comparable parts of the Ca, Na, K components) and was later dissociated during the cooling phase into K-rich parts and Na-Ca-rich parts, within the initial crystal. The resulting texture is referred to as perthitic.
