= Granite =

Type of igneous rock

- Igneous rock
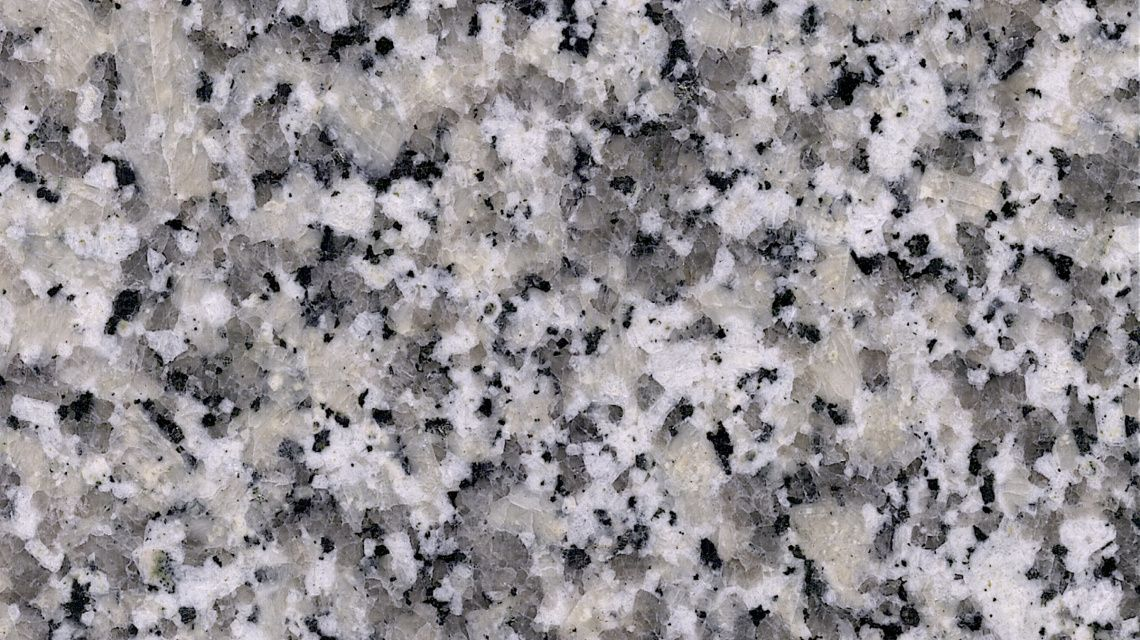
- Granite containing plagioclase feldspar, potassium feldspar, quartz, biotite, and/or amphibole

Composition
- Classification: Felsic
- Primary: potassium feldspar, plagioclase feldspar, and quartz
- Secondary: Differing amounts of muscovite, biotite, pyroxene, and calcic/sodic amphiboles
- Texture: Phaneritic
- Equivalents: Rhyolite (extrusive)

Granite (/ˈɡræn.ɪt/, GRAN-it or /ˈɡræn.aɪt/, GRAN-eye-t) is a coarse-grained (phaneritic) intrusive igneous rock composed mostly of quartz, alkali feldspar, mica and plagioclase. It forms from magma with a high content of silica and alkali metal oxides that slowly cools and solidifies underground. It is common in the continental crust of Earth, where it is found in igneous intrusions. These range in size from dikes only a few centimeters across to batholiths exposed over hundreds of square kilometers.

Granite is typical of a larger family of granitic rocks, or granitoids, that are composed mostly of coarse-grained quartz and feldspars in varying proportions. These rocks are classified by the relative percentages of quartz, alkali feldspar, and plagioclase (the QAPF classification), with true granite representing granitic rocks rich in quartz and alkali feldspar. Most granitic rocks also contain mica or amphibole minerals, though a few (known as leucogranites) contain almost no dark minerals.

Granite is nearly always massive (lacking any internal structures), and tough. These properties have made granite a widespread construction stone throughout human history.

== Description ==
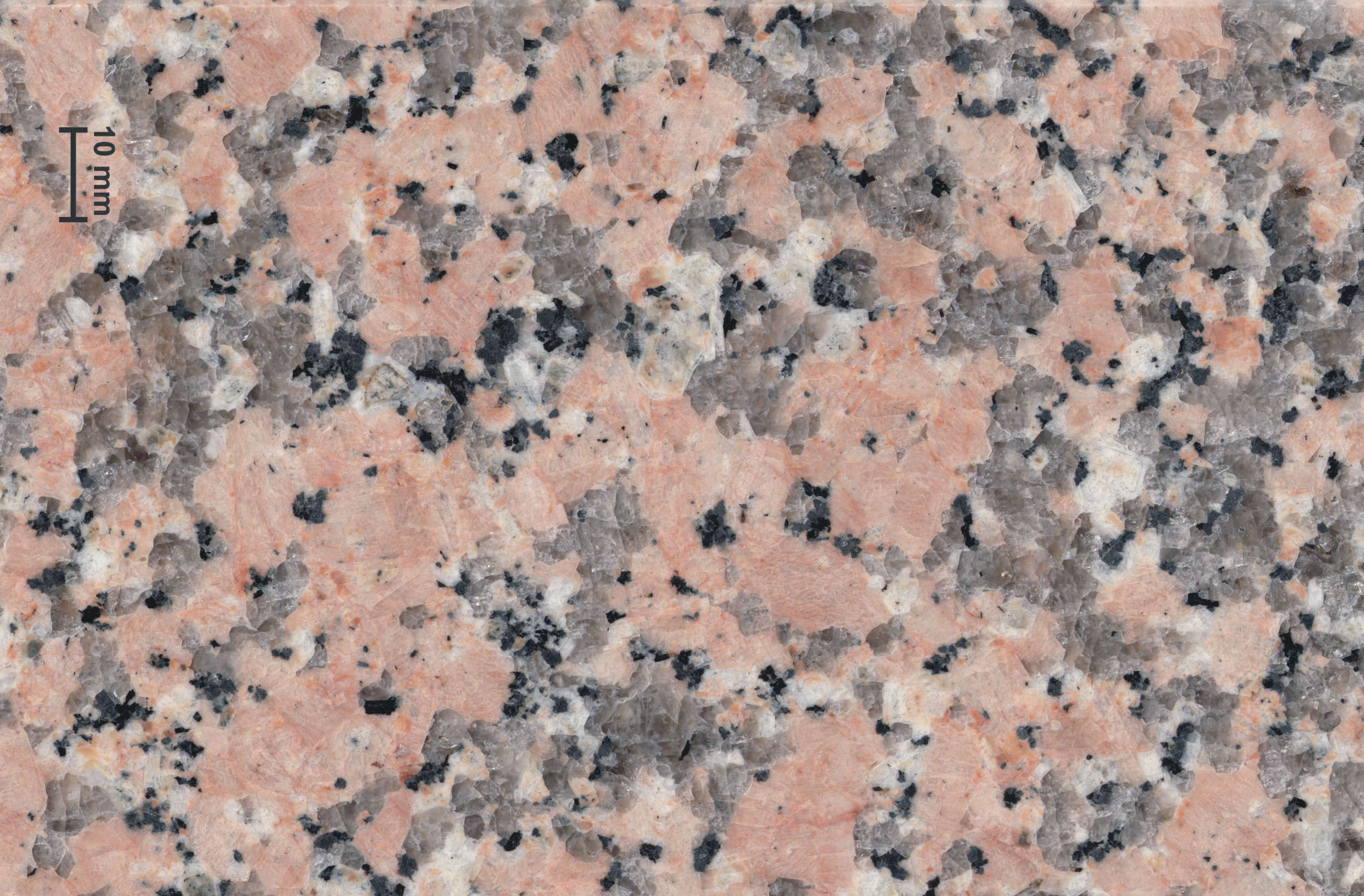
Granite with a moderate amount of plagioclase, alkali feldspar, and quartz

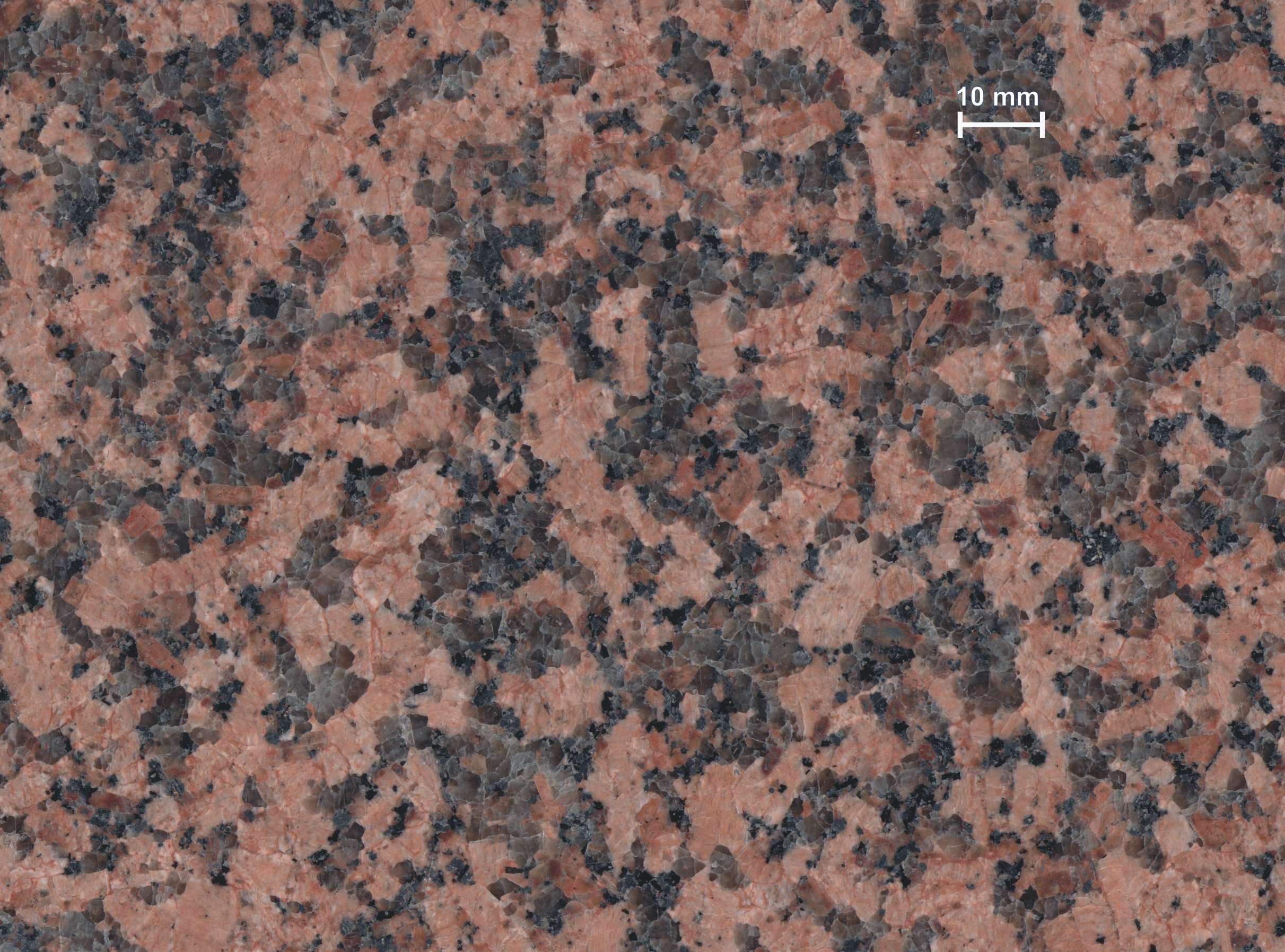
Granite with a composition of alkali feldspar and quartz

The word "granite" comes from the Latin granum, a grain, in reference to the coarse-grained structure of such a completely crystalline rock. Granites can be predominantly white, pink, or gray in color, depending on their mineralogy. Granitic rocks mainly consist of feldspar, quartz, mica, and amphibole minerals, which form an interlocking, somewhat equigranular matrix of feldspar and quartz with scattered darker biotite mica and amphibole (often hornblende) peppering the lighter color minerals. Occasionally some individual crystals (phenocrysts) are larger than the groundmass, in which case the texture is known as porphyritic. A granitic rock with a porphyritic texture is known as a granite porphyry. Granitoid is a general, descriptive field term for lighter-colored, coarse-grained igneous rocks. Petrographic examination is required for identification of specific types of granitoids. The alkali feldspar in granites is typically orthoclase or microcline and is often perthitic. The plagioclase is typically sodium-rich oligoclase. Phenocrysts are usually alkali feldspar.

Granitic rocks are classified according to the QAPF diagram for coarse grained plutonic rocks and are named according to the percentage of quartz, alkali feldspar (orthoclase, sanidine, or microcline) and plagioclase feldspar on the A-Q-P half of the diagram. True granite (according to modern petrologic convention) contains between 20% and 60% quartz by volume, with 35% to 90% of the total feldspar consisting of alkali feldspar. Granitic rocks poorer in quartz are classified as syenites or monzonites, while granitic rocks dominated by plagioclase are classified as granodiorites or tonalites. Granitic rocks with alkali feldspar comprising over 90% of the total feldspar are classified as alkali feldspar granites. Granitic rock with more than 60% quartz, which is uncommon, is classified simply as quartz-rich granitoid or, if composed almost entirely of quartz, as quartzolite.

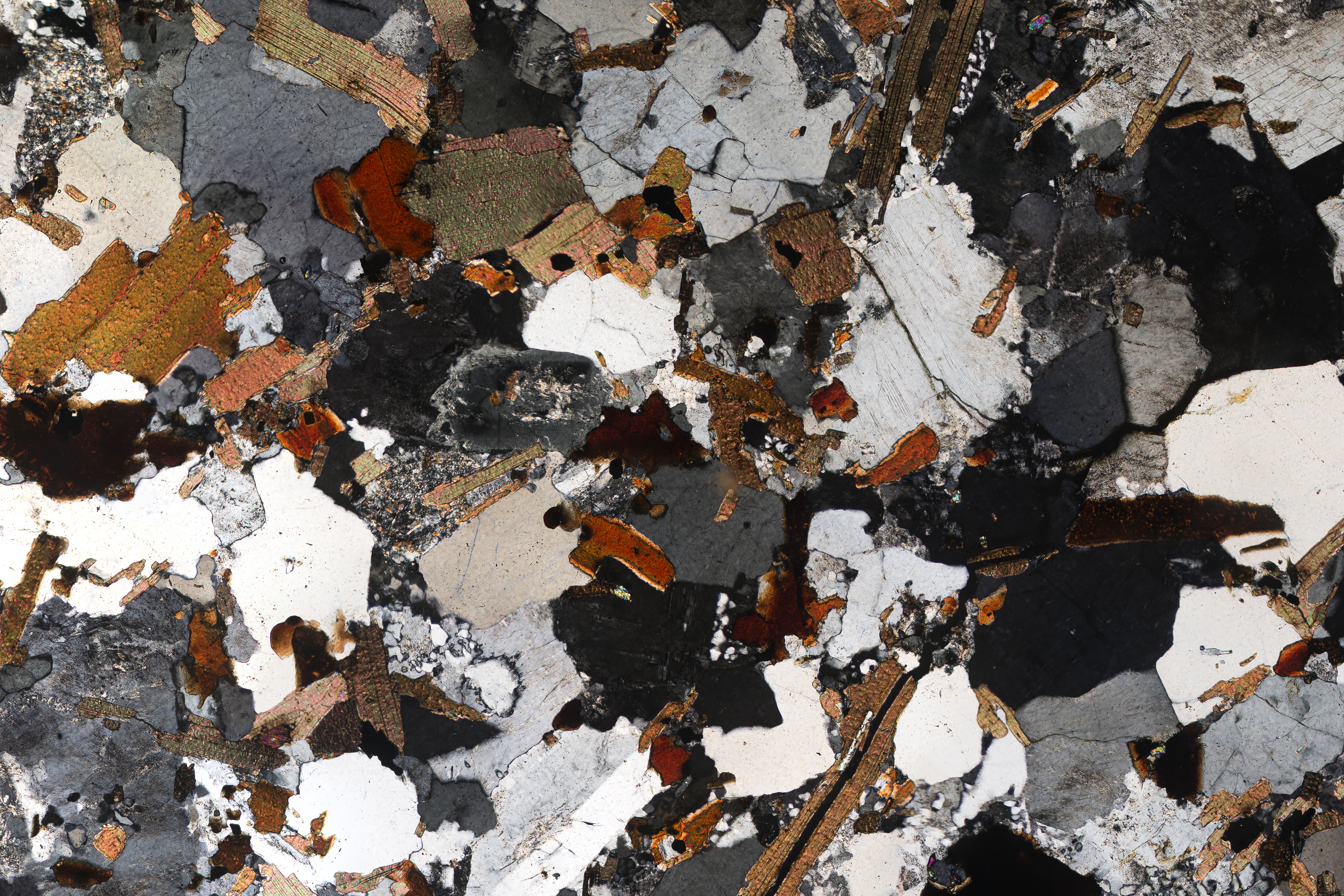
Granite in thin section, under cross-polarized light

True granites are further classified by the percentage of their total feldspar that is alkali feldspar. A granite containing 15% to 25% quartz and whose feldspar is 65% to 90% alkali feldspar is syenogranite, while the feldspar in monzogranite is 35% to 65% alkali feldspar. A granite containing both muscovite and biotite micas is called a binary or two-mica granite. Two-mica granites are typically high in potassium and low in plagioclase, and are usually S-type granites or A-type granites, as described below.

Another aspect of granite classification is the ratios of metals that potentially form feldspars. Most granites have a composition such that almost all their aluminum and alkali metals (sodium and potassium) are combined as feldspar. This is the case when K_{2}O + Na_{2}O + CaO > Al_{2}O_{3} > K_{2}O + Na_{2}O. Such granites are described as normal or metaluminous. Granites in which there is not enough aluminum to combine with all the alkali oxides as feldspar (Al_{2}O_{3} < K_{2}O + Na_{2}O) are described as peralkaline, and they contain unusual sodium amphiboles such as riebeckite. Granites in which there is an excess of aluminum beyond what can be taken up in feldspars (Al_{2}O_{3} > CaO + K_{2}O + Na_{2}O) are described as peraluminous, and they contain aluminum-rich minerals such as muscovite.

=== Physical properties ===
The average density of granite is between 2.65 and 2.75 g/cm^{3} (165 and 172 lb/cu ft), its compressive strength usually lies above 200 MPa (29,000 psi), and its viscosity near STP is 3–6·10^{20} Pa·s.

The melting temperature of dry granite at ambient pressure is 1215–1260 °C (2219–2300 °F); it is strongly reduced in the presence of water, down to 650 °C at a few hundred megapascals of pressure.

Granite has poor primary permeability overall, but strong secondary permeability through cracks and fractures if they are present.

=== Chemical composition ===
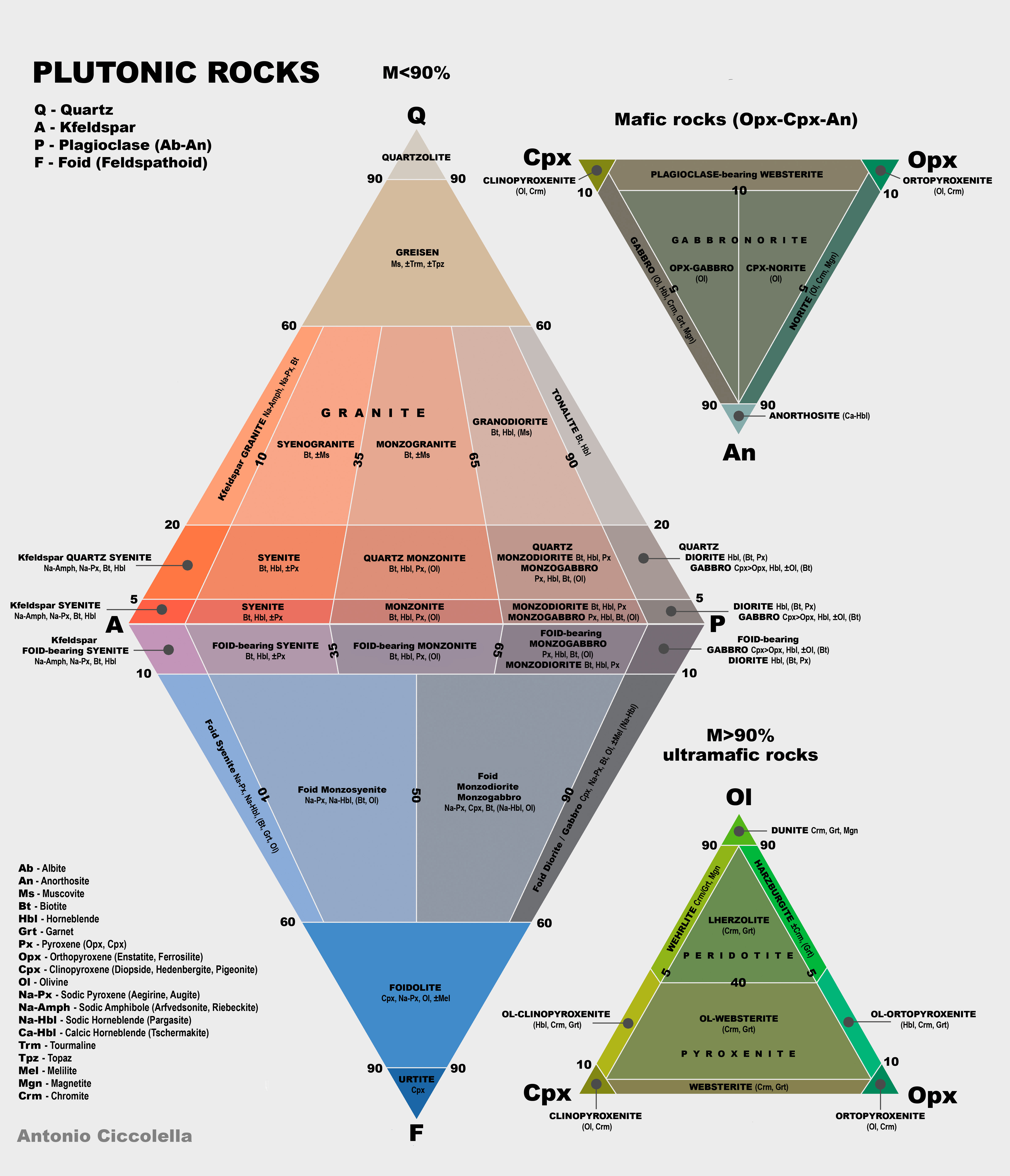
QAPF diagram with the granite field in pink

A worldwide average of the chemical composition of granite, by mass percent, based on 2485 analyses:

SiO_{2}	72.04% (silica)
Al_{2}O_{3}	14.42% (alumina)
K_{2}O	4.12%
Na_{2}O	3.69%
CaO	1.82%
FeO	1.68%
Fe_{2}O_{3}	1.22%
MgO	0.71%
TiO_{2}	0.30%
P_{2}O_{5}	0.12%
MnO	0.05%

The medium-grained equivalent of granite is microgranite. The extrusive igneous rock equivalent of granite is rhyolite.

== Occurrence ==
Granitic rock is widely distributed throughout the continental crust. Much of it was intruded during the Precambrian age; it is the most abundant basement rock that underlies the relatively thin sedimentary veneer of the continents. Outcrops of granite tend to form tors, domes or bornhardts, and rounded massifs. Granites sometimes occur in circular depressions surrounded by a range of hills, formed by the metamorphic aureole or hornfels. Granite often occurs as relatively small, less than 100 km^{2} stock masses (stocks) and in batholiths that are often associated with orogenic mountain ranges. Small dikes of granitic composition called aplites are often associated with the margins of granitic intrusions. In some locations, very coarse-grained pegmatite masses occur with granite.

== Origin ==
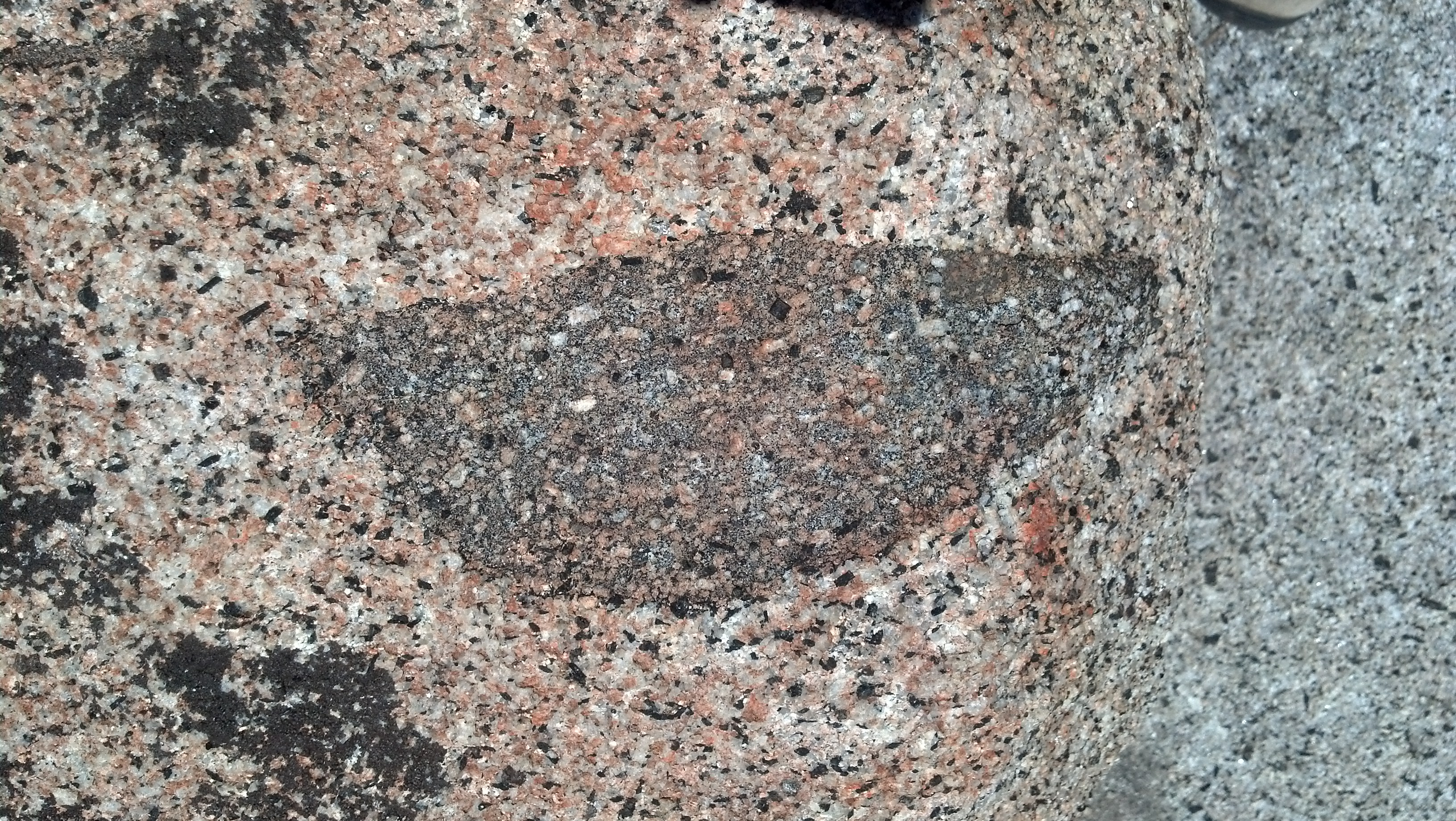
Mafic enclave in granite rock, at Yosemite National Park

Granite forms from silica-rich (felsic) magmas. Felsic magmas are thought to form by addition of heat or water vapor to rock of the lower crust, rather than by decompression of mantle rock, as is the case with basaltic magmas. It has also been suggested that some granites found at convergent boundaries between tectonic plates, where oceanic crust subducts below continental crust, were formed from sediments subducted with the oceanic plate. The melted sediments would have produced magma intermediate in its silica content, which became further enriched in silica as it rose through the overlying crust.

Early fractional crystallisation serves to reduce a melt in magnesium and chromium, and enrich the melt in iron, sodium, potassium, aluminum, and silicon. Further fractionation reduces the content of iron, calcium, and titanium. This is reflected in the high content of alkali feldspar and quartz in granite.

The presence of granitic rock in island arcs shows that fractional crystallization alone can convert a basaltic magma to a granitic magma, but the quantities produced are small. For example, granitic rock makes up just 4% of the exposures in the South Sandwich Islands. In continental arc settings, granitic rocks are the most common plutonic rocks, and batholiths composed of these rock types extend the entire length of the arc. There are no indication of magma chambers where basaltic magmas differentiate into granites, or of cumulates produced by mafic crystals settling out of the magma. Other processes must produce these great volumes of felsic magma. One such process is injection of basaltic magma into the lower crust, followed by differentiation, which leaves any cumulates in the mantle. Another is heating of the lower crust by underplating basaltic magma, which produces felsic magma directly from crustal rock. The two processes produce different kinds of granites, which may be reflected in the division between S-type (produced by underplating) and I-type (produced by injection and differentiation) granites, discussed below.

=== Alphabet classification system ===
Mineral assemblage of igneous rocks

The composition and origin of any magma that differentiates into granite leave certain petrological evidence as to what the granite's parental rock was. The final texture and composition of a granite are generally distinctive as to its parental rock. For instance, a granite that is derived from partial melting of metasedimentary rocks may have more alkali feldspar, whereas a granite derived from partial melting of metaigneous rocks may be richer in plagioclase. It is on this basis that the modern "alphabet" classification schemes are based.

The letter-based Chappell & White classification system was proposed initially to divide granites into I-type (igneous source) granite and S-type (sedimentary sources). Both types are produced by partial melting of crustal rocks, either metaigneous rocks or metasedimentary rocks.

I-type granites are characterized by a high content of sodium and calcium, and by a strontium isotope ratio, ^{87}Sr/^{86}Sr, of less than 0.708. ^{87}Sr is produced by radioactive decay of ^{87}Rb, and since rubidium is concentrated in the crust relative to the mantle, a low ratio suggests origin in the mantle. The elevated sodium and calcium favor crystallization of hornblende rather than biotite. I-type granites are known for their porphyry copper deposits. I-type granites are orogenic (associated with mountain building) and usually metaluminous.

S-type granites are sodium-poor and aluminum-rich. As a result, they contain micas such as biotite and muscovite instead of hornblende. Their strontium isotope ratio is typically greater than 0.708, suggesting a crustal origin. They also commonly contain xenoliths of metamorphosed sedimentary rock, and host tin ores. Their magmas are water-rich, and they readily solidify as the water outgasses from the magma at lower pressure, so they less commonly make it to the surface than magmas of I-type granites, which are thus more common as volcanic rock (rhyolite). They are also orogenic but range from metaluminous to strongly peraluminous.

Although both I- and S-type granites are orogenic, I-type granites are more common close to the convergent boundary than S-type. This is attributed to thicker crust further from the boundary, which results in more crustal melting.

A-type granites show a peculiar mineralogy and geochemistry, with particularly high silicon and potassium at the expense of calcium and magnesium and a high content of high field strength cations (cations with a small radius and high electrical charge, such as zirconium, niobium, tantalum, and rare earth elements.) They are not orogenic, forming instead over hot spots and continental rifting, and are metaluminous to mildly peralkaline and iron-rich. These granites are produced by partial melting of refractory lithology such as granulites in the lower continental crust at high thermal gradients. This leads to significant extraction of hydrous felsic melts from granulite-facies resitites. A-type granites occur in the Koettlitz Glacier Alkaline Province in the Royal Society Range, Antarctica. The rhyolites of the Yellowstone Caldera are examples of volcanic equivalents of A-type granite.

M-type granite was later proposed to cover those granites that were clearly sourced from crystallized mafic magmas, generally sourced from the mantle. Although the fractional crystallisation of basaltic melts can yield small amounts of granites, which are sometimes found in island arcs, such granites must occur together with large amounts of basaltic rocks.

H-type granites were suggested for hybrid granites, which were hypothesized to form by mixing between mafic and felsic from different sources, such as M-type and S-type. However, the big difference in rheology between mafic and felsic magmas makes this process problematic in nature.

=== Granitization ===
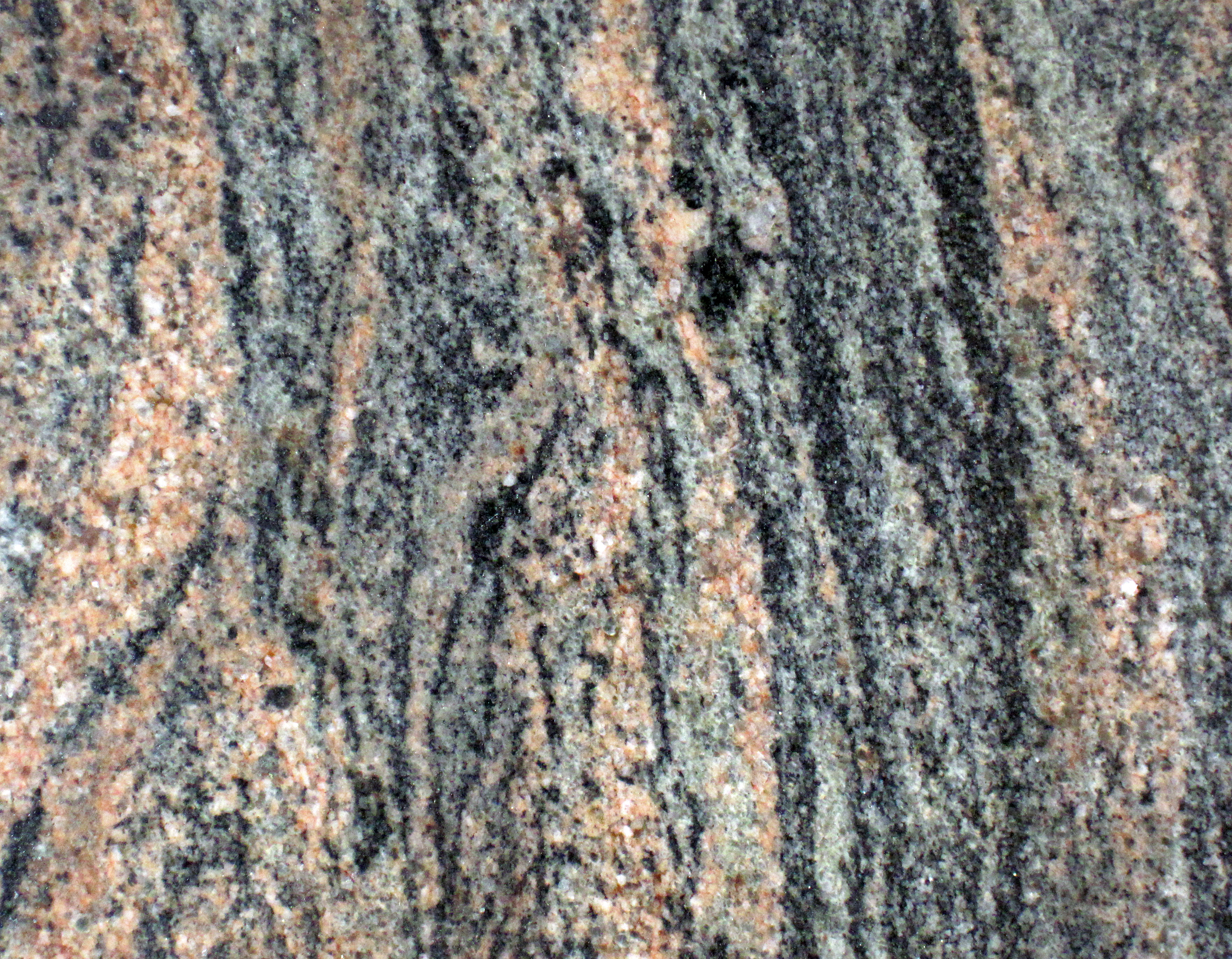
Migmatite featuring felsic minerals, at Morton Gneiss Complex

Granitization is an old, and largely discounted, hypothesis that granite is formed in place through extreme metasomatism. The idea behind granitization was that fluids would supposedly bring in elements such as potassium, and remove others, such as calcium, to transform a metamorphic rock into granite. This was supposed to occur across a migrating front. However, experimental work had established by the 1960s that granites were of igneous origin. The mineralogical and chemical features of granite can be explained only by crystal-liquid phase relations, showing that there must have been at least enough melting to mobilize the magma.

However, at sufficiently deep crustal levels, the distinction between metamorphism and crustal melting itself becomes vague. Conditions for crystallization of liquid magma are close enough to those of high-grade metamorphism that the rocks often bear a close resemblance. Under these conditions, granitic melts can be produced in place through the partial melting of metamorphic rocks by extracting melt-mobile elements such as potassium and silicon into the melts but leaving others such as calcium and iron in granulite residues. This may be the origin of migmatites. A migmatite consists of dark, refractory rock (the melanosome) that is permeated by sheets and channels of light granitic rock (the leucosome). The leucosome is interpreted as partial melt of a parent rock that has begun to separate from the remaining solid residue (the melanosome). If enough partial melt is produced, it will separate from the source rock, become more highly evolved through fractional crystallization during its ascent toward the surface, and become the magmatic parent of granitic rock. The residue of the source rock becomes a granulite.

The partial melting of solid rocks requires high temperatures and the addition of water or other volatiles which lower the solidus temperature (temperature at which partial melting commences) of these rocks. It was long debated whether crustal thickening in orogens (mountain belts along convergent boundaries) was sufficient to produce granite melts by radiogenic heating, but recent work suggests that this is not a viable mechanism. In-situ granitization requires heating by the asthenospheric mantle or by underplating with mantle-derived magmas.

== Ascent and emplacement ==
Granite magmas have a density of 2.4 Mg/m^{3}, much less than the 2.8 Mg/m^{3} of high-grade metamorphic rock. This gives them tremendous buoyancy, so that ascent of the magma is inevitable once enough magma has accumulated. However, the question of precisely how such large quantities of magma are able to shove aside country rock to make room for themselves (the room problem) is still a matter of research.

Two main mechanisms are thought to be important:

- Stokes diapir
- Fracture propagation

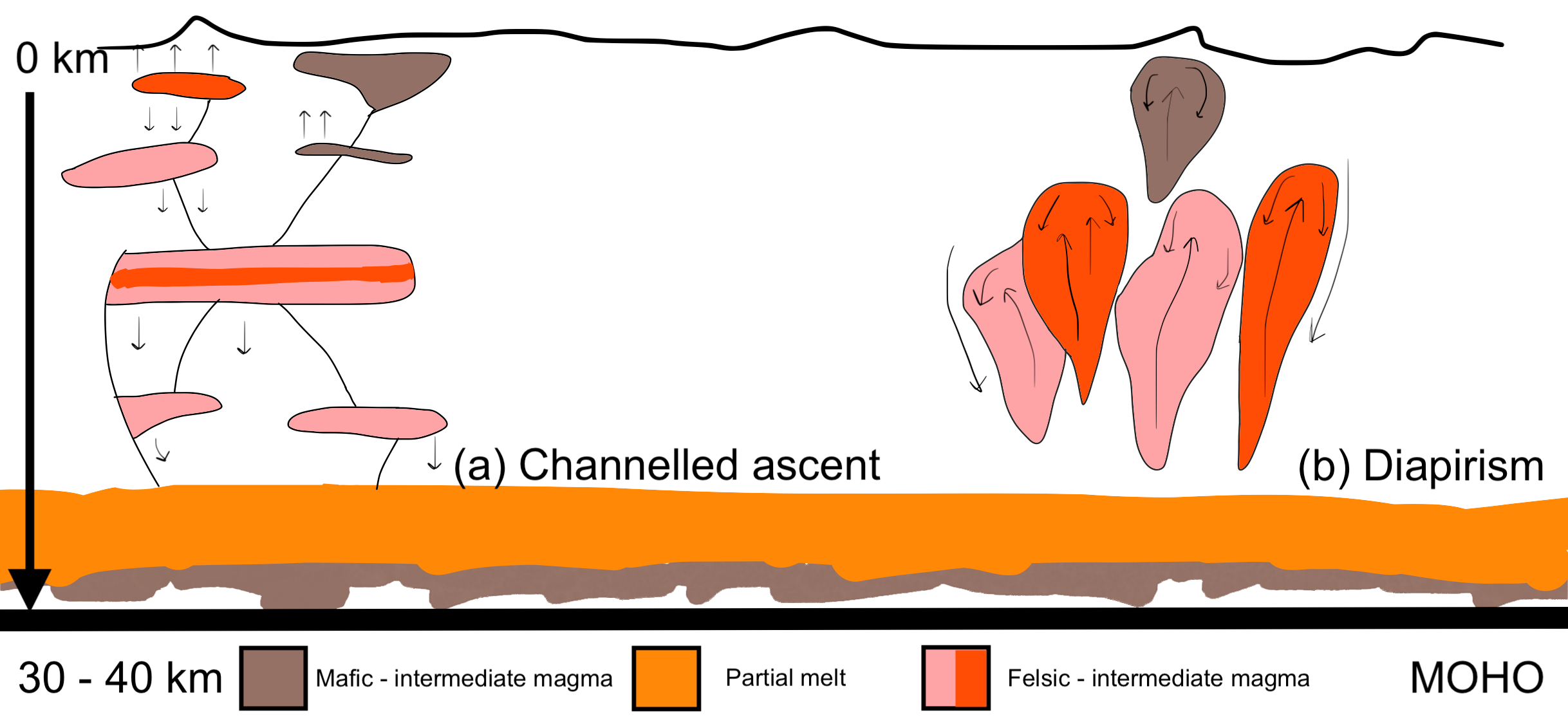
Schematic diagram illustrating the ascent and emplacement of magmas

Of these two mechanisms, Stokes diapirism has been favoured for many years in the absence of a reasonable alternative. The basic idea is that magma will rise through the crust as a single mass through buoyancy. As it rises, it heats the wall rocks, causing them to behave as a power-law fluid and thus flow around the intrusion allowing it to pass without major heat loss. This is entirely feasible in the warm, ductile lower crust where rocks are easily deformed, but runs into problems in the upper crust which is far colder and more brittle. Rocks there do not deform so easily: for magma to rise as a diapir it would expend far too much energy in heating wall rocks, thus cooling and solidifying before reaching higher levels within the crust.

Fracture propagation is the mechanism preferred by many geologists as it largely eliminates the major problems of moving a huge mass of magma through cold brittle crust. Magma rises instead in small channels along self-propagating dykes which form along new or pre-existing fracture or fault systems and networks of active shear zones. As these narrow conduits open, the first magma to enter solidifies and provides a form of insulation for later magma.

These mechanisms can operate in tandem. For example, diapirs may continue to rise through the brittle upper crust through stoping, where the granite cracks the roof rocks, removing blocks of the overlying crust which then sink to the bottom of the diapir while the magma rises to take their place. This can occur as piecemeal stopping (stoping of small blocks of chamber roof), as cauldron subsidence (collapse of large blocks of chamber roof), or as roof foundering (complete collapse of the roof of a shallow magma chamber accompanied by a caldera eruption.) There is evidence for cauldron subsidence at the Mt. Ascutney intrusion in eastern Vermont. Evidence for piecemeal stoping is found in intrusions that are rimmed with igneous breccia containing fragments of country rock.

Assimilation is another mechanism of ascent, where the granite melts its way up into the crust and removes overlying material in this way. This is limited by the amount of thermal energy available, which must be replenished by crystallization of higher-melting minerals in the magma. Thus, the magma is melting crustal rock at its roof while simultaneously crystallizing at its base. This results in steady contamination with crustal material as the magma rises. This may not be evident in the major and minor element chemistry, since the minerals most likely to crystallize at the base of the chamber are the same ones that would crystallize anyway, but crustal assimilation is detectable in isotope ratios. Heat loss to the country rock means that ascent by assimilation is limited to distance similar to the height of the magma chamber.

== Weathering ==
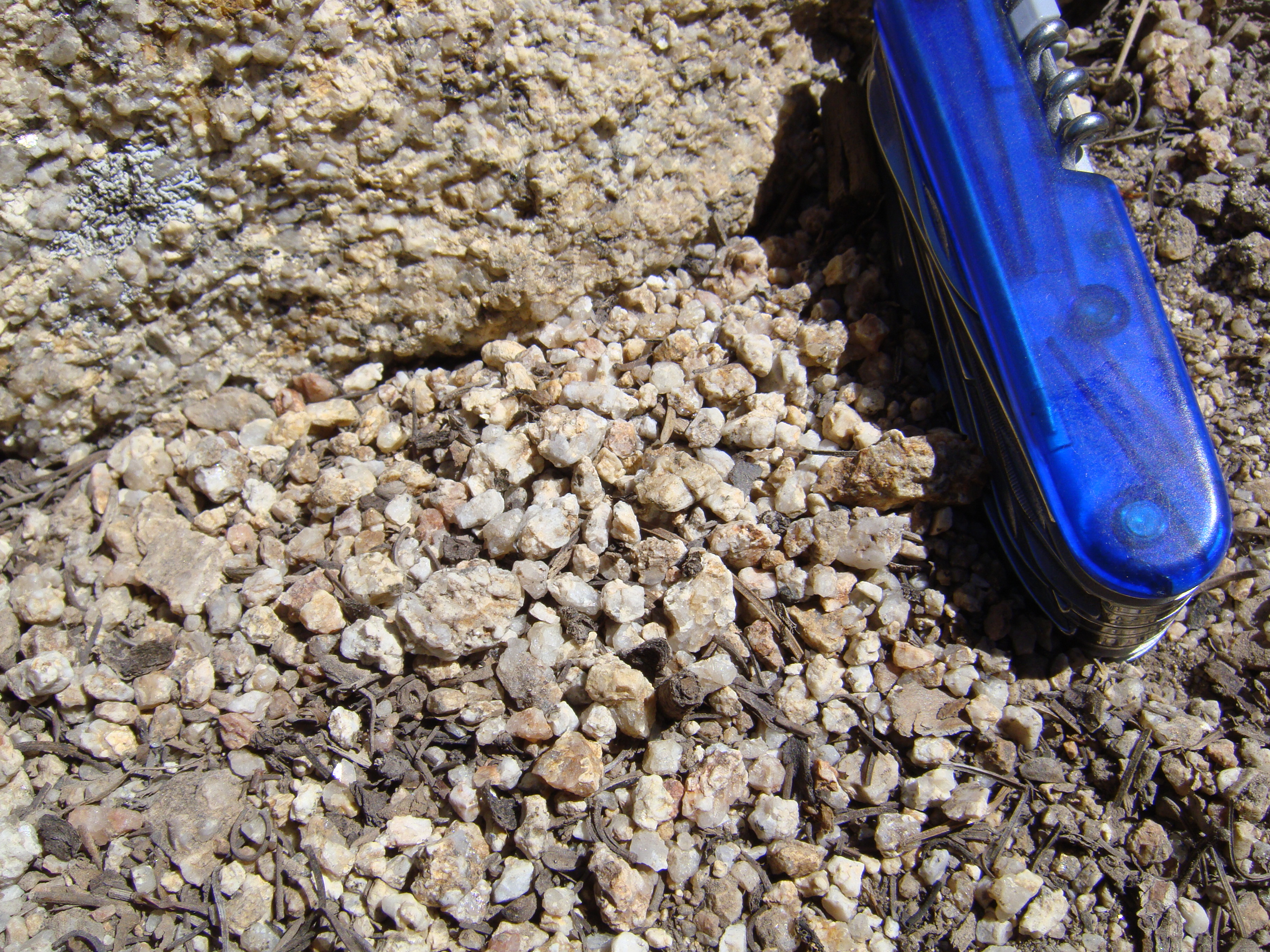
Grus sand and granitoid from which it derived

Physical weathering occurs on a large scale in the form of exfoliation joints, which are the result of granite's expanding and fracturing as pressure is relieved when overlying material is removed by erosion or other processes.

Chemical weathering of granite occurs when dilute carbonic acid, and other acids present in rain and soil waters, alter feldspar in a process called hydrolysis. As demonstrated in the following reaction, this causes potassium feldspar to form kaolinite, with potassium ions, bicarbonate, and silica in solution as byproducts. An end product of granite weathering is grus, which is often made up of coarse-grained fragments of disintegrated granite.

2 KAlSi_{3}O_{8} + 2 H_{2}CO_{3} + 9 H_{2}O → Al_{2}Si_{2}O_{5}(OH)_{4} + 4 H_{4}SiO_{4} + 2 K^{+} + 2 HCO_{3}^{−}

Climatic variations also influence the weathering rate of granites. For about two thousand years, the relief engravings on Cleopatra's Needle obelisk had survived the arid conditions of its origin before its transfer to London. Within two hundred years, the red granite has drastically deteriorated in the damp and polluted air there.

Soil development on granite reflects the rock's high quartz content and dearth of available bases, with the base-poor status predisposing the soil to acidification and podzolization in cool humid climates as the weather-resistant quartz yields much sand. Feldspars also weather slowly in cool climes, allowing sand to dominate the fine-earth fraction. In warm humid regions, the weathering of feldspar as described above is accelerated so as to allow a much higher proportion of clay with the Cecil soil series a prime example of the consequent Ultisol great soil group.

Fires can also contribute to the weathering of granite. The high temperatures reached during a fire—often exceeding 1000 °C—can cause significant physical and chemical processes that alter the rock. Among the physical processes, the differential thermal expansion of individual mineral grains, the anisotropic expansion of certain minerals, and polymorphic transformations, such as the alpha-beta quartz transition, induce substantial volume changes and generate internal stresses that damage the granite. Additionally, the decomposition of certain granite constituents, such as phyllosilicates, at specific temperatures further contributes to granite degradation. As a result, granite becomes micro-fractured, its total porosity increases, and its mechanical strength is significantly reduced.

== Natural radiation ==
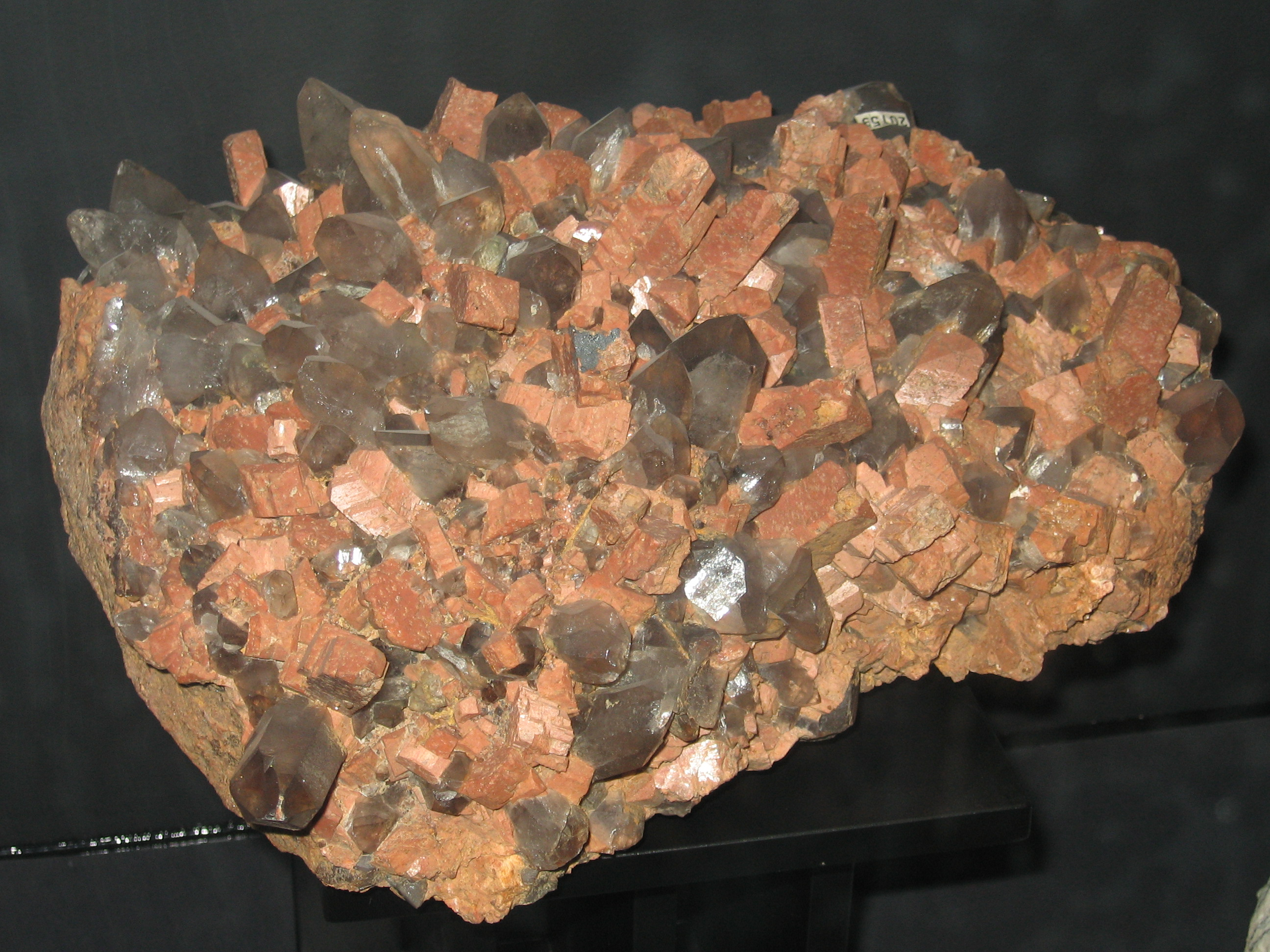
Pegmatitic granite composed of orthoclase and quartz

Granite is a natural source of radiation, like most natural stones. Potassium-40 is a radioactive isotope of weak emission, and a constituent of alkali feldspar, which in turn is a common component of granitic rocks, more abundant in alkali feldspar granite and syenites. Some granites contain around 10 to 20 parts per million (ppm) of uranium. By contrast, more mafic rocks, such as tonalite, gabbro and diorite, have 1 to 5 ppm uranium, and limestones and sedimentary rocks usually have equally low amounts.

Many large granite plutons are sources for palaeochannel-hosted or roll front uranium ore deposits, where the uranium washes into the sediments from the granite uplands and associated, often highly radioactive pegmatites.

Cellars and basements built into soils over granite can become a trap for radon gas, which is formed by the decay of uranium. Radon gas poses significant health concerns and is the number two cause of lung cancer in the US behind smoking.

Thorium occurs in all granites. Conway granite has been noted for its relatively high thorium concentration of 56±6 ppm.

There is some concern that some granite sold as countertops or building material may be hazardous to health. Dan Steck of St. Johns University has stated that approximately 5% of all granite is of concern, with the caveat that only a tiny percentage of the tens of thousands of granite slab types have been tested. Resources from national geological survey organizations are accessible online to assist in assessing the risk factors in granite country and design rules relating, in particular, to preventing accumulation of radon gas in enclosed basements and dwellings.

A study of granite countertops was done (initiated and paid for by the Marble Institute of America) in November 2008 by National Health and Engineering Inc. of USA. In this test, all of the 39 full-size granite slabs that were measured for the study showed radiation levels well below the European Union safety standards (section 4.1.1.1 of the National Health and Engineering study) and radon emission levels well below the average outdoor radon concentrations in the US.

== Industry and uses ==
Granite and related marble industries are considered one of the oldest industries in the world, existing as far back as Ancient Egypt. Major modern exporters of granite include China, India, Italy, Brazil, Canada, Germany, Sweden, Spain and the United States. The term "granite" is a vague term in the construction industry as it usually includes other intrusive rocks such as gabbro and diorite besides true granite.

=== Antiquity ===
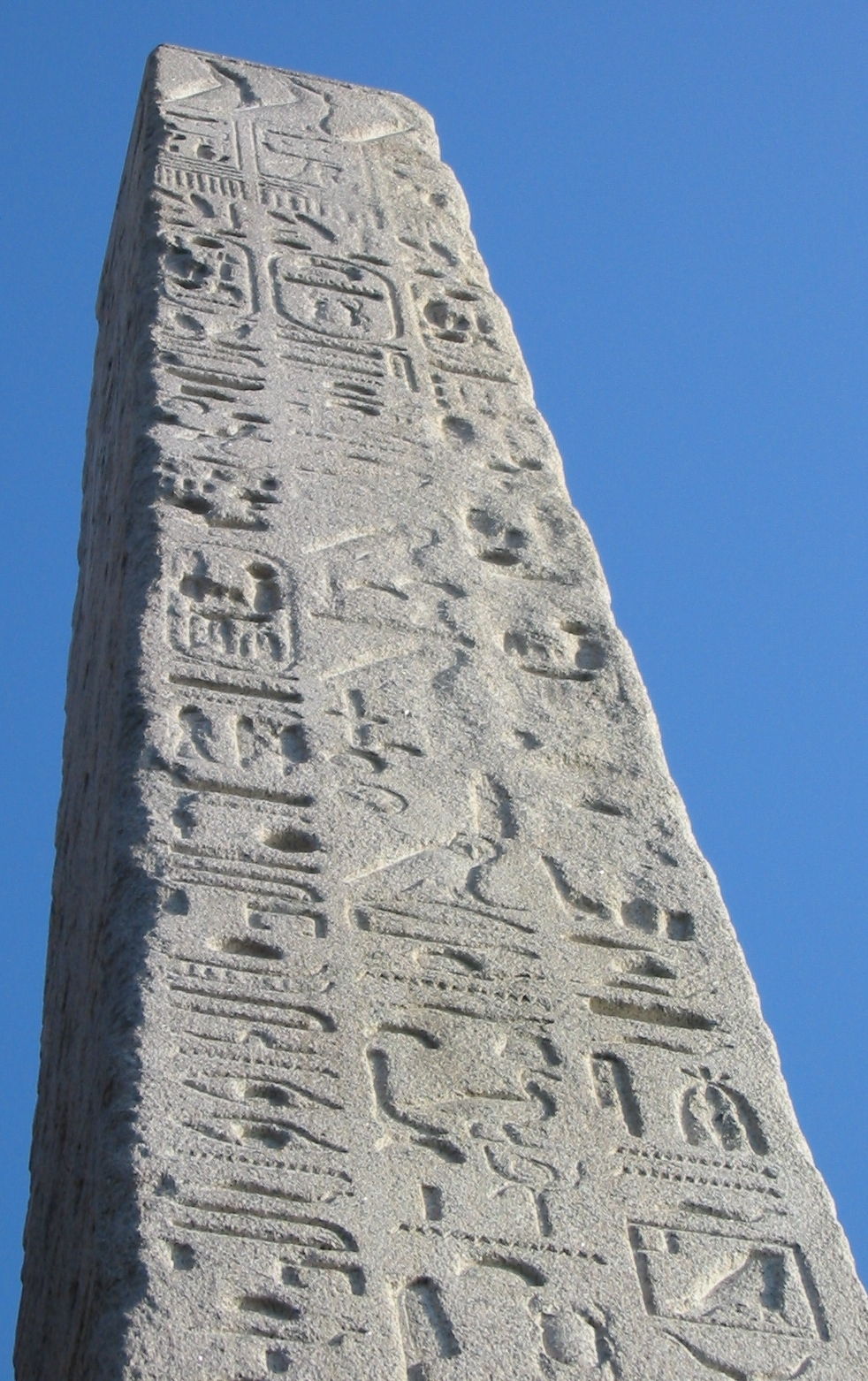
Cleopatra's Needle, London

The Red Pyramid of Egypt (c. 2590 BC), named for the light crimson hue of its exposed limestone surfaces, is the third largest of Egyptian pyramids. Pyramid of Menkaure, likely dating 2510 BC, was constructed of limestone and granite blocks. The Great Pyramid of Giza (c. 2580 BC) contains a granite sarcophagus fashioned of "Red Aswan Granite". The mostly ruined Black Pyramid dating from the reign of Amenemhat III once had a polished granite pyramidion or capstone, which is now on display in the main hall of the Egyptian Museum in Cairo (see Dahshur). Other uses in Ancient Egypt include columns, door lintels, sills, jambs, and wall and floor veneer. How the Egyptians worked the solid granite is still a matter of debate. Tool marks described by the Egyptologist Anna Serotta indicate the use of flint tools on finer work with harder stones, e.g. when producing the hieroglyphic inscriptions. Patrick Hunt has postulated that the Egyptians used emery, which has greater hardness.

The Seokguram Grotto in Korea is a Buddhist shrine and part of the Bulguksa temple complex. Completed in 774 AD, it is an artificial grotto constructed entirely of granite. The main Buddha of the grotto is a highly regarded piece of Buddhist art, and along with the temple complex to which it belongs, Seokguram was added to the UNESCO World Heritage List in 1995.

Rajaraja Chola I of the Chola Dynasty in South India built the world's first temple entirely of granite in the 11th century AD in Tanjore, India. The Brihadeeswarar Temple dedicated to Lord Shiva was built in 1010. The massive Gopuram (ornate, upper section of shrine) is believed to have a mass of around 81 tonnes. It was the tallest temple in south India.

Imperial Roman granite was quarried mainly in Egypt, and also in Turkey, and on the islands of Elba and Giglio. Granite became "an integral part of the Roman language of monumental architecture". The quarrying ceased around the third century AD. Beginning in Late Antiquity the granite was reused, which since at least the early 16th century became known as spolia. Through the process of case-hardening, granite becomes harder with age. The technology required to make tempered metal chisels was largely forgotten during the Middle Ages. As a result, Medieval stoneworkers were forced to use saws or emery to shorten ancient columns or hack them into discs. Giorgio Vasari noted in the 16th century that granite in quarries was "far softer and easier to work than after it has lain exposed" while ancient columns, because of their "hardness and solidity have nothing to fear from fire or sword, and time itself, that drives everything to ruin, not only has not destroyed them but has not even altered their colour."

=== Modern ===
==== Sculpture and memorials ====
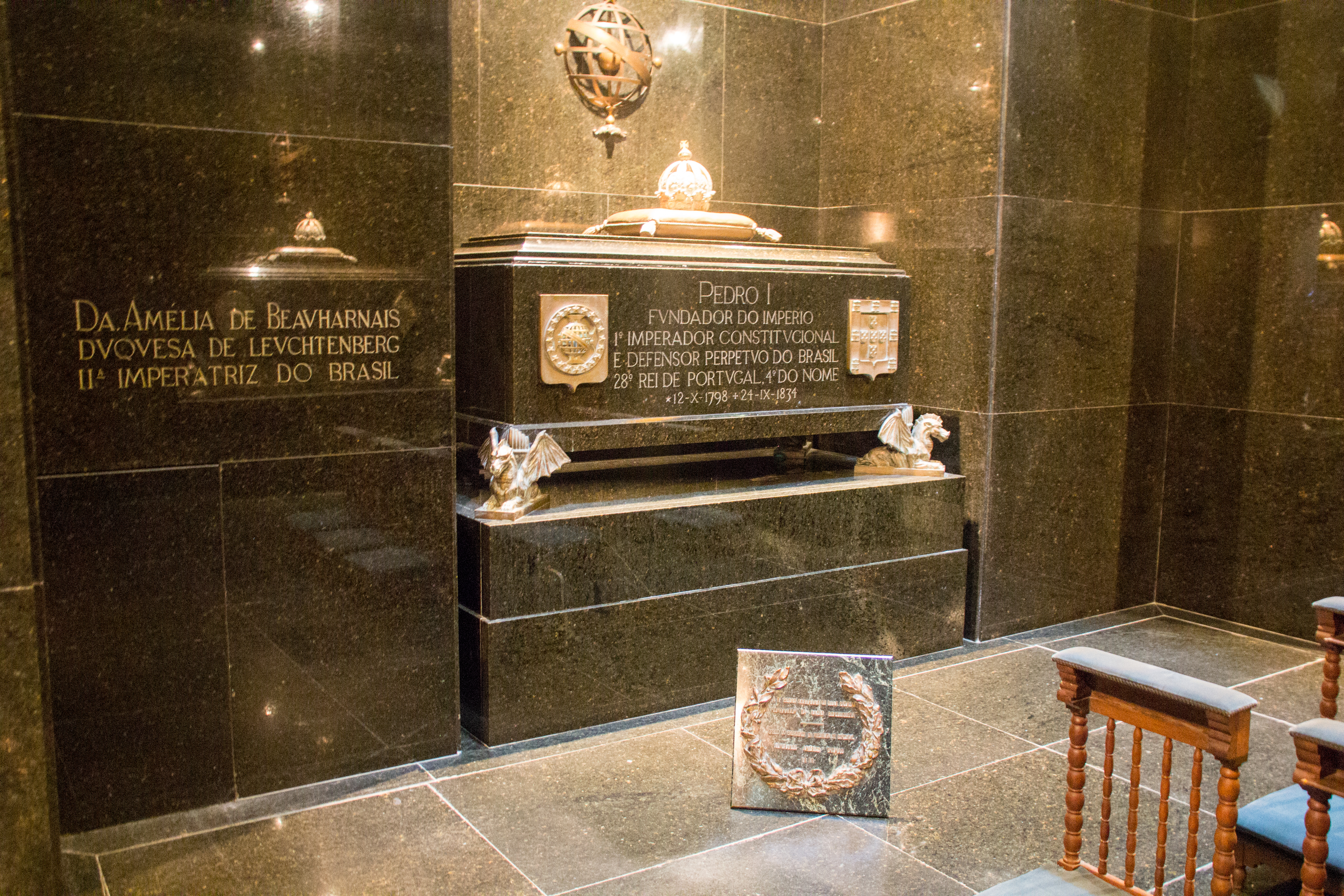
The grave of Emperor Pedro I of Brazil (who was also King of Portugal as Pedro IV) and those of his wives, Maria Leopoldina (not pictured, opposite his grave) and Amélie (left), are made of green granite. The walls as well as the floor are clad in the same material. The crypt is located beneath the Monument to the Independence of Brazil

In some areas, granite is used for gravestones and memorials. Granite is a hard stone and requires skill to carve by hand. Until the early 18th century, in the Western world, granite could be carved only by hand tools with generally poor results.

A key breakthrough was the invention of steam-powered cutting and dressing tools by Alexander MacDonald of Aberdeen, inspired by seeing ancient Egyptian granite carvings. In 1832, the first polished tombstone of Aberdeen granite to be erected in an English cemetery was installed at Kensal Green Cemetery. It caused a sensation in the London monumental trade and for some years all polished granite ordered came from MacDonald's. As a result of the work of sculptor William Leslie, and later Sidney Field, granite memorials became a major status symbol in Victorian Britain. The royal sarcophagus at Frogmore was probably the pinnacle of its work, and at 30 tons one of the largest. It was not until the 1880s that rival machinery and works could compete with the MacDonald works.

Modern methods of carving include using computer-controlled rotary bits and sandblasting over a rubber stencil. Leaving the letters, numbers, and emblems exposed and the remainder of the stone covered with rubber, the blaster can create virtually any kind of artwork or epitaph.

The stone known as "black granite" is usually gabbro, which has a completely different chemical composition.

==== Buildings ====
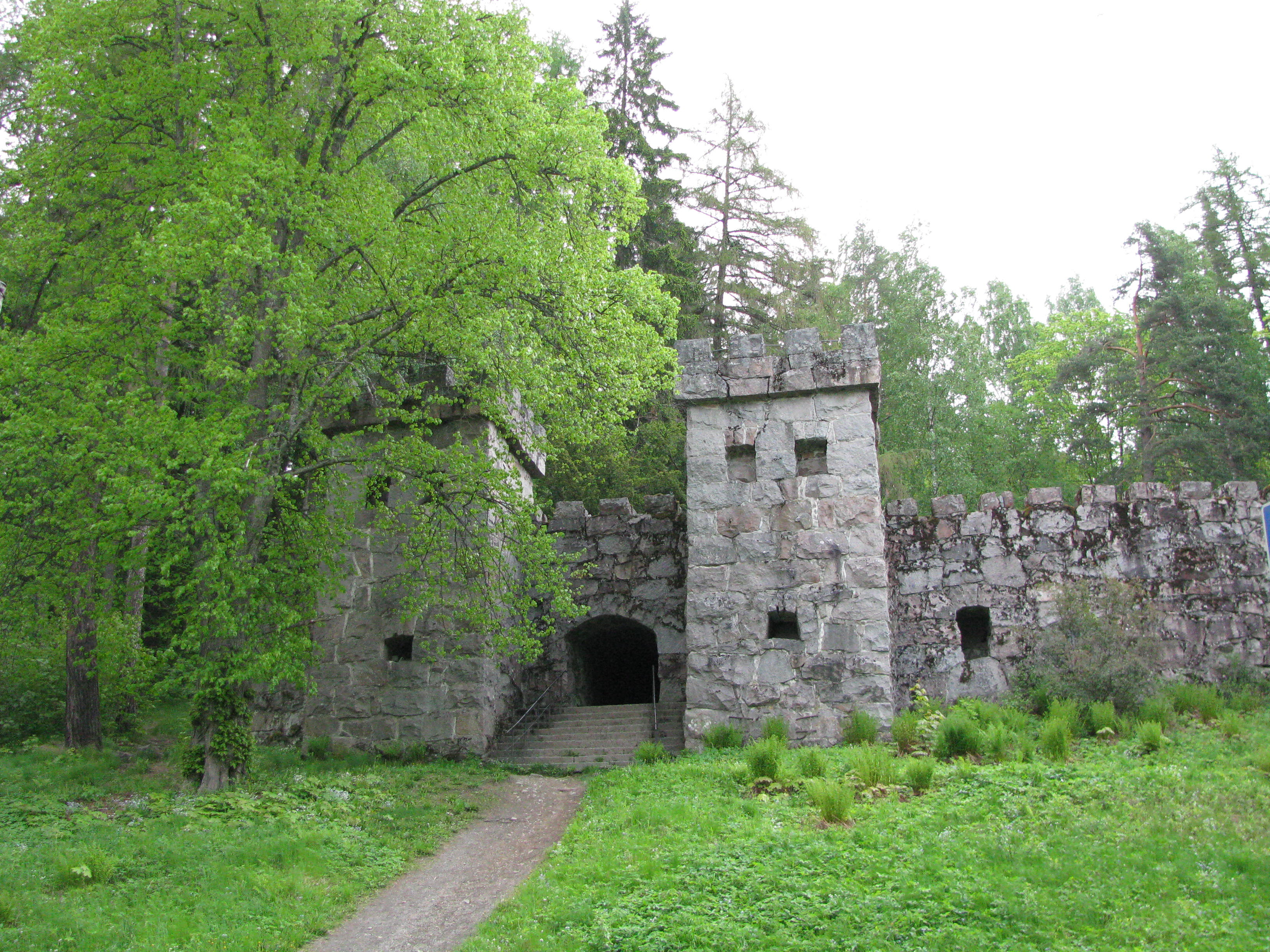
The granite castle of Aulanko in Hämeenlinna, Finland

Granite has been extensively used as a dimension stone and as flooring tiles in public and commercial buildings and monuments. Aberdeen in Scotland, which is constructed principally from local granite, is known as "The Granite City". Because of its abundance in New England, granite was commonly used to build foundations for homes there. The Granite Railway, America's first railroad, was built to haul granite from the quarries in Quincy, Massachusetts, to the Neponset River in the 1820s.

==== Engineering ====
Engineers have traditionally used polished granite surface plates to establish a plane of reference, since they are relatively impervious, inflexible, and maintain good dimensional stability. Sandblasted concrete with a heavy aggregate content has an appearance similar to rough granite, and is often used as a substitute when use of real granite is impractical. Granite tables are used extensively as bases or even as the entire structural body of optical instruments, CMMs, and very high precision CNC machines because of granite's rigidity, high dimensional stability, and excellent vibration characteristics. A most unusual use of granite was as the material of the tracks of the Haytor Granite Tramway, Devon, England, in 1820. Granite block is usually processed into slabs, which can be cut and shaped by a cutting center. In military engineering, Finland planted granite boulders along its Mannerheim Line to block invasion by Russian tanks in the Winter War of 1939–40.

==== Paving ====
Granite is used as a pavement material. This is because it is extremely durable, permeable and requires little maintenance. For example, in Sydney, Australia black granite stone is used for the paving and kerbs throughout the Central Business District. Granite can be crushed using industrial equipment such as VSI or cone crusher.

==== Curling stones ====
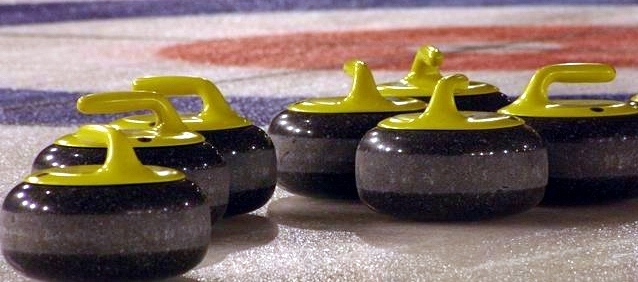
Curling stones

Curling stones are traditionally fashioned of Ailsa Craig granite. The first stones were made in the 1750s, the original source being Ailsa Craig in Scotland. Because of the rarity of this granite, the best stones can cost as much as US$1,500. Between 60 and 70 percent of the stones used today are made from Ailsa Craig granite. Although the island is now a wildlife reserve, it is still quarried under license for Ailsa granite by Kays of Scotland for curling stones.

=== Countertops ===
In the United States, granite is a popular choice for countertops due to its affordability, aesthetic appeal, and convenience. They are also sought after for their natural acid-resistance.

== Rock climbing ==
Granite is one of the rocks most prized by climbers, for its steepness, soundness, crack systems, and friction. Well-known venues for granite climbing include the Yosemite Valley, the Bugaboos, the Mont Blanc massif (and peaks such as the Aiguille du Dru, the Mourne Mountains, the Adamello-Presanella Alps, the Aiguille du Midi and the Grandes Jorasses), the Bregaglia, Corsica, parts of the Karakoram (especially the Trango Towers), the Fitzroy Massif and the Paine Massif in Patagonia, Baffin Island, Ogawayama, the Cornish coast, the Cairngorms, Sugarloaf Mountain in Rio de Janeiro, Brazil, and the Stawamus Chief, British Columbia, Canada.

In bouldering, the boulder problem recognized as the hardest in the world, the Burden of Dreams, is on a red granite boulder in Loviisa, Finland.

== Gallery ==
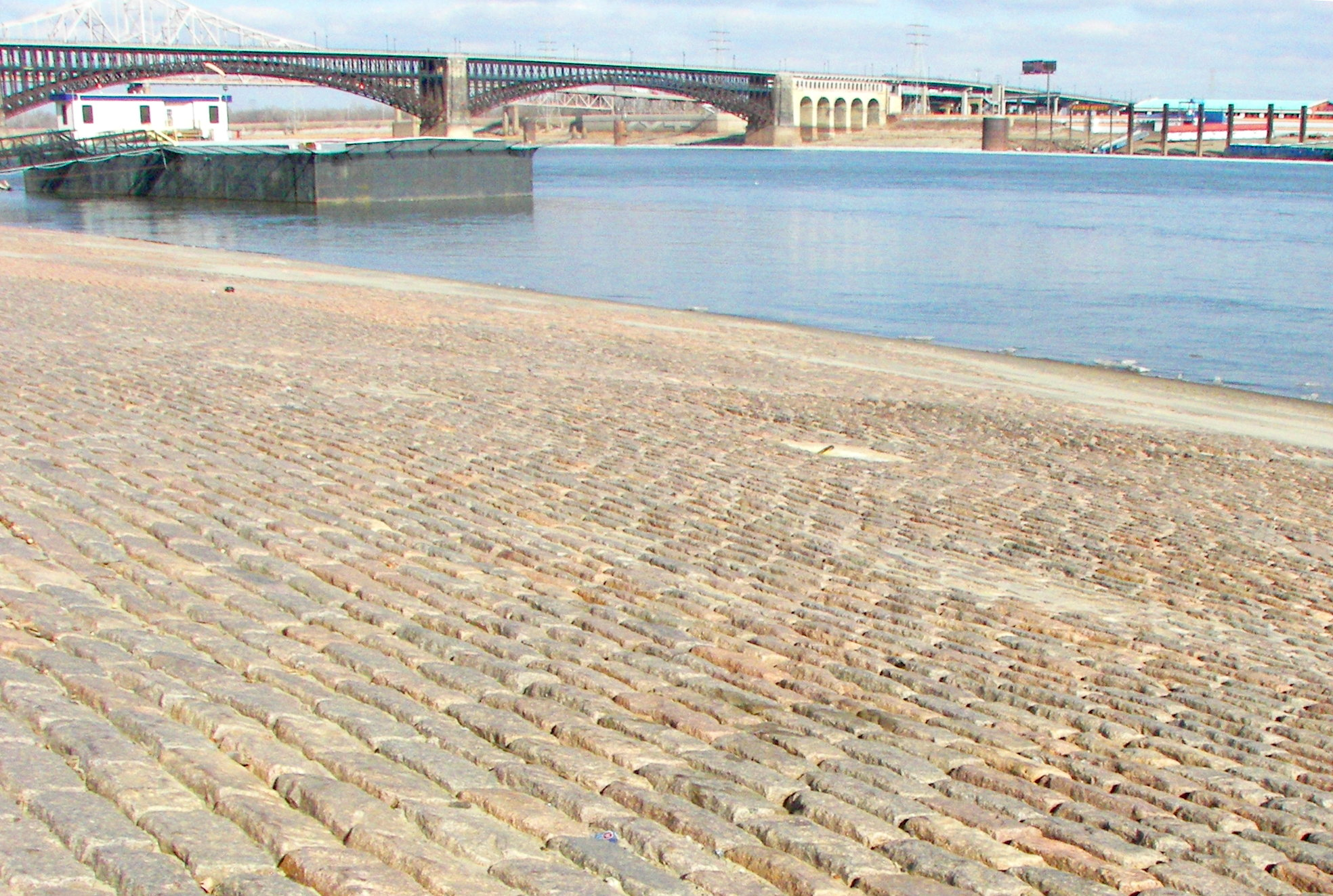
Granite was used for setts on the St. Louis riverfront and for the piers of the Eads Bridge (background)

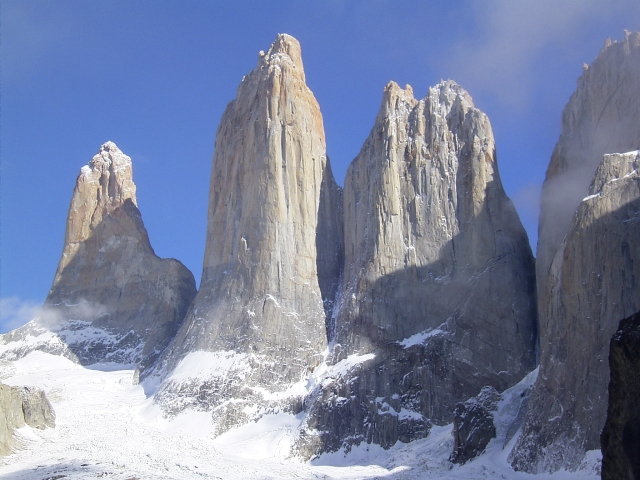
The granite peaks of the Cordillera Paine in the Chilean Patagonia

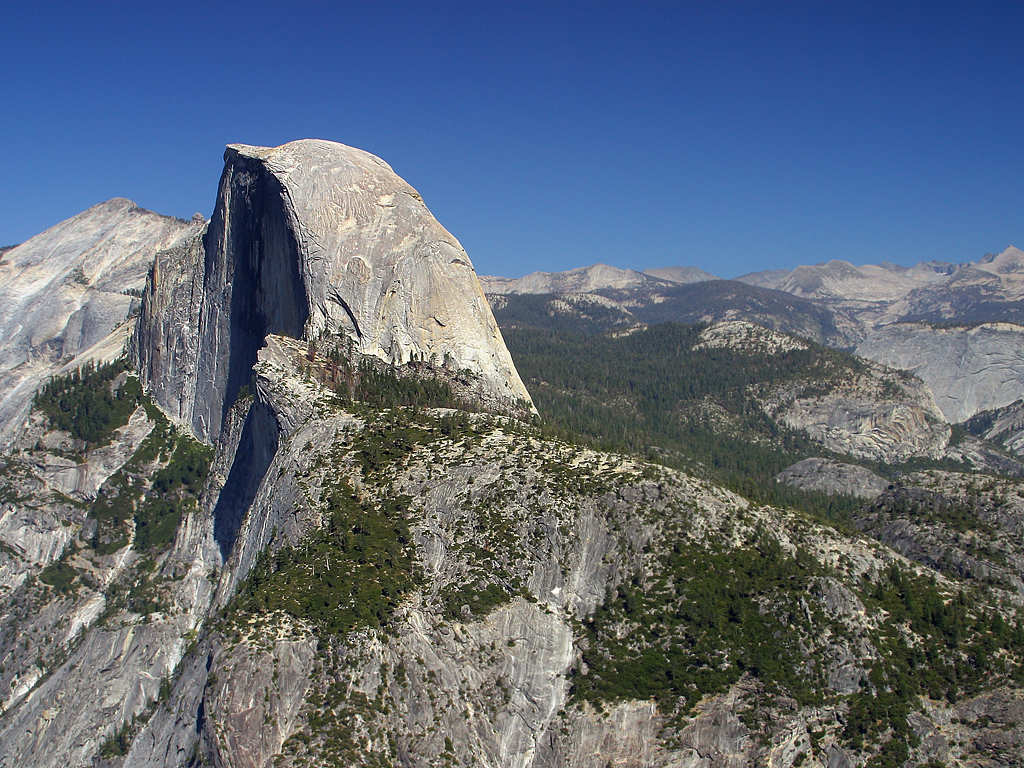
Half Dome, Yosemite National Park, is a granite peak cut by ice action and is a popular rock climbing destination

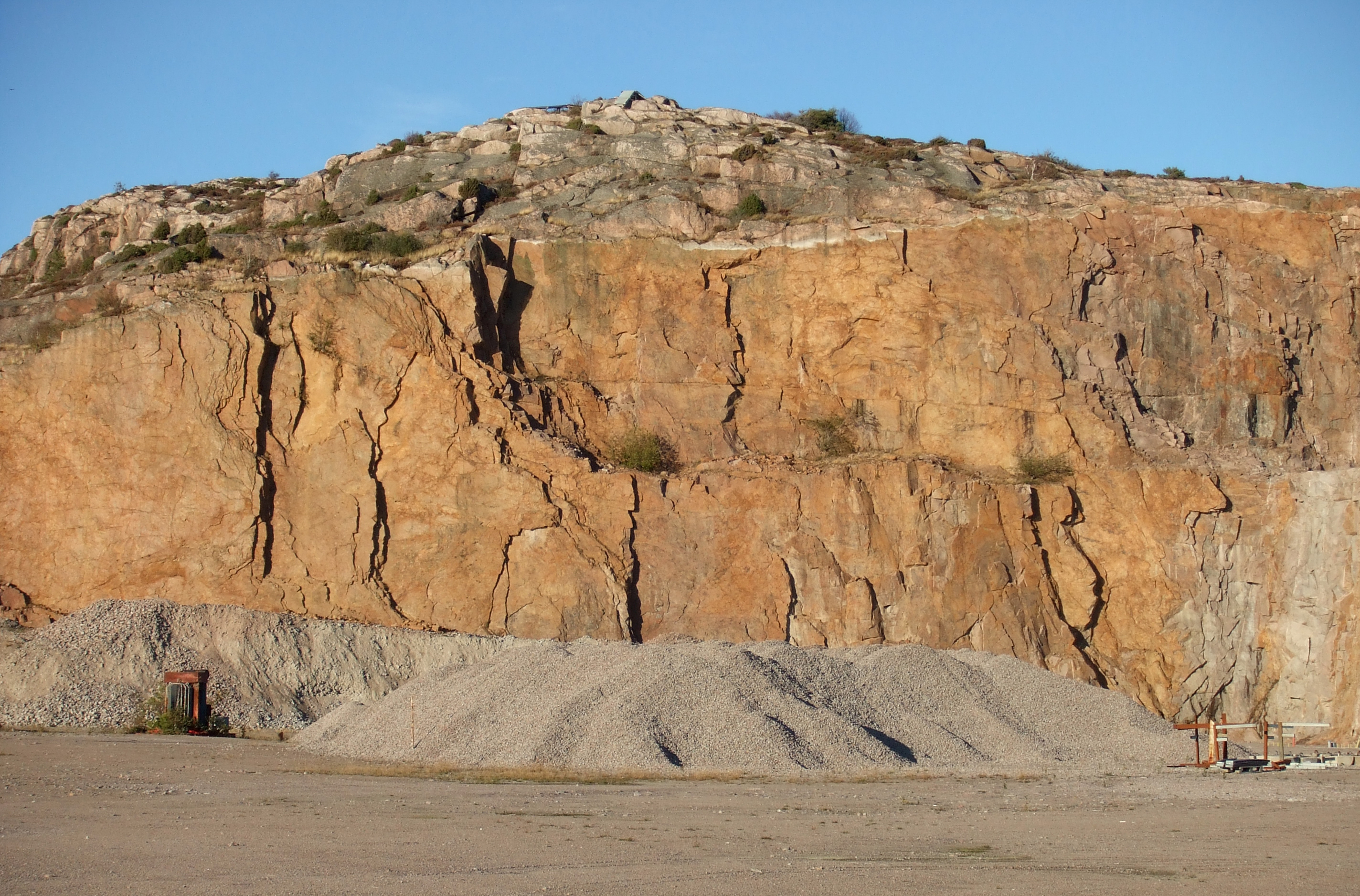
Rixö red granite quarry in Lysekil, Sweden

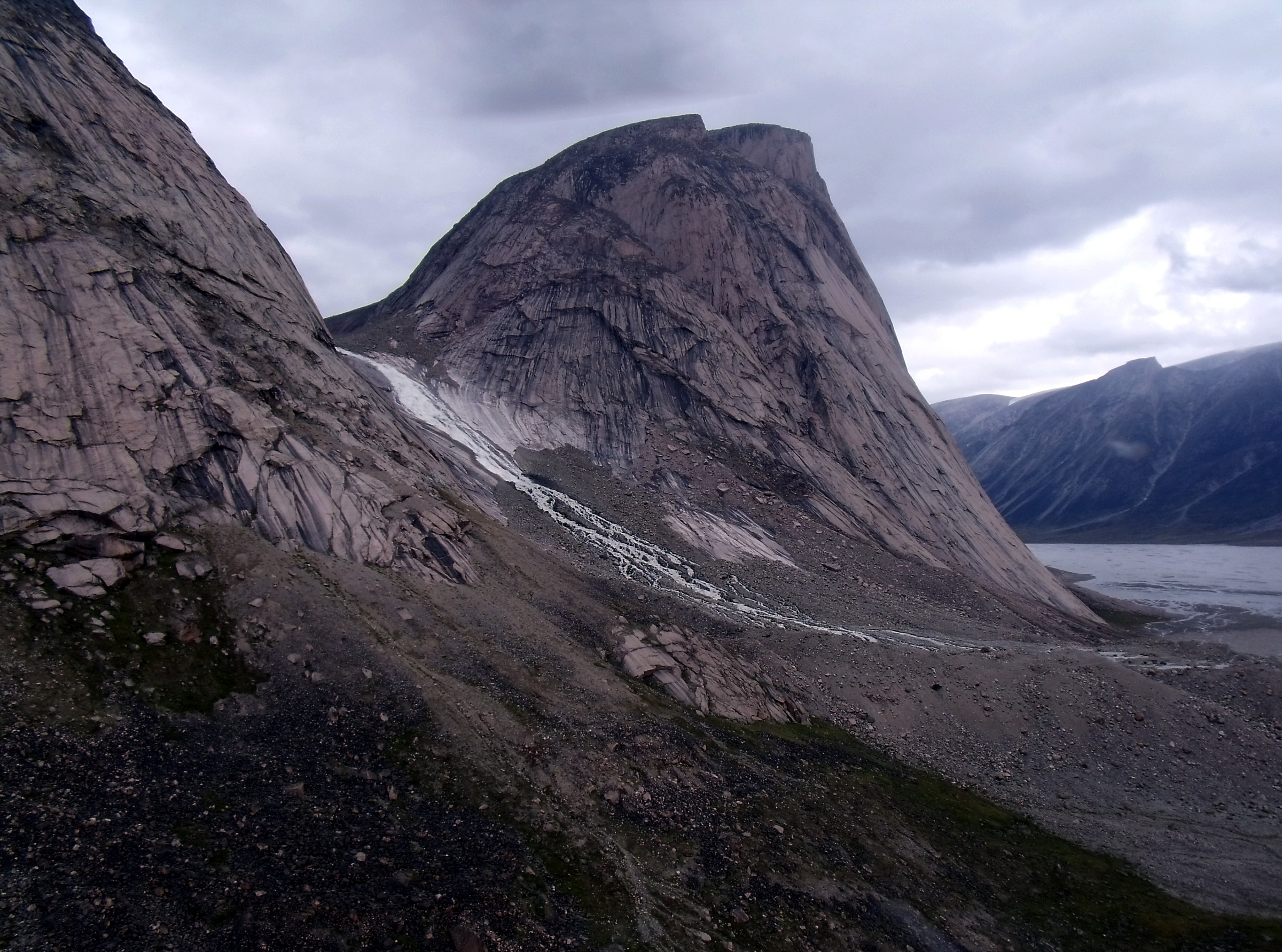
Granite in Auyuittuq National Park on Baffin Island, Canada

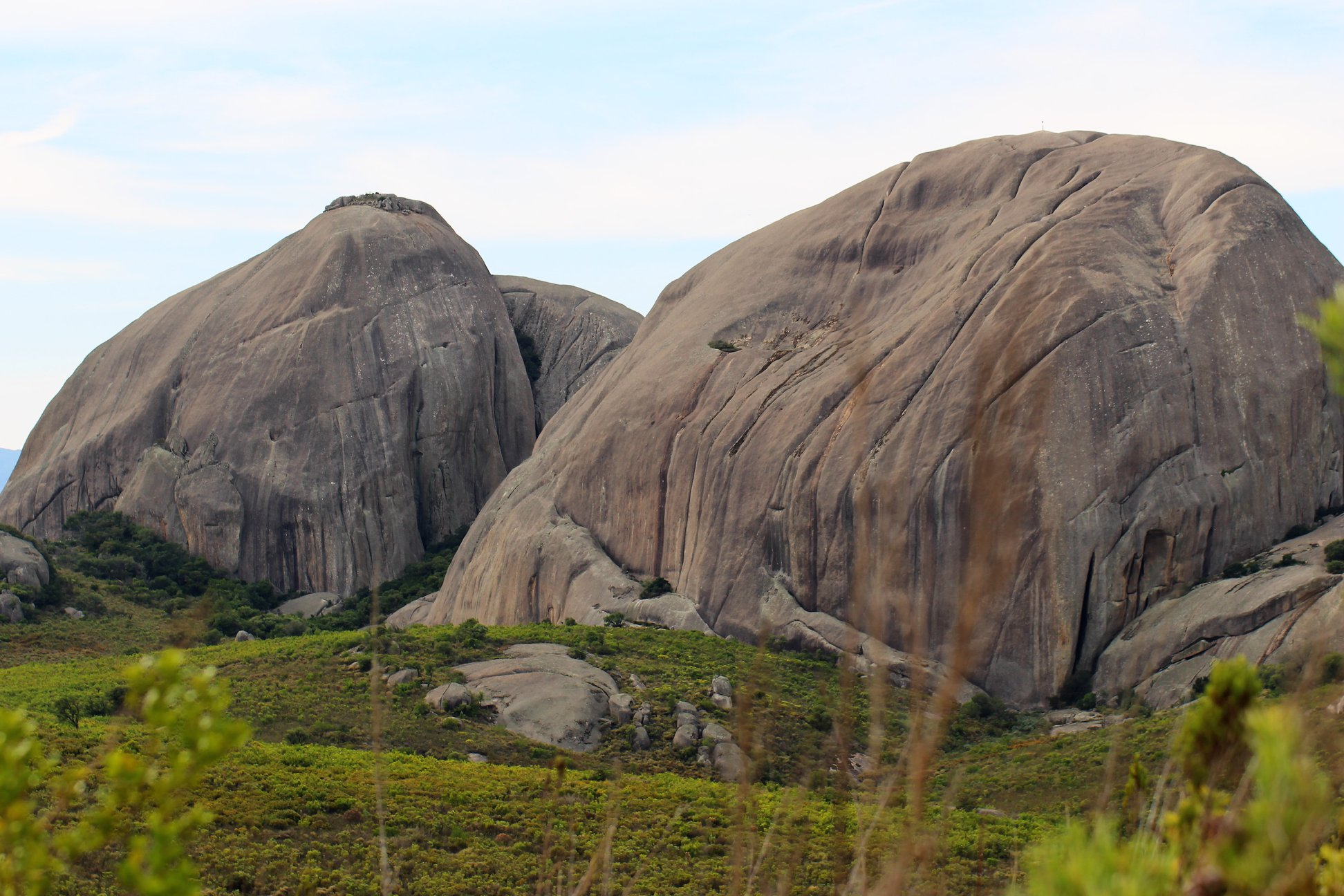
Granite in Paarl, South Africa

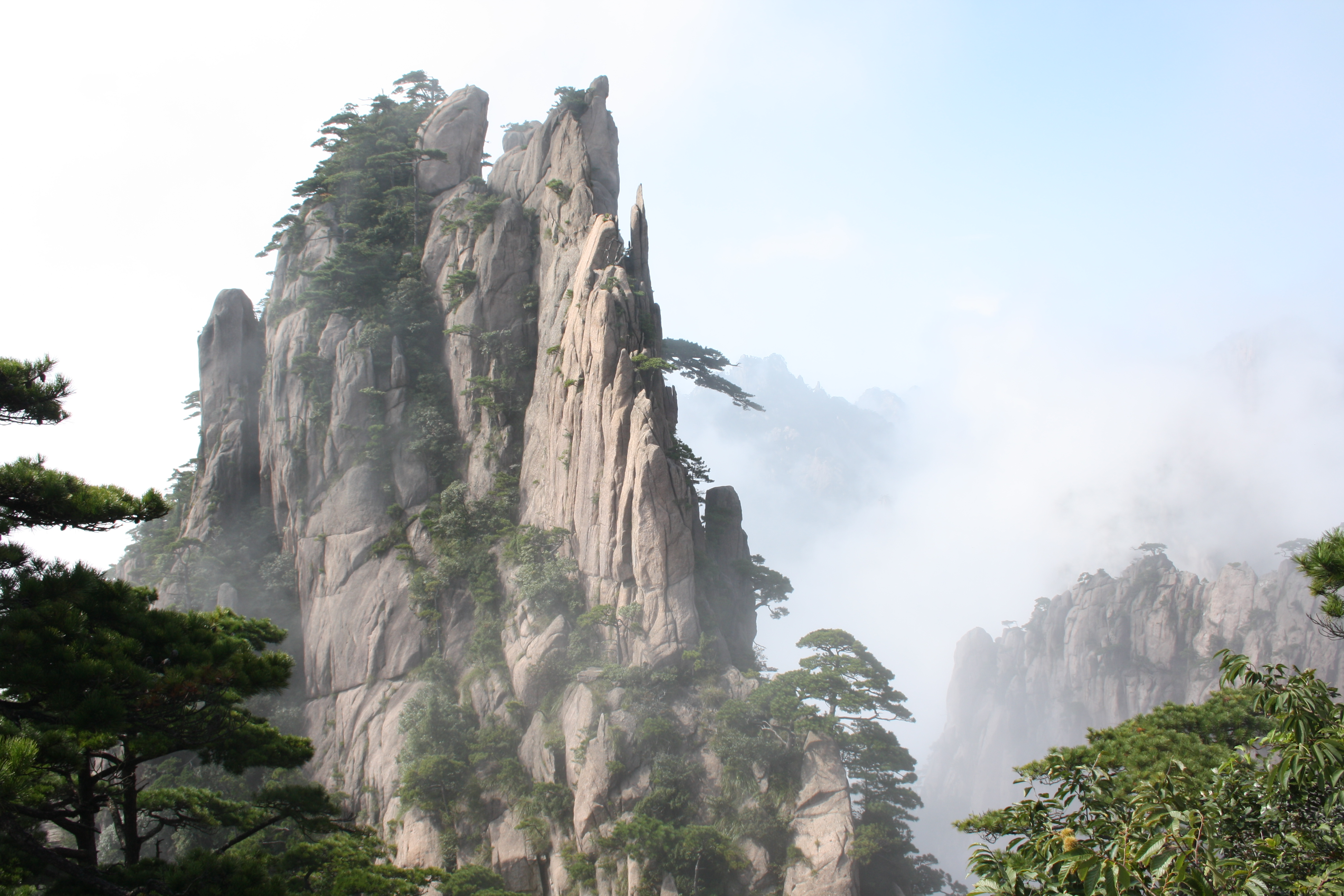
A granite peak at Huangshan, China

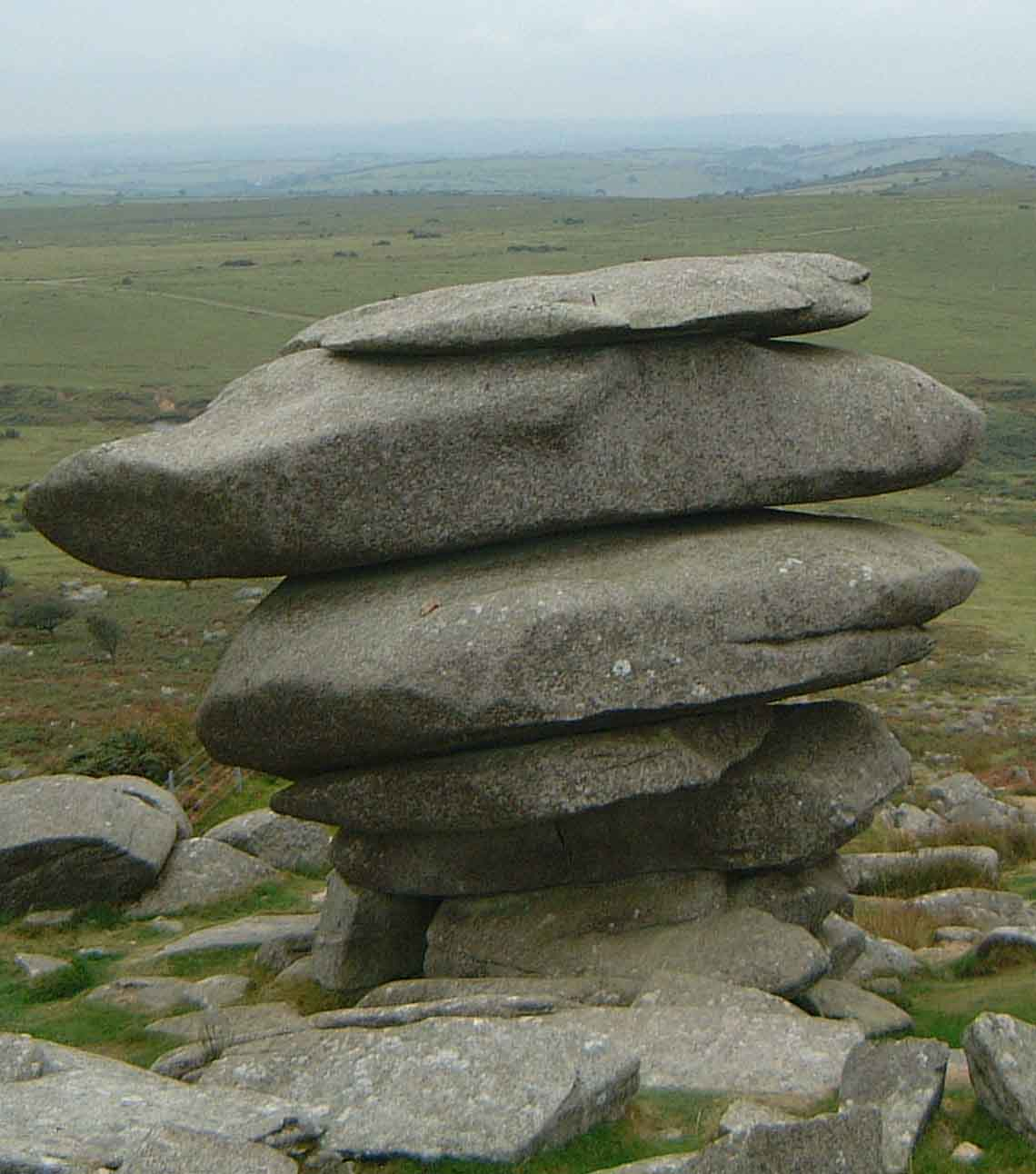
The Cheesewring, a granite tor in Cornwall, UK

Granite cliff overlooking Saucepan Creek, Mawson Plateau, South Australia.

== See also ==
- Exfoliating granite – Granite spalling in superficial layers due to temperature cycles
- Greisen – Highly altered granitic rock or pegmatite
- Hypersolvus – Type of granite, with a single feldspar
- List of rock types
- Luxullianite – Rare type of granite
- Orbicular granite – Uncommon plutonic rock type
- Quartz monzonite – Type of igneous rock
- Rapakivi granite – Type of igneous rock
- Subsolvus – Two feldspar granite
