= Perthite =

Intergrowth of two feldspars

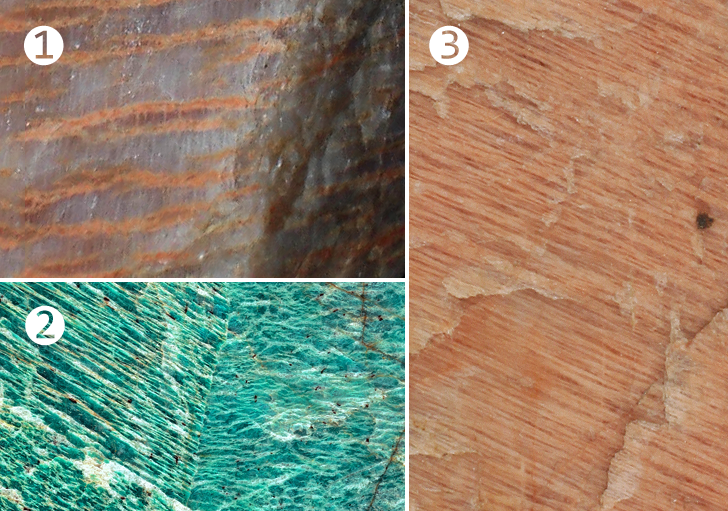
Perthitic textures: antiperthite (1), perthite (2), and mesoperthite (3)

Perthite or perthitic texture is used to describe an intergrowth of two feldspars: a host grain of potassium-rich alkali feldspar (near K-feldspar, KAlSi_{3}O_{8}, in composition) includes exsolved lamellae or irregular intergrowths of sodic alkali feldspar (near albite, NaAlSi_{3}O_{8}, in composition). Typically, the host grain is orthoclase or microcline, and the lamellae are albite. If sodic feldspar is the dominant phase, the result is an antiperthite and where the feldspars are in roughly equal proportions the result is a mesoperthite.

The intergrowth forms by exsolution due to cooling of a grain of alkali feldspar with a composition intermediate between K-feldspar and albite. There is complete solid solution between albite and K-feldspar at temperatures near 700 °C and pressures like those within the crust of the Earth, but a miscibility gap is present at lower temperatures. If an alkali feldspar grain with an intermediate composition cools slowly enough, K-rich and more Na-rich feldspar domains separate from one another. In the presence of water, the process occurs quickly.

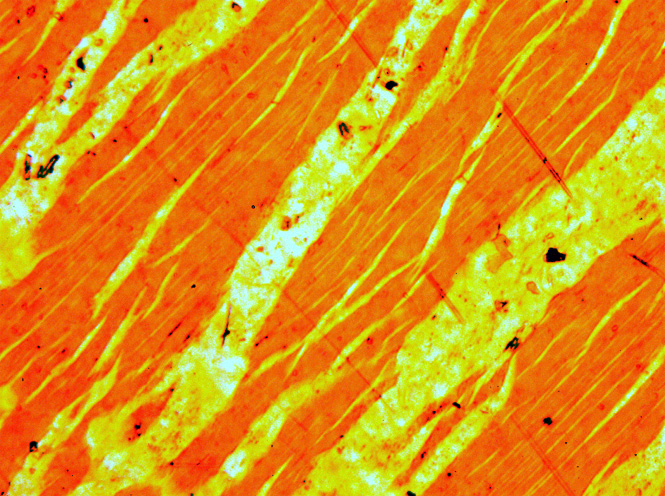
A photomicrograph of a perthite part of a feldspar grain in thin section as viewed through a petrographic microscope and with a first-order red plate. The K-feldspar host (orthoclase) appears orange, and albite exsolution lamellae appear yellow. The longer dimension of the field is 0.4 mm.

When megascopically developed, the texture may consist of distinct pink and white lamellae representing exsolved white albite (NaAlSi_{3}O_{8}) in pink microcline. The intergrowths in perthite have a great variety of shapes. If cooling is sufficiently slow, the alkali feldspar may exsolve to form separate grains with near-endmember albite and K-feldspar compositions. The largest documented single crystal of perthite was found in Hugo Mine in South Dakota and measured about 10.7 m (35 ft) × 4.6 m (15 ft) × 1.8 m (5 ft 11 in).

The gem varieties of potassium feldspar, amazonite and moonstone are variant colored perthites.
