= Isograd =

Geological term relating to metamorphic rocks

An isograd is a concept used in the study of metamorphic rocks. The metamorphic grade of such a rock is a rough measure of the degree of metamorphism it has undergone, as characterised by the presence of certain index minerals. An isograd is a theoretical surface comprising points all at the same metamorphic grade, and thus separates metamorphic zones whose rocks contain different index minerals.

On geological maps focusing on metamorphic terranes (or landscapes underlain by metamorphic rocks), the boundaries between rocks of different metamorphic grade are commonly demarcated by isograd lines. The garnet isograd, for example, would separate regions containing garnet from those without.

The minerals present in a metamorphic rock are important because laboratory experiments at high pressures and temperatures have provided a lot of information on the pressure and temperature conditions under which certain metamorphic minerals form. For example, with increasing temperature and pressure the first minerals to form from a shale are micas, particularly chlorite and biotite. With increasing temperature and pressure garnet appears, and then kyanite (at relatively high pressure) or sillimanite (at relatively high temperature). The metamorphic zone with chlorite can be referred to as the chlorite zone, the zone with garnet as garnet zone, and so forth. To communicate this easily, the dominant metamorphic minerals in schists are usually included in the name, as, for example, garnet schist, or garnet-staurolite schist, and so forth.

== See also ==
- Metamorphism
- Metamorphic facies
