= Metamorphic (disambiguation) =

Metamorphic can mean:

== Computing ==
- Metamorphic code, a programming technique used to disguise code in computer viruses
- Metamorphic testing, a software testing technique

== Science ==
- Metamorphic rock, rocks that have been transformed by extreme heat and pressure
- Metamorphic core complex, exposures of deep crust exhumed in association with largely amagmatic extension
- Metamorphic reaction, a chemical reaction that takes place during the geological process of metamorphism
- Metamorphic facies, a set of metamorphic mineral assemblages that are formed under similar pressures and temperatures
- Metamorphic zone, an area where, as a result of metamorphism, the same combination of minerals occurs in the bed rocks

== Other uses ==
- Metamorphic library steps, a piece of 18th century folding furniture
- Metamorphic Ventures, a New York-based venture capital firm
- Metamorphic Force, an arcade game released by Konami in August 1993
- Metamorphic (album) by STAYC, 2024
- Metamorphic solar cells, a type of multi-junction solar cell
