= Petrogenetic grid =

Pressure-temperature diagram of mineral stability ranges

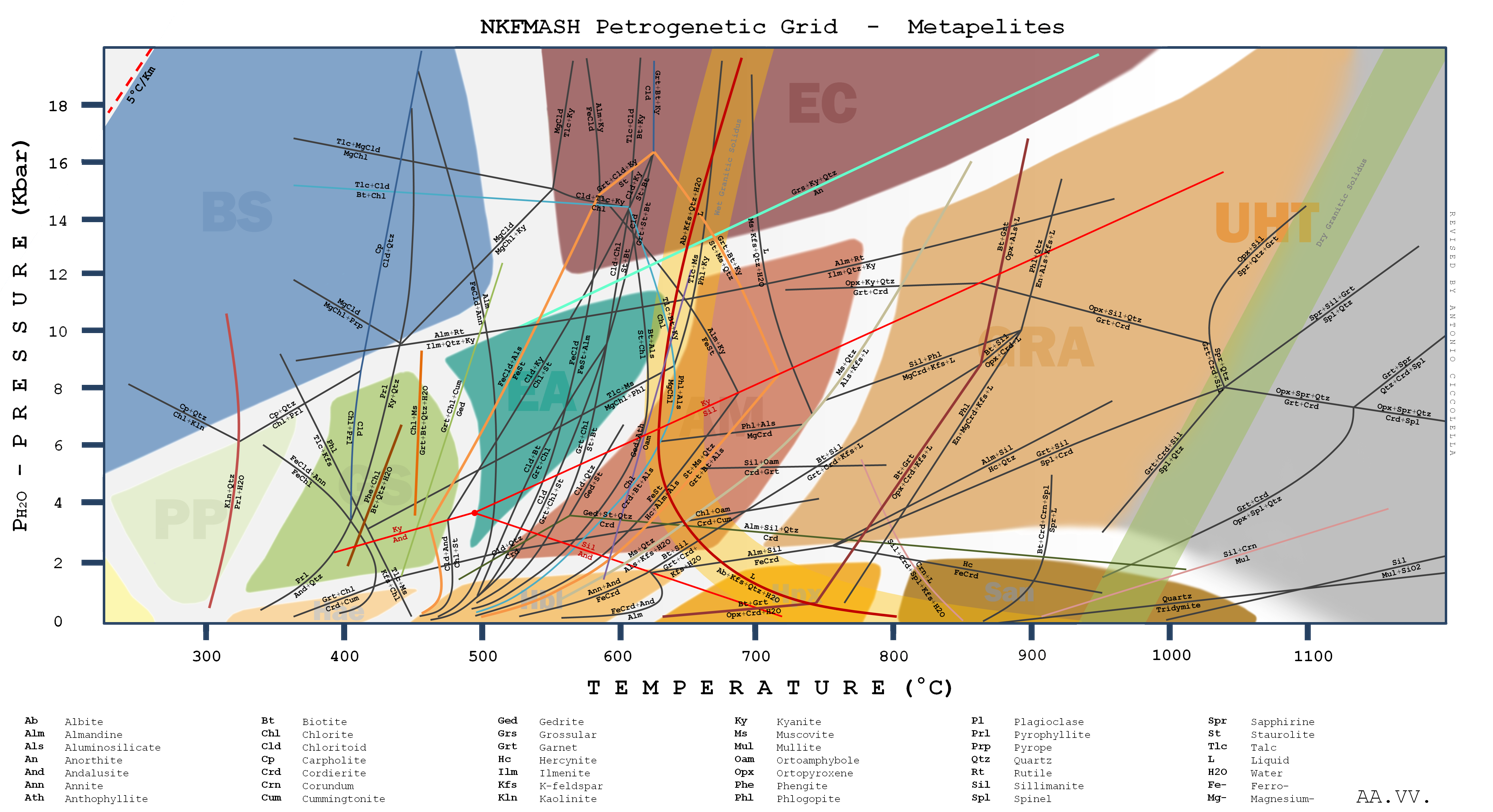
Figure 1. Petrogenetic grid for metapelites (several authors). Metamorphic facies included are: BS = Blueschist facies, EC = Eclogite facies, PP = Prehnite-Pumpellyite facies, GS = Granulite facies, EA = Epidote-Amphibolite facies, AM = Amphibolite facies, GRA = Granulite facies, UHT = Ultra-High Temperature facies, HAE = Hornfels-Albite-Epidote facies, Hbl = Hornblende-Hornfels facies, HPX = Hornfels-Pyroxene Facies, San = Sanidinite facies

A petrogenetic grid is a geological phase diagram that connects the stability ranges or metastability ranges of metamorphic minerals or mineral assemblages to the conditions of metamorphism. Experimentally determined mineral or mineral-assemblage stability ranges are plotted as metamorphic reaction boundaries in a pressure–temperature cartesian coordinate system to produce a petrogenetic grid for a particular rock composition. The regions of overlap of the stability fields of minerals form equilibrium mineral assemblages used to determine the pressure–temperature conditions of metamorphism. This is particularly useful in geothermobarometry.

Figure 1 is an example of a complex petrogenetic grid for metamorphosed pelitic rocks. It shows most of the important reactions that govern the development of aluminous mineral assemblages from the prehnite-pumpellyite facies to the granulite facies, as well as the blueschist facies and eclogite facies at higher pressures and the contact hornfels facies at lower pressures. As the rock undergoes higher temperatures and pressures, it follows the classic Barrovian sequence from the chlorite zone to the biotite zone to the garnet zone to the staurolite zone.

For a metapelitic rock containing chlorite, kaolinite, and quartz the petrogenetic grid for metapelites (Figure 1) shows that such a rock can only form at relatively low pressures and temperatures. However, if it had carpholite instead of chlorite, then it would have formed at higher pressures, and if it had pyrophyllite instead of kaolinite, it would have formed at higher temperatures. This assumes the rock has a KFMASH (K_{2}O–FeO–MgO–Al_{2}O_{3}–SiO_{2}–H_{2}O) composition because that is what the experimental data was created with. If the composition of the rock differs from this, then the figure is less accurate.

Norman L. Bowen proposed the concept of petrogenetic grids in 1940. At the time, he envisioned geologists eventually determining every possible metamorphic reaction and assemblage in nature, but realized that the magnitude of undertaking the necessary experiments was a huge task that would not be finished for a very long time. As such, modern petrogenetic grids are only partially complete. Depending on the level of precision and characterization needed, a petrogenetic grid may be simple, or it may be an extremely large system consisting of a hundred or more reactions.

Phase diagram of Al_{2}SiO_{5}
(aluminosilicates).

== See also ==
- Compatibility diagram – Depicts coexisting mineral phases in a metamorphic rock
- Metamorphic rock – Rock that was subjected to heat and pressure
