= Ultra-high-temperature metamorphism =

Crustal metamorphism with temperatures exceeding 900 °C

In geology ultrahigh-temperature metamorphism (UHT) is extreme crustal metamorphism with metamorphic temperatures exceeding 900 °C. Granulite-facies rocks metamorphosed at very high temperatures were identified in the early 1980s, although it took another decade for the geoscience community to recognize UHT metamorphism as a common regional phenomenon. Petrological evidence based on characteristic mineral assemblages backed by experimental and thermodynamic relations demonstrated that Earth's crust can attain and withstand very high temperatures (900–1000 °C) with or without partial melting.

== Definition ==
Metamorphism of crustal rocks in which peak temperature exceeds 900 °C, recognized either by robust thermobarometry or by the presence of a diagnostic mineral assemblage in an appropriate bulk composition and oxidation state, such as assemblages with orthopyroxene + sillimanite + quartz, sapphirine + quartz or spinel + quartz, generally at pressure conditions of sillimanite stability in metapelites [after Brown (2007) following proposal by Harley (1998)].

== Identification ==
Petrological indicators of UHT metamorphism are usually preserved in extremely Mg-Al-rich rocks which are usually dry and restitic in nature. Mineral assemblages such as sapphirine + quartz, orthopyroxene + sillimanite ± quartz, osumilite and spinel + quartz provide straight away evidence for such extreme conditions. Occasionally widespread assemblages like garnet + orthopyroxene, ternary feldspars, (F-Ti) pargasite or metamorphic inverted pigeonite are taken as typical indicators of UHT metamorphism.

== Global distribution ==
UHT rocks are now identified in all major continents and span different geological ages ranging from c. 3178 to 35 million years associated with major geological events. More than 46 localities/terranes with diagnostic UHT indicators have been reported over the globe, related to both extensional and collisional tectonic environments; the two fundamental types of Earth orogenic systems. The major Archean UHT rocks are distributed in East-Antarctica, South Africa, Russia and Canada. Paleoproterozoic UHT granulites were reported from the North China Craton (during the accretion of the supercontinent Columbia), Taltson magmatic zone, northwestern Canada and South Harris, Lewisian complex, Scotland. UHT rocks from the Neoproterozoic Grenville orogeny are distributed in the Eastern Ghats Province, India. Neoproterozoic-Cambrian (Pan-African) UHT occurrences are mainly distributed in Lutzow-Holm Bay, East Antarctica, southern Madagascar, Sri Lanka and southern India. UHT rocks are also reported from younger terranes like the Triassic Kontum Massif, Vietnam, Cretaceous Higo belt, Japan and Paleogene Gruf Complex, central Alps. Three-million-year-old xenoliths erupted in Qiangtang imply that UHT metamorphism is ongoing beneath central Tibet.

== Recent hypothesis ==
A correlation was proposed between the episodic formation of UHT metamorphic rocks and the episodic assembly of supercontinents in the Precambrian. However, inspection of extreme metamorphism at convergent plate margins indicates that supercontinental assembly is associated with regional HP to UHP eclogite-facies metamorphism at low thermal gradients of less than 10 °C/km, whereas continental rifting plays a crucial role in causing regional HT to UHT granulite-facies metamorphism at high thermal gradients of greater than 30 °C/km. In this regard, the episodic formation of HT to UHT granulite-facies metamorphic rocks is temporally and spatially coupled with the breakup or attempting rupture of supercontinents in the plate tectonics context.

Because UHT rocks are generally characterized by low water contents, this led to an illusion for the involvement of CO_{2}-rich fluids in generating diagnostic UHT assemblages according to the finding of abundant pure CO_{2} fluid inclusions in these rocks. However, the extraction of liquid phases such as aqueous solutions and hydrous melts from anatectic systems during UHT metamorphism is so efficient that the common occurrence of pure CO_{2} fluid inclusions looks as if the incoming CO_{2} could have buffered the water activity and stabilized the anhydrous mineralogy of UHT rocks. Anatectic melts were variably extracted from anatectic systems, leading to granulite-migmatite-granite associations in accretionary and collisional orogens. Metamorphic core complexes were emplaced due to the buoyant entrainment of granitic melts. The abundant water was liberated by heating dehydration of the lowest orogenic crust, contributing aqueous solutions to amphibolite-facies retrogression of the overlying crust.
