= Geology of Sri Lanka =

More than 90% of Sri Lanka's surface lies on Precambrian strata, some of it dating back 2 billion years. The granulite facies rocks of the Highland Series (gneisses, sillimanite-graphite gneisses, quartzite, marbles, and some charnockites) make up most of the island and the amphibolite facies gneisses, granites, and granitic gneisses of the Vijayan Series occur in the eastern and southeastern lowlands. Jurassic sediments are present today in very small areas near the western coast and Miocene limestones underlie the northwestern part of the country and extend south in a relatively narrow belt along the west coast. The metamorphic rock surface was created by the transformation of ancient sediments under intense heat and pressure during mountain-building processes. The theory of plate tectonics suggests that these rocks and related rocks forming most of south India were part of a single southern landmass called Gondwanaland. Beginning about 200 million years ago, forces within the Earth's mantle began to separate the lands of the Southern Hemisphere, and a crustal plate supporting both India and Sri Lanka moved toward the northeast. About 45 million years ago, the Indian plate collided with the Asian landmass, raising the Himalayas in northern India, and it continues to advance slowly to the present time. Sri Lanka does not experience earthquakes or major volcanic events because it rides on the center of the plate.

The island contains relatively limited strata of sedimentation surrounding its ancient uplands. Aside from recent deposits along river valleys, only two small fragments of Jurassic (140 to 190 million years ago) sediment occur in Puttalam District, while a more extensive belt of Miocene (5 to 20 million years ago) limestone is found along the northwest coast, overlain in many areas by Pleistocene (1 million years ago) deposits. The northwest coast is part of the deep Cauvery (Kaveri) River Basin of southeast India, which has been collecting sediments from the highlands of India and Sri Lanka since the breakup of Gondwanaland.
