= Renco, Zimbabwe =

Village in Masvingo Province, Zimbabwe

Coordinates: 20.633°S 31.170°E

Renco is a village in Masvingo Province, Zimbabwe and is located 70 km (43 mi) from Masvingo.

According to the 1982 Population Census, the village had a population of 3,817.

== Renco Gold Mine ==
The village grew up around the Renco gold mine. The gold mine originated in the 1930s but grew extensively after 1972 when Rio Tinto explored and developed the mine. It was officially opened in 1982 and in that year produced 1,242 KG of gold. It is now owned by Riozim. The Renco mine is the largest in Zimbabwe and sits within granulite facies metamorphic rock. The mine closed briefly following a period in the 2020s but was fully reopened in 2025.
