= Aluminium silicate =

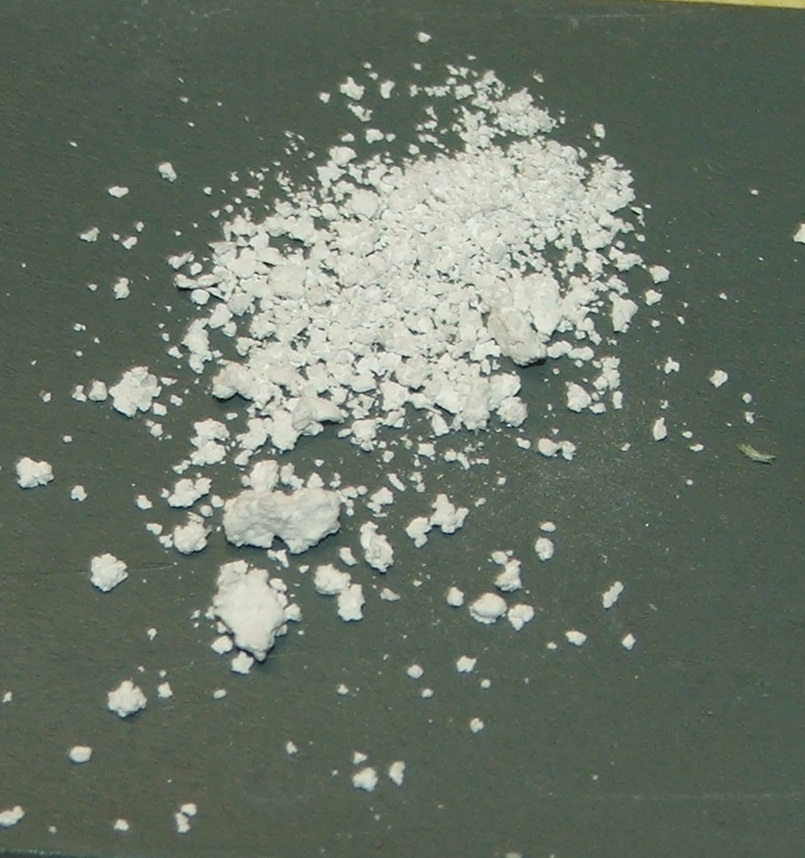

Identifiers
CAS Number	12141-46-7
3D model (JSmol)	Interactive image
ChemSpider	8488719
ECHA InfoCard	100.032.036
E number	E559 (acidity regulators, ...)
PubChem CID	10313254
UNII	T1FAD4SS2M
CompTox Dashboard (EPA)	DTXSID2050451
- InChI: InChI=1S/2Al.O3Si.2O/c;;1-4(2)3;;/q2*+1;-2;; Key: PZZYQPZGQPZBDN-UHFFFAOYSA-N
- SMILES: O=[Al]O[Si](=O)O[Al]=O

Properties
Chemical formula	Al_{2}SiO_{5}
Molar mass	162.0456 g mol^{−1}
- Except where otherwise noted, data are given for materials in their standard state (at 25 °C [77 °F], 100 kPa). verify (what is ?) Infobox references

Aluminum silicate (or aluminium silicate) is a name commonly applied to chemical compounds which are derived from aluminium oxide, Al_{2}O_{3} and silicon dioxide, SiO_{2} which may be anhydrous or hydrated, naturally occurring as minerals or synthetic. Their chemical formulae are often expressed as xAl_{2}O_{3}·ySiO_{2}·zH_{2}O. It is known as E number E559.

== Main representatives ==
Phase diagram of Al_{2}SiO_{5}
(aluminosilicates).

Andalusite, kyanite, and sillimanite are the principal aluminium silicate minerals. The triple point of the three polymorphs is located at a temperature of 500 °C (932 °F) and a pressure of 0.4 GPa (58,000 psi). These three minerals are commonly used as index minerals in metamorphic rocks.

- Al_{2}SiO_{5}, (Al_{2}O_{3}·SiO_{2}), which occurs naturally as the minerals andalusite, kyanite and sillimanite which have distinct crystal structures.
- Al_{2}Si_{2}O_{7}, (Al_{2}O_{3}·2SiO_{2}), called metakaolinite, formed from kaolin by heating at 450 °C (842 °F).
- Al_{6}Si_{2}O_{13}, (3Al_{2}O_{3}·2SiO_{2}), the mineral mullite, the only thermodynamically stable intermediate phase in the Al_{2}O_{3}-SiO_{2} system at atmospheric pressure. This also called '3:2 mullite' to distinguish it from 2Al_{2}O_{3}·SiO_{2}, Al_{4}SiO_{8} '2:1 mullite'.
- 2Al_{2}O_{3}·SiO_{2}, Al_{4}SiO_{8} '2:1 mullite'.

The above list mentions ternary materials (Si-Al-O). Kaolinite is a quaternary material (Si-Al-O-H). Also called aluminium silicate dihydrate, kaolinite occurs naturally as a mineral. Its formula is Al_{2}Si_{2}O_{5}(OH)_{4}, (Al_{2}O_{3}·2SiO_{2}·2H_{2}O).

== Aluminium silicate composite materials, fibres ==
Aluminium silicate is a type of fibrous material made of aluminium oxide and silicon dioxide, (such materials are also called aluminosilicate fibres). These are glassy solid solutions rather than chemical compounds. The compositions are often described in terms of % weight of alumina, Al_{2}O_{3} and silica, SiO_{2}. Temperature resistance increases as the % alumina increases. These fibrous materials can be encountered as loose wool, blanket, felt, paper or boards.
