= Fibrolite =

Fibrolite may refer to:

- Sillimanite, an aluminosilicate mineral
- Asbestos cement, a composite building material
