= Metamorphic zone =

Geological region of uniform bedrock

Schematic map of a terrane with an increasing metamorphic grade. There are two folded lithologies: quartzite (originally sandy sediment) and pelite (originally clayey sediment). The index minerals can only grow in the pelite. The highest indicated isograd is the solidus of hydrated granite, at higher metamorphic grade partial melting occurred in the quartzite.

Metamorphic zones in Scottish Highlands, the region where they were first recognized by geologist George Barrow in 1912. Most of the region has Barrow zones, but an area north of Aberdeen has Buchan zones (andalusite and biotite).

In geology, a metamorphic zone is an area where, as a result of metamorphism, the same combination of minerals occur in the bedrock. These zones occur because most metamorphic minerals are only stable in certain intervals of temperature and pressure.

== Concept ==
The temperature and pressure at which the mineralogical composition of a rock equilibrated can vary laterally through a metamorphic terrane. The two parameters together determine the metamorphic grade. The difference in grade between two locations is called the metamorphic gradient. Planes that connect points with the same metamorphic grade are called isograds. The secant lines of isograds with the surface form lines on a geological map.

Changes in mineralogical composition in a terrane reflect differences in metamorphic grade of the rocks. Minerals that are characteristic for a certain metamorphic grade are called index minerals. The first or last appearance of an index mineral (the place where a metamorphic reaction is observed) forms an easily recognizable isograd. A metamorphic zone is the region between two such easily recognizable isograds. Often they are named for the most characteristic index mineral of the zone.

Whether a certain index mineral occurs is also dependent on the composition of the rock itself. Many index minerals have complicated chemical compositions. If not all necessary elements are abundant, the mineral will not grow. When mapping the metamorphic grade of a terrane, a geologist has to take the lithology of the rock in account. Lithologies are mainly dependent on the protolith, the original rock before metamorphism. The main lithologies are ultramafic, mafic, felsic (or quartzo-feldspathic), pelitic and calcareous. In all of these (and other) lithologies, different combinations of minerals occur at a certain grade. The metamorphic zones in these lithologies can also be different.

== Types of metamorphic zones ==
The type of metamorphic zones in a terrane are also determined by the form of metamorphism. This is dependent on the geodynamic (tectonic and magmatic) setting in which metamorphism took place. The sequence of metamorphic zones is called a metamorphic facies series, and the most common of these is Barrovian (called after George Barrow who first mentioned it in 1912). In this series of zones, both pressure and temperature increase gradually along the metamorphic gradient. Barrovian metamorphism takes place during regional metamorphism, caused by crustal thickening in the roots of an orogenic belt (under mountain chains). Barrovian zones are especially easy to recognize in pelitic rocks. The prograde sequence of Barrovian zones is:

chlorite - biotite - garnet - staurolite - kyanite - sillimanite

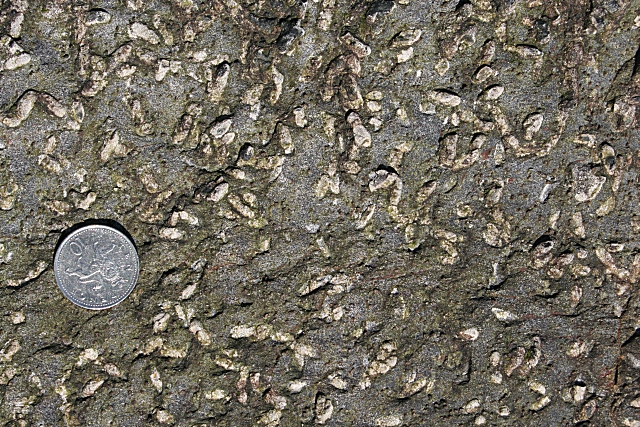
Andalusite crystals in Dalradian metamorphic rock at Boyndie Bay in the Buchan metamorphic zone of north-east Scotland

Often only part of the series can be found. Another metamorphic facies series is the Buchan series, that sees a fast increase in temperature but a relatively small increase in pressure. Characteristic minerals include andalusite, biotite and cordierite. The metamorphic prograde sequence of the Buchan zone series is:

biotite - cordierite - andalusite - sillimanite

Buchan metamorphism occurs often in extensional settings, for example at rift basins. In contact metamorphism (metamorphism caused by high temperatures at low pressure in the vicinity of an igneous intrusion) a local contact aureole of zones is formed around a heat source.

In rocks in subduction zones, that are transported to great depths in relatively low temperatures, rare types of metamorphic zones can develop. Two facies series are the Franciscan and Sanbagawa types. The rocks are characterized by prehnite-pumpellyite, blueschist or eclogite facies minerals.

== See also ==
- Metamorphism
- Metamorphic facies
- Anatexis
- Metamorphic rock
