= Metamorphic reaction =

Chemical reaction between minerals within metamorphic rock

Schematic representation of a metamorphic reaction. Abbreviations of minerals: act = actinolite; chl = chlorite; ep = epidote; gt = garnet; hbl = hornblende; plag = plagioclase. Two minerals represented in the figure ( and ) do not participate in the reaction; example minerals could be quartz and K-feldspar. This reaction takes place in nature when a mafic rock goes from amphibolite facies to greenschist facies.

In geochemistry, a metamorphic reaction is a chemical reaction that takes place during the geological process of metamorphism wherein one assemblage of minerals is transformed into a second assemblage which is stable under the new temperature/pressure conditions, resulting in the final stable state of the observed metamorphic rock.

Examples include the production of talc under varied metamorphic conditions:

serpentine + carbon dioxide → talc + magnesite + water
chlorite + quartz → kyanite + talc + water

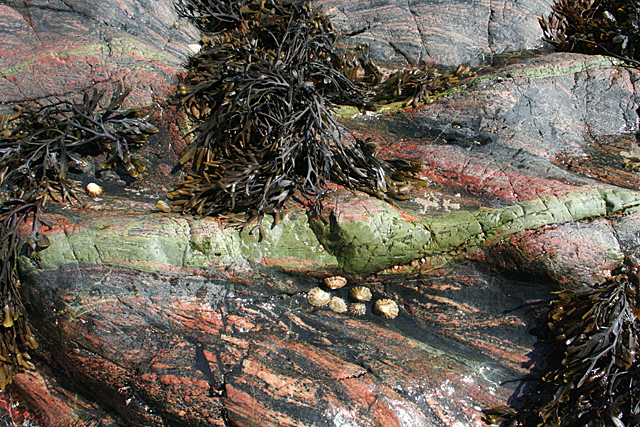
Epidotisation in Argyll and Bute, U.K

== See also ==
- Index mineral
