= Delaware Mineralogical Society =

Non-profit organization in Delaware, US

- Formation: 1960
- Location: Wilmington, Delaware
- Website: dmsrocks.org

The Delaware Mineralogical Society, Inc., also known as DMS, is a U.S. registered tax-deductible 503(c)(3) non-profit organization located in Wilmington, Delaware, US. Its primary purpose is to promote education in the earth sciences.

DMS was instrumental in the recommendation of Delaware's official mineral Sillimanite to the Delaware State Legislature in 1977.

== History ==
The Delaware Mineralogical Society was founded in 1960. Its members have professional and hobbyist interests in geology, mineralogy, paleontology, and the lapidary arts. Some members are professional scientists and educators, such as chemists, geologists, school teachers, and college professors. Students also make up a portion of the society's membership. The club hosts educational programs, field trips, and an annual show the first full weekend in March.

The monthly newsletter, The Geogram, is published every month, except July and August. The group has also published over 60 articles about specific geological topics on its website. Two of its senior members have published books on paleontology.

== Affiliations ==
The Society is a member of two larger organizations: The American Federation of Mineralogical Societies, the Eastern Federation of Mineralogical and Lapidary Societies, Inc. DMS also has a service affiliation with the Delaware Geological Survey.

The Society has an ongoing educational partnership with the Delaware Museum of Natural History in Wilmington, Delaware.
