= George Barrow (geologist) =

British geologist

George Barrow (11 December 1853 – 23 July 1932) was a British geologist.

Barrow was born in St George Hanover Square, London, the fifth of eight children born to John George Barrow, a general practitioner at the Royal College of Surgeons, and his wife, Eleanor Barrow.

Barrow matriculated at London University in 1871, holding a Turner scholarship. Admitted to King's College London, he studied science, winning prizes in mathematics and geology. He was the first to map a metamorphic gradient by determining a sequence of metamorphic zones in the metapelites of the Scottish Highlands. Every first appearance of an index mineral was taken by Barrow as the beginning of a new metamorphic zone. Later, the underlying principles of metamorphic zones were clarified by the Finnish geologist Pentti Eskola, who introduced the concept of metamorphic facies. Barrow was awarded the Bolitho Medal of the Royal Geological Society of Cornwall in 1912.

He died in Chorleywood, Hertfordshire.

The Barrow Award of the Mineralogical Society of Great Britain & Ireland for contributions to metamorphic geology is named in his honour.

== Selected publications ==
- Barrow, George (1888). The geology of North Cleveland. (Explanation of quarter-sheets 104 S. W. S. E., new series, sheets 34, 35). Memoirs of the Geological Survey. London: Her Majesty's Stationery Office (HMSO).
- Barrow, George (1904). "On the Moine Gneisses of the East-Central Highlands and their Position in the Highland Sequence". Quarterly Journal of the Geological Society of London. 60 (1–4): 400–449. Bibcode:1904QJGS...60..400B. doi:10.1144/GSL.JGS.1904.060.01-04.35. S2CID 130627328.
- Barrow, George; Flett, John S. (1906). The geology of the Isles of Scilly (Explanation of Sheets 357 and 360). Memoirs of the Geological Survey. London: Her Majesty's Stationery Office (HMSO).
- Barrow, George; Wills, L.J. (1913). Records of London wells. Memoirs of the Geological Survey. London: Her Majesty's Stationery Office (HMSO).
- Barrow, George (1919). The geology of the country around Lichfield, including the northern parts of the South Staffordshire and Warwickshire coalfields (Explanation of Sheet 154). Memoirs of the Geological Survey. London: Her Majesty's Stationery Office (HMSO).
