= Granulite =

Class of high-grade medium to coarse grained metamorphic rocks

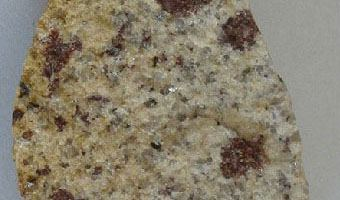
A sample of granulite-facies metamorphic rock of felsic composition, with garnet porphyroblasts

Granulites are a class of high-grade metamorphic rocks that have experienced high-temperature and moderate-pressure metamorphism. They are medium to coarse–grained and mainly composed of feldspars sometimes associated with quartz and anhydrous ferromagnesian minerals, with granoblastic texture and gneissose to massive structure. They are of particular interest to geologists because many granulites represent samples of the deep continental crust. Some granulites experienced decompression from deep in the Earth to shallower crustal levels at high temperature; others cooled while remaining at depth in the Earth.

The minerals present in a granulite will vary depending on the parent rock of the granulite and the temperature and pressure conditions experienced during metamorphism. A common type of granulite found in high-grade metamorphic rocks of the continents contains pyroxene, plagioclase feldspar and accessory garnet, oxides and possibly amphiboles. Both clinopyroxene and orthopyroxene may be present, and in fact, the coexistence of clino- and orthopyroxene in a metabasite (metamorphed basalt) defines the granulite facies.

A granulite may be visually quite distinct with abundant small pink or red pyralspite garnets in a 'granular' holocrystalline matrix. Concentrations of garnets, micas, or amphiboles may form along a linear pattern resembling gneiss or migmatite banding.

Diagram showing metamorphic facies in pressure-temperature space. The domain of the graph corresponds to circumstances within the Earth's crust and upper mantle.

== Formation ==
Granulites form at crustal depths, typically during regional metamorphism at high thermal gradients of greater than 30 °C/km. In continental crustal rocks, biotite may break down at high temperatures to form orthopyroxene + potassium feldspar + water, producing a granulite. Other possible minerals formed at dehydration melting conditions include sapphirine, spinel, sillimanite, and osumilite. Some assemblages such as sapphirine + quartz indicate very high temperatures of greater than 900 °C. Some granulites may represent the residues of partial melting at extraction of felsic melts in variable amounts, and in extreme cases represent rocks that all constituent minerals are anhydrous and thus look as if they did not melt at ultrahigh temperature conditions. Therefore, very high temperatures of 900 to 1150 °C are even necessary to produce the granulite-facies mineral assemblages. Such high temperatures at crustal depths only can be delivered by upwelling of the asthenospheric mantle in continental rifting settings, which can cause the regional metamorphism at the high thermal gradients of greater than 30 °C/km.

== Granulite facies ==
The granulite facies is determined by the lower temperature boundary of 700 ± 50 °C and the pressure range of 2–15 kb. The most common mineral assemblage of granulite facies consists of antiperthitic plagioclase, alkali feldspar containing up to 50% albite and Al_{2}O_{3}-rich pyroxenes.

Transition between amphibolite and granulite facies is defined by these reaction isograds:

amphibole → pyroxene + H_{2}O

biotite → K-feldspar + garnet + orthopyroxene + H_{2}O.

Hornblende granulite subfacies is a transitional coexistence region of anhydrous and hydrated ferromagnesian minerals, so the above-mentioned isograds mark the boundary with pyroxene granulite subfacies – facies with completely anhydrous mineral assemblages.

== 1911 Encyclopædia Britannica definition ==
Granulite (Latin granulum, "a little grain") is a name used by petrographers to designate two distinct classes of rocks. According to the terminology of the French school it signifies a granite in which both kinds of mica (muscovite and biotite) occur, and corresponds to the German Granit, or to the English muscovite biotite granite. This application has not been accepted generally. [This granitic meaning of granulite is now obsolete.] To the German petrologists granulite means a more or less banded fine-grained metamorphic rock, consisting mainly of quartz and feldspar in very small irregular crystals and usually also containing a fair number of minute, rounded, pale-red garnets. Among English and American geologists the term is generally employed in this sense.

The granulites are very closely allied to the gneisses, as they consist of nearly the same minerals, but they are finer-grained, have usually less perfect foliation, are more frequently garnetiferous, and have some special features of microscopic structure. In the rocks of this group the minerals, as seen in a microscopic slide, occur as small rounded grains forming a closely fitted mosaic. The individual crystals never have perfect form, and indeed traces of it are rare. In some granulites they interlock, with irregular borders; in others they have been drawn out and flattened into tapering lenticles by crushing. In most cases they are somewhat rounded with smaller grains between the larger. This is especially true of the quartz and feldspar which are the predominant minerals; mica always appears as flat scales (irregular or rounded but not hexagonal). Both muscovite and biotite may be present and vary considerably in abundance; very commonly they have their flat sides parallel and give the rock a rudimentary schistosity, and they may be aggregated into bands in which case the granulites are indistinguishable from certain varieties of gneiss. The garnets are very generally larger than the above-mentioned ingredients, and easily visible with the eye as pink spots on the broken surfaces of the rock. They usually are filled with enclosed grains of the other minerals.

The feldspar of the granulites is mostly orthoclase or cryptoperthite; microcline, oligoclase and albite are also common. Basic feldspars occur only rarely. Among accessory minerals, in addition to apatite, zircon, and iron oxides, the following may be mentioned: hornblende (not common), riebeckite (rare), epidote and zoisite, calcite, sphene, andalusite, sillimanite, kyanite, hercynite (a green spinel), rutile, orthite and tourmaline. Though occasionally we may find larger grains of feldspar, quartz or epidote, it is more characteristic of these rocks that all the minerals are in small, nearly uniform, imperfectly shaped individuals.

On account of the minuteness with which it has been described and the important controversies on points of theoretical geology which have arisen regarding it, the granulite district of Saxony (in the area of Rosswein and Penig) in Germany may be considered the typical region for rocks of this group. It should be remembered that though granulites are probably the commonest rocks of this country, they are mingled with granites, gneisses, gabbros, amphibolites, mica schists and many other petrographical types. All of these rocks show more-or-less metamorphism either of a thermal character or due to pressure and crushing. The granites pass into gneiss and granulite; the gabbros into flaser gabbro and amphibolite; the slates often contain andalusite or chiastolite, and show transitions to mica schists. At one time these rocks were regarded as Archean gneisses of a special type. Johannes Georg Lehmann propounded the hypothesis that their present state was due principally to crushing acting on them in a solid condition, grinding them down and breaking up their minerals, while the pressure to which they were subjected welded them together into coherent rock. It is now believed, however, that they are comparatively recent and include sedimentary rocks, partly of Palaeozoic age, and intrusive masses which may be nearly massive or may have gneissose, flaser or granulitic structures. These have been developed largely by the injection of semi-consolidated highly viscous intrusions, and the varieties of texture are original or were produced very shortly after the crystallization of the rocks. Meanwhile, however, Lehmanns advocacy of post-consolidation crushing as a factor in the development of granulites has been so successful that the terms granulitization and granulitic structures are widely employed to indicate the results of dynamometamorphism acting on rocks at a period long after their solidification.

The Saxon granulites are apparently for the most part igneous and correspond in composition to granites and porphyries. There are, however, many granulites which undoubtedly were originally sediments (arkoses, grits and sandstones). A large part of the highlands of Scotland consists of paragranulites of this kind, which have received the group name of Moine gneisses.

Along with the typical acid granulites above described, in Saxony, India, Scotland and other countries there occur dark-colored basic granulites (trap granulites). These are fine-grained rocks, not usually banded, nearly black in color with small red spots of garnet. Their essential minerals are pyroxene, plagioclase and garnet: chemically they resemble the gabbros. Green augite and hypersthene form a considerable part of these rocks, they may contain also biotite, hornblende and quartz. Around the garnets there is often a radial grouping of small grains of pyroxene and hornblende in a clear matrix of feldspar: these centric structures are frequent in granulites. The rocks of this group accompany gabbro and serpentine, but the exact conditions under which they are formed and the significance of their structures is not very clearly understood.

== See also ==
- Metamorphic facies
- Metamorphic rocks
- Migmatite and granite origin
- Ultrahigh-temperature metamorphism
