= Pentti Eskola =

Finnish geologist (1883–1964)

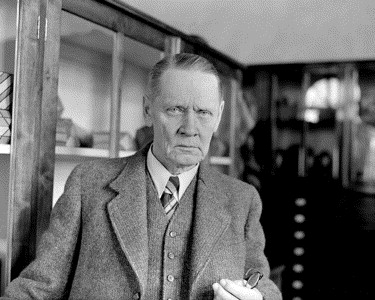
- Born: 8 January 1883; Honkilahti
- Died: 6 December 1964 (aged 81); Helsinki
- Citizenship: Finland
- Education: University of Helsinki
- Known for: Metamorphic facies
- Awards: Penrose Medal (1951); Vetlesen Prize (1964); Wollaston Medal (1958)
- Scientific career
- Fields: Petrology

Pentti Elias Eskola (8 January 1883 – 6 December 1964) was a Finnish geologist who specialised in the petrology of granites and developed the concept of metamorphic facies. He won the Wollaston Medal in 1958, the Vetlesen Prize in 1964, and was given a state funeral upon his death. The mineral eskolaite is named in his honor.

Eskola was born in Lellainen, the son of a farmer. He graduated from the University of Helsinki in 1906 and received a doctorate in 1914 with a dissertation on the petrology of the Orijärvi Region. Eskola was a student of Wilhelm Ramsay. He visited Norway and the US in 1920–21 working at the Geophysical Laboratory in Washington, D.C., and with the Geological Survey of Canada during which time he examined eclogites. He became a geologist for the Finnish Survey in 1922 and joined as a professor of geology at Helsinki in 1924 working there until 1954.

Eskola's major work on metamorphism was influenced by the work of J.J. Sederholm whose work he read when he was just 23. He began to think of the origin and formation of the granites and gneisses and came up with a method to classify the formation under different pressure and temperature conditions resulting in varying chemical equilibria being achieved.

Eskola married in 1914. His wife Mandi Wiiro suffered from a long illness before passing. Their son Matti (1916–1941) predeceased them, as he was killed during World War II on the Russian front and all that was returned to his parents was a purse which contained apple seeds that he collected to plant in their family farm, which Eskola planted in memory of his son.

His daughter Päivätär became a chemistry teacher.

Eskola also discussed philosophy in a book on world outlook and corresponded with philosophers Rolf Arnkil and Sigfrid Sirenius.
