= Index mineral =

Map of index minerals of the Barrovian metamorphic zones of Scotland

An index mineral is used in geology to determine the degree of metamorphism a rock has experienced. Depending on the original composition of and the pressure and temperature experienced by the protolith (parent rock), chemical reactions between minerals in the solid state produce new minerals. When an index mineral is found in a metamorphosed rock, it indicates the minimum pressure and temperature the protolith must have achieved in order for that mineral to form. The higher the pressure and temperature in which the rock formed, the higher the grade of the rock.

The concept traces its roots to 1912, when G. M. Barrow mapped zones of metamorphism in Scotland. Each zone is named for the index mineral that appears in it, for example, the chlorite zone is named for chlorite.

== Mineralogic zones ==
Mudrock, a fine-grained sedimentary rock often containing aluminium-rich minerals, produces these minerals after being metamorphosed, from low to high grade:

- Chlorite zone: quartz, chlorite, muscovite, albite
- Biotite zone: quartz, muscovite, biotite, chlorite, albite
- Garnet zone: quartz, muscovite, biotite, garnet, sodic plagioclase
- Staurolite zone: quartz, muscovite, biotite, garnet, staurolite, plagioclase
- Kyanite zone: quartz, muscovite, biotite, garnet, kyanite, plagioclase, +/- staurolite
- Sillimanite zone: quartz, muscovite, biotite, garnet, sillimanite, plagioclase

== See also ==
- Metamorphic facies
- Metamorphic zone
- Index fossil
