= Kyanite =

Aluminosilicate mineral

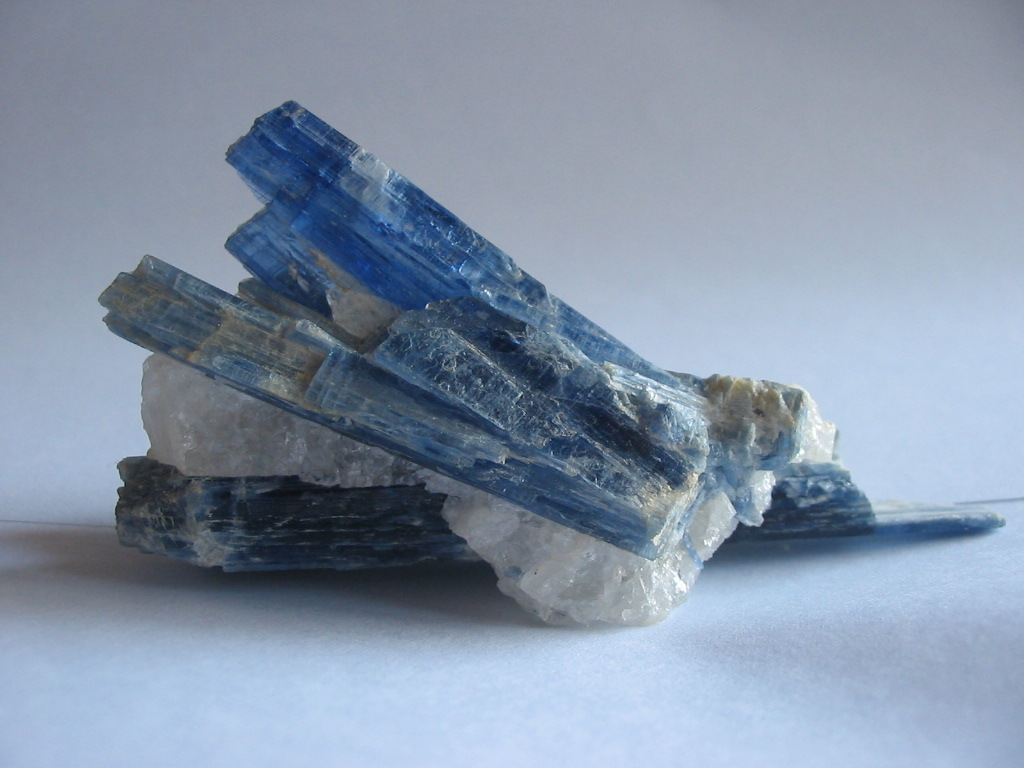

General
- Category: Nesosilicate
- Formula: Al_{2}SiO_{5}
- IMA symbol: Ky
- Strunz classification: 9.AF.15
- Dana classification: 52.02.02c.01
- Crystal system: Triclinic
- Crystal class: Pinacoidal (1̅) (same H-M symbol)
- Space group: P1̅
- Unit cell: a = 7.1262(12) Å b = 7.852(10) Å c = 5.5724(10) Å α = 89.99(2)°, β = 101.11(2)° γ = 106.03(1)°; Z = 4

Identification
- Color: Blue, white, rarely green, light gray to gray, rarely yellow, pink, orange, and black, can be zoned
- Crystal habit: Columnar; fibrous; bladed
- Twinning: Lamellar on {100}
- Cleavage: [100] perfect [010] imperfect with 79° angle between
- Fracture: Splintery
- Tenacity: Brittle
- Mohs scale hardness: 4.5–5 parallel to one axis 6.5–7 perpendicular to that axis
- Luster: Vitreous to white
- Streak: White
- Diaphaneity: Transparent to translucent
- Specific gravity: 3.53–3.65 measured; 3.67 calculated
- Optical properties: Biaxial (-); high relief
- Refractive index: n_{α} = 1.712 – 1.718 n_{β} = 1.720 – 1.725 n_{γ} = 1.727 – 1.734
- Birefringence: δ = 0.012 – 0.016
- Pleochroism: Trichroic, colorless to pale blue to blue
- 2V angle: 78°–83°

Kyanite is a typically blue aluminosilicate mineral, found in aluminium-rich metamorphic pegmatites and sedimentary rock. It is the high pressure polymorph of andalusite and sillimanite, and the presence of kyanite in metamorphic rocks generally indicates metamorphism deep in the Earth's crust. Kyanite is also known as disthene or cyanite.

Kyanite is strongly anisotropic, in that its hardness varies depending on its crystallographic direction. In kyanite, this anisotropism can be considered an identifying characteristic, along with its characteristic blue color. Its name comes from the same origin as that of the color cyan, being derived from the Ancient Greek word κύανος. This is typically rendered into English as kyanos or kuanos and means "dark blue."

Kyanite is used as a raw material in the manufacture of ceramics and abrasives, and it is an important index mineral used by geologists to trace metamorphic zones.

== Properties ==
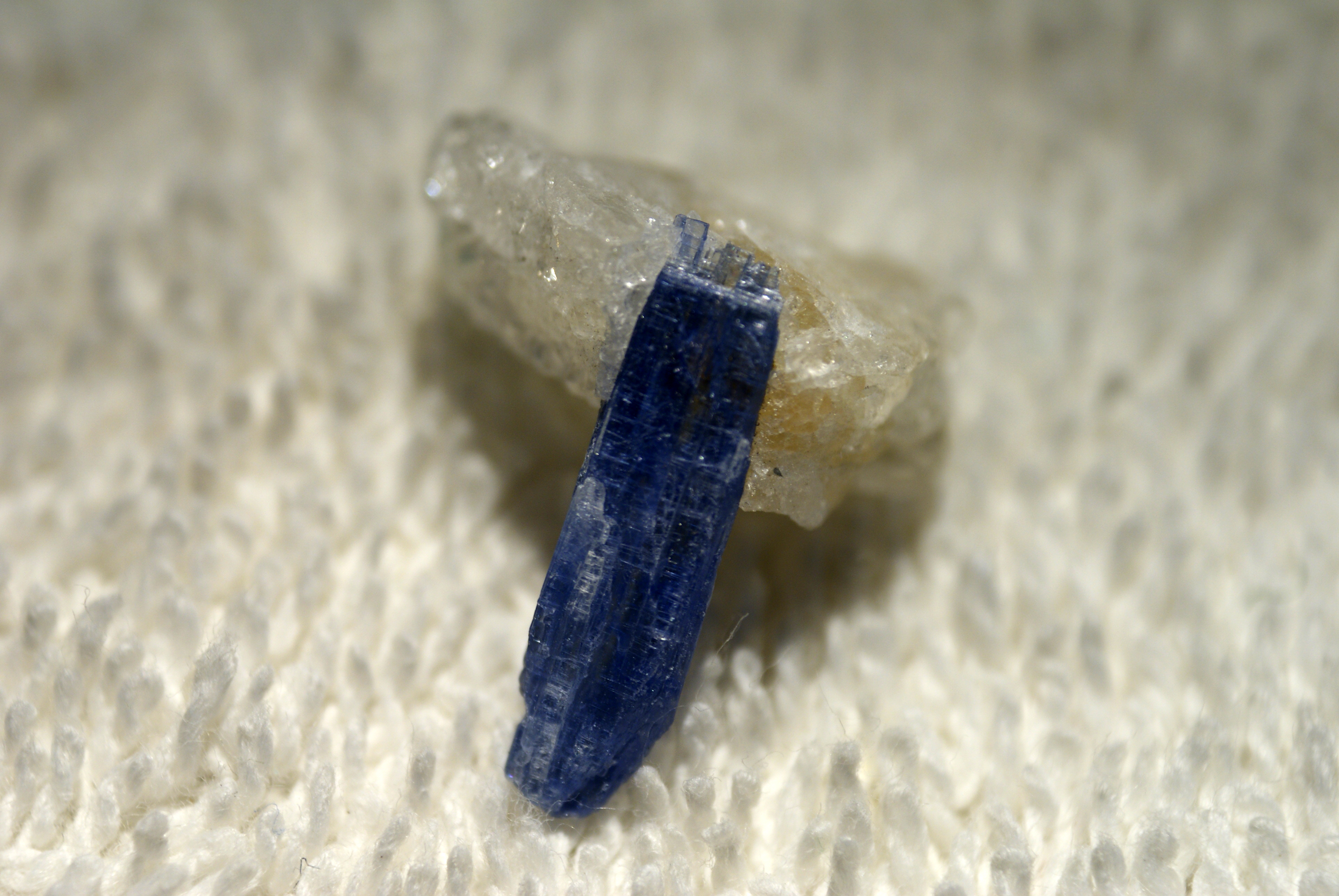
Deep blue kyanite

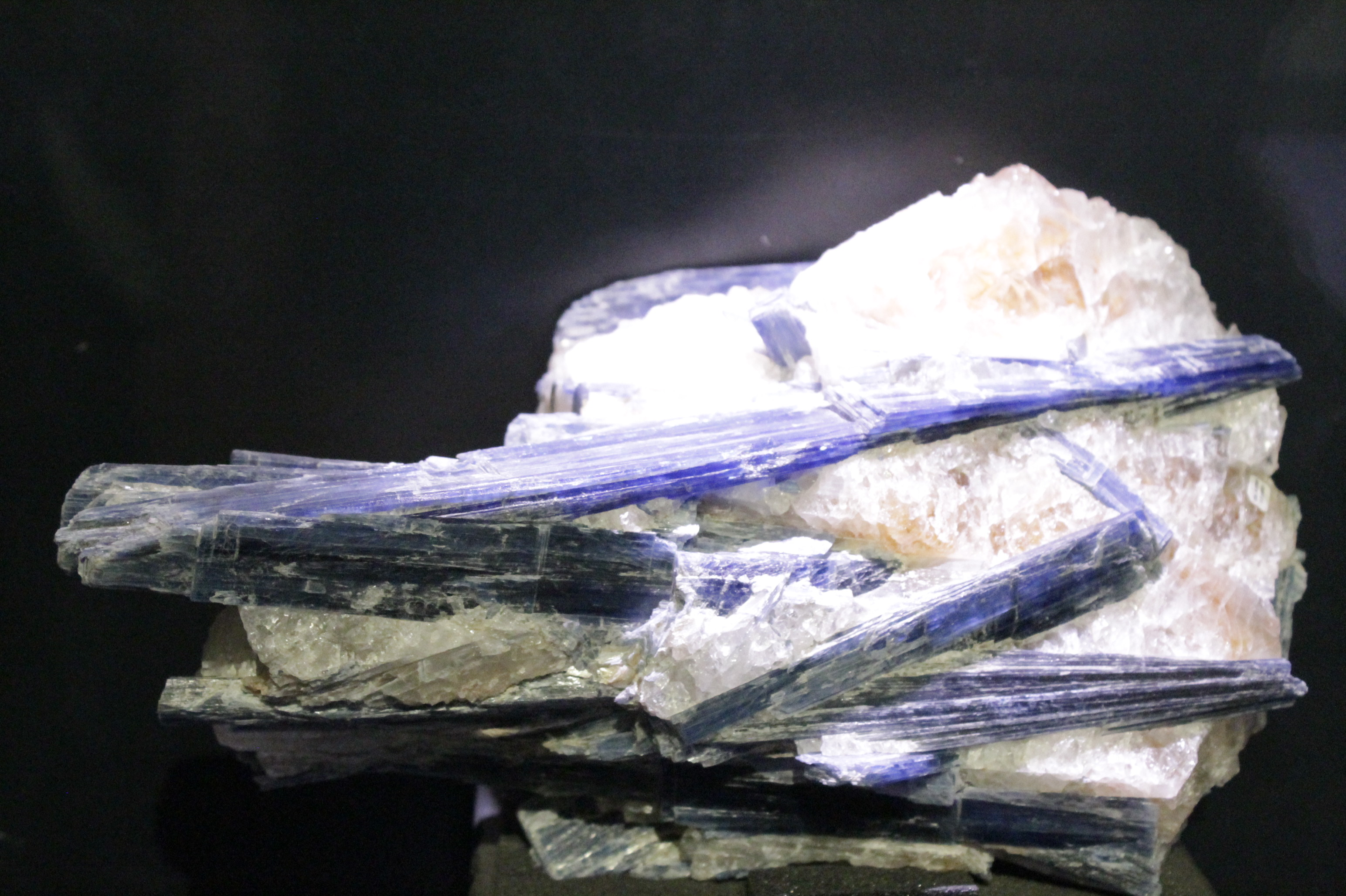
Kyanite within quartz, Hunterian Museum, Glasgow

Kyanite is an aluminum silicate mineral, with the chemical formula Al_{2}SiO_{5}. It is typically patchy blue in color, though it can range from pale to deep blue and can also be gray or white or, infrequently, light green. It typically forms sprays of bladed crystals, but is less commonly found as distinct euhedral (well-shaped) crystals, which are particularly prized by collectors. It has a perfect {100} cleavage plane, parallel to the long axis of the crystal, and a second good cleavage plane {010} that is at an angle of 79 degrees to the {100} cleavage plane. Kyanite also shows a parting on {001} at an angle of about 85 degrees to the long axis of the crystal. Cleavage surfaces typically display a pearly luster. The crystals are slightly flexible.

Kyanite's elongated, columnar crystals are usually a good first indication of the mineral, as well as its color (when the specimen is blue). Associated minerals are useful as well, especially the presence of the polymorphs of staurolite, which occurs frequently with kyanite. However, the most useful characteristic in identifying kyanite is its anisotropism. If one suspects a specimen to be kyanite, verifying that it has two distinctly different hardness values on perpendicular axes is a key to identification; it has a hardness of 5.5 parallel to {001} and 7 parallel to {100}. Thus, a steel needle will easily scratch a kyanite crystal parallel to its long axis, but the crystal is impervious to being scratched by a steel needle perpendicular to the long axis.

=== Structure ===
The kyanite structure can be visualized as a distorted face centered cubic lattice of oxygen ions, with aluminium ions occupying 40% of the octahedral sites and silicon occupying 10% of the tetrahedral sites. The aluminium octahedra form chains along the length of the crystal, half of which are straight and half of which are zigzag, with silica tetrahedra linking the chains together. There is no direct linkage between the silica tetrahedra, making kyanite a member of the nesosilicate class of silicate minerals.

== Occurrence ==
Phase diagram of Al_{2}SiO_{5}
(aluminosilicates).

Kyanite occurs in biotite gneiss, mica schist, and hornfels, which are metamorphic rocks formed at high pressure during regional metamorphism of a protolith which is rich in aluminium (a pelitic protolith). Kyanite is also occasionally found in granite and pegmatites and associated quartz veins, and is infrequently found in eclogites. It occurs as detrital grains in sedimentary rocks, although it tends to weather rapidly. It is associated with staurolite, andalusite, sillimanite, talc, hornblende, gedrite, mullite and corundum.

Kyanite is one of the most common minerals, having the composition Al_{2}SiO_{5}. Minerals with identical compositions but a different, distinct crystal structure are called polymorphs. There are two polymorphs of kyanite: andalusite and sillimanite. Kyanite is the most stable at high pressure, andalusite is the most stable at lower temperature and pressure, and sillimanite is the most stable at higher temperature and lower pressure. They are all equally stable at the triple point near 4.2 kbar and 530 °C (986 °F). This makes the presence of kyanite in a metamorphic rock an indication of metamorphism at high pressure.

Kyanite is often used as an index mineral to define and trace a metamorphic zone that was subject to a particular degree of metamorphism at great depth in the crust. For example, G. M. Barrow defined kyanite zones and sillimanite zones in his pioneering work on the mineralogy of metamorphic rocks. Barrow was characterizing a region of Scotland that had experienced regional metamorphism at depth. By contrast, the metamorphic zones surrounding the Fanad pluton of Ireland, which formed by contact metamorphism at a shallower depth in the crust, include andalusite and sillimanite zones but no kyanite zone.

Kyanite is potentially stable at low temperature and pressure. However, under these conditions, the reactions that produce kyanite, such as:

muscovite + staurolite + quartz → biotite + kyanite + H_{2}O

never take place, and hydrous aluminosilicate minerals such as muscovite, pyrophyllite, or kaolinite are found instead of kyanite.

Bladed crystals of kyanite are very common, but individual euhedral crystals are prized by collectors. Kyanite occurs in Manhattan schist, formed under extreme pressure as a result of a continental collision during the assembly of the supercontinent of Pangaea. It is also found in pegmatites of the Appalachian Mountains and in Minas Gerais, Brazil. Splendid specimens are found at Pizzo Forno in Switzerland.

Kyanite can take on an orange color, which notably occurs in Loliondo, Tanzania. The orange color is due to inclusions of small amounts of manganese (Mn^{3+}) in the structure.

== Uses ==
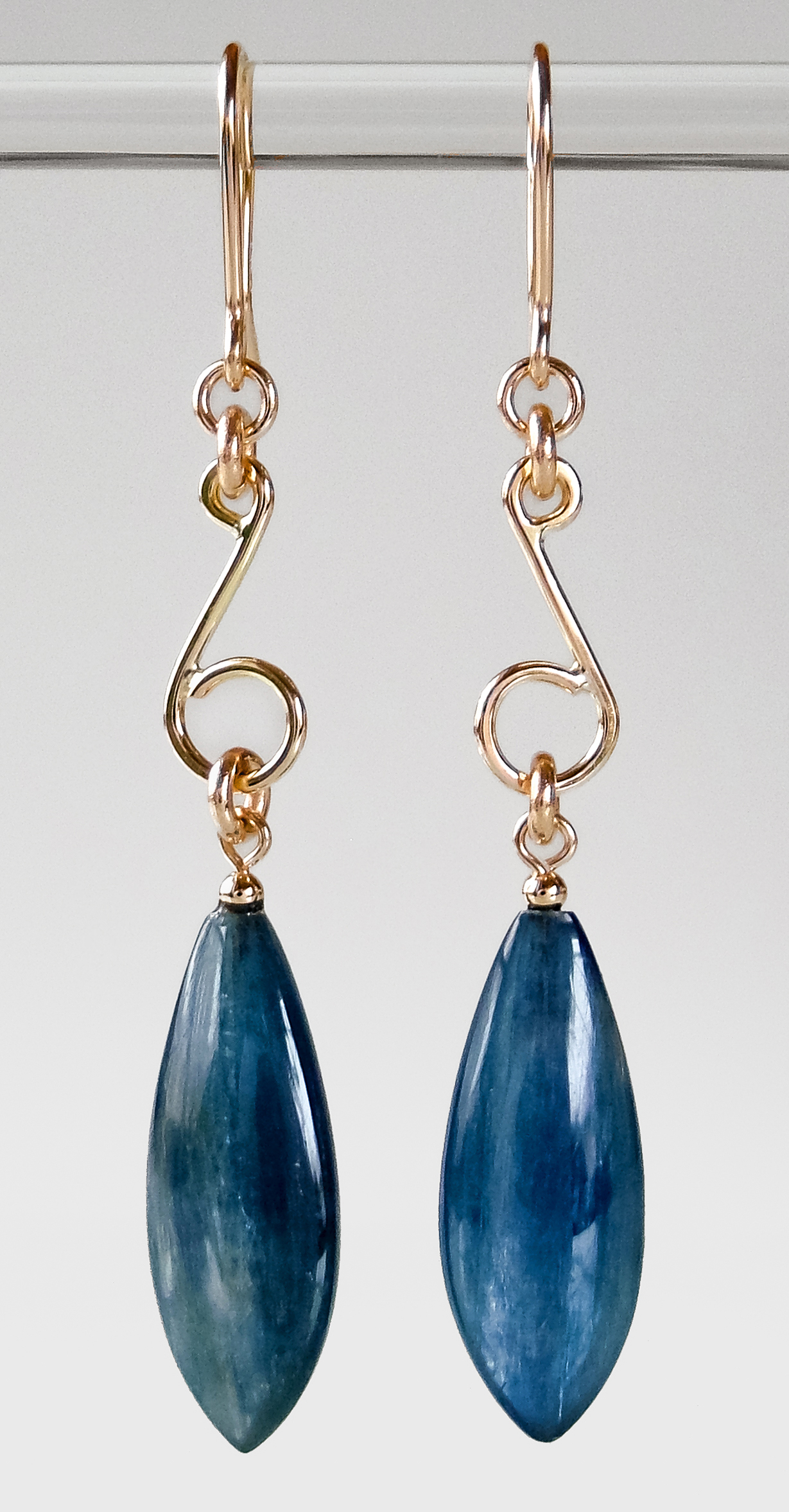
18K gold earrings with drop-shaped kyanites.

Kyanite is used primarily in refractory and ceramic products, including porcelain plumbing and dishware. It is also used in electronics, electrical insulators and abrasives.

At temperatures above 1100 °C, kyanite decomposes into mullite and vitreous silica via the following reaction:

3(Al_{2}O_{3}·SiO_{2}) → 3Al_{2}O_{3}·2SiO_{2} + SiO_{2}

This transformation results in an expansion. Mullitized kyanite is used to manufacture refractory materials.

Kyanite has been used as a semiprecious gemstone, which may display cat's eye chatoyancy, though this effect is limited by its anisotropism and perfect cleavage. Color varieties include orange kyanite from Tanzania. The orange color is due to inclusions of small amounts of manganese (Mn^{3+}) in the structure.
