= Metamorphic facies =

Mineral assemblage in metamorphic rocks

A metamorphic facies is a set of mineral assemblages in metamorphic rocks formed under similar pressures and temperatures. The assemblage is typical of what is formed in conditions corresponding to an area on the two dimensional graph of temperature vs. pressure (See diagram in Figure 1). Rocks which contain certain minerals can therefore be linked to certain tectonic settings, times and places in the geological history of the area. The boundaries between facies (and corresponding areas on the temperature v. pressure graph) are wide because they are gradational and approximate. The area on the graph corresponding to rock formation at the lowest values of temperature and pressure is the range of formation of sedimentary rocks, as opposed to metamorphic rocks, in a process called diagenesis.

Figure 1. Diagram showing metamorphic facies in pressure-temperature space. The domain of the graph corresponds to circumstances within the Earth's crust and upper mantle.

== Historic definition ==
The name facies was first used for specific sedimentary environments in sedimentary rocks by Swiss geologist Amanz Gressly in 1838. Analogous with these sedimentary facies a number of metamorphic facies were proposed in 1920 by Finnish petrologist Pentti Eskola. Eskola's classification was refined by New-Zealand geologist Francis John Turner throughout his career. A classic work of Turner's was the book he published in 1948 titled Mineralogical and Structural Evolution of Metamorphic Rocks. Turner continued to work in the field, refining the metamorphic facies classifications through the end of his career in the early 1970s.

Triangular diagrams showing the aluminium (A), calcium (C) and iron (F) content of the main phases (dark dots) in metamorphic rocks in various facies. Thin grey lines are stable phase equilibria.

Triangular diagrams showing the aluminium (A), iron (F) and magnesium (M) content of the main phases (dark dots and, when the composition can vary, stripes). Thin grey lines represent equilibria between phases.

== Underlying principles ==
The different metamorphic facies are defined by the mineralogical composition of a rock. When the temperature or pressure in a rock body change, the rock can cross into a different facies and some minerals become stable while others become unstable or metastable. Whether minerals really react depends on the reaction kinetics, the activation energy of the reaction and how much fluid is present in the rock.

The minerals in a metamorphic rock and their age relations can be studied by optical microscopy or scanning electron microscopy of thin sections of the rock. Apart from the metamorphic facies of a rock, a whole terrane can be described by the abbreviations LT, MT, HT, LP, MP, HP (from low, medium or high; pressure or temperature). Since the 1980s the term UHP (ultra high pressure) has been used for rocks that experienced extreme pressures.

Which minerals grow in a rock is also dependent upon the original composition of the protolith (the original rock before metamorphosis). Carbonate rocks have a different composition than a basalt lava, the minerals that can grow in them are different too. Therefore, a metapsammite and a metapelite will have different mineralogical compositions even though they are in the same metamorphic facies.

== Index minerals ==
Every metamorphic facies has some index minerals by which it can be recognized. That does not mean these minerals will necessarily be visible with the naked eye, or even exist in the rock; if the rock does not have the right chemical composition, they will not crystallize.

Very typical index minerals are the polymorphs of aluminosilicate (Al_{2}SiO_{5}, all are nesosilicates). Andalusite is stable at low pressure, kyanite is stable at high pressure but relatively low temperature and sillimanite is stable at high temperature.

== Mineral assemblages ==
=== Zeolite facies ===
The zeolite facies is the metamorphic facies with the lowest metamorphic grade. At lower temperature and pressure processes in the rock are called diagenesis. The facies is named for zeolites, strongly hydrated tectosilicates. It can have the following mineral assemblages:

In meta-igneous rocks and greywackes:

- heulandite + analcite + quartz ± clay minerals
- laumontite + albite + quartz ± chlorite

In metapelites:

- muscovite + chlorite + albite + quartz

=== Prehnite-pumpellyite facies ===
The prehnite-pumpellyite facies is a little higher in pressure and temperature than the zeolite facies. It is named for the minerals prehnite (a Ca-Al-phyllosilicate) and pumpellyite (a sorosilicate). The prehnite-pumpellyite is characterized by the mineral assemblages:

In meta-igneous rocks and greywackes:

- prehnite + pumpellyite + chlorite + albite + quartz
- pumpellyite + chlorite + epidote + albite + quartz
- pumpellyite + epidote + stilpnomelane + muscovite + albite + quartz

In metapelites:

- muscovite + chlorite + albite + quartz

=== Greenschist facies ===
The greenschist facies is at low pressure and temperature. The facies is named for the typical schistose texture of the rocks and green colour of the minerals chlorite, epidote and actinolite. Characteristic mineral assemblages are:

In metabasites:

- chlorite + albite + epidote ± actinolite, quartz

In metagreywackes:

- albite + quartz + epidote + muscovite ± stilpnomelane

In metapelites:

- muscovite + chlorite + albite + quartz
- chloritoid + chlorite + muscovite + quartz ± paragonite
- biotite + muscovite + chlorite + albite + quartz + Mn-garnet (spessartine)

In Si-rich dolomite rocks:

- dolomite + quartz

=== Amphibolite facies ===
The amphibolite facies is a facies of medium pressure and average to high temperature. It is named after amphiboles that form under such circumstances. It has the following mineral assemblages:

In metabasites:

- hornblende + plagioclase ± epidote, garnet, cummingtonite, diopside, biotite

In metapelites:

- muscovite + biotite + quartz + plagioclase ± garnet, staurolite, kyanite/sillimanite

In Si-dolostones:

- dolomite + calcite + tremolite ± talc (lower pressure and temperature)
- dolomite + calcite + diopside ± forsterite (higher pressure and temperature)

=== Granulite facies ===
The granulite facies is the highest grade of metamorphism at medium pressure. The depth at which it occurs is not constant. A characteristic mineral for this facies and the pyroxene-hornblende facies is orthopyroxene. The granulite facies is characterized by the following mineral assemblages:

In metabasites:

- orthopyroxene + clinopyroxene + hornblende + plagioclase ± biotite
- orthopyroxene + clinopyroxene + plagioclase ± quartz
- clinopyroxene + plagioclase + garnet ± orthopyroxene (higher pressure)

In metapelites:

- garnet + cordierite + sillimanite + K-feldspar + quartz ± biotite
- sapphirine + orthopyroxene + K-feldspar + quartz ± osumilite (at very high temperature)

=== Blueschist facies ===
The blueschist facies is at relatively low temperature but high pressure, such as occurs in rocks in a subduction zone. The facies is named after the schistose character of the rocks and the blue minerals glaucophane and lawsonite. The blueschist facies forms the following mineral assemblages:

In metabasites:

- glaucophane + lawsonite + chlorite + sphene ± epidote ± phengite ± paragonite, omphacite

In metagreywackes:

- quartz + jadeite + lawsonite ± phengite, glaucophane, chlorite

In metapelites:

- phengite + paragonite + carpholite + chlorite + quartz

In carbonate-rocks (marbles):

- aragonite

=== Eclogite facies ===
The eclogite facies is the facies at the highest pressure and high temperature. It is named for the metabasic rock eclogite. The eclogite facies has the mineral assemblages:

In metabasites:

- omphacite + garnet ± kyanite, quartz, hornblende, zoisite

In metagranodiorite:

- quartz + phengite + jadeite/omphacite + garnet

In metapelites:

- phengite + garnet + kyanite + chloritoid (Mg-rich) + quartz
- phengite + kyanite + talc + quartz ± jadeite

=== Albite-epidote-hornfels facies ===
The albite-epidote-hornfels facies is a facies at low pressure and relatively low temperatures. It is named for the two minerals albite and epidote, though they are also stable in other facies. Hornfels is a rock formed by contact metamorphism, a process that characteristically involves high temperatures but low pressures/depths. This facies is characterized by the following minerals:

In metabasites:

- albite + epidote + actinolite + chlorite + quartz

In metapelites:

- muscovite + biotite + chlorite + quartz

In calcaerous assemblage: Calcite + talc + quartz

=== Hornblende-hornfels facies ===
The hornblende-hornfels facies is a facies with the same low pressures but slightly higher temperatures as the albite-epidote facies. Though it is named for the mineral hornblende, the appearance of that mineral is not constrained to this facies. The hornblende-hornfels facies has the following mineral assemblages:

In metabasites:

- hornblende + plagioclase ± diopside, anthophyllite/cummingtonite, quartz

In metapelites:

- muscovite + biotite + andalusite + cordierite + quartz + plagioclase

In K_{2}O-poor sediments or meta-igneous rocks:

- cordierite + anthophyllite + biotite + plagioclase + quartz

In Si-rich dolostones:

- dolomite + calcite + tremolite ± talc

=== Pyroxene-hornfels facies ===
The pyroxene-hornfels facies is the contact-metamorphic facies with the highest temperatures and is, like the granulite facies, characterized by the mineral orthopyroxene. It is characterized by the following mineral assemblages:

In metabasites:

- orthopyroxene + clinopyroxene + plagioclase ± olivine or quartz

In metapelites:

- cordierite + quartz + sillimanite + K-feldspar (orthoclase) ± biotite ± garnet

(If the temperature is below 750 °C there will be andalusite instead of sillimanite)

- cordierite + orthopyroxene + plagioclase ± garnet, spinel

In carbonate rocks:

- calcite + forsterite ± diopside, periclase
- diopside + grossular + wollastonite ± vesuvianite

=== Sanidinite facies ===
The sanidinite facies is a rare facies of extremely high temperatures and low pressure. It can only be reached under certain contact-metamorphic circumstances. Due to the high temperature the rock experiences partial melting and glass is formed. This facies is named for the mineral sanidine. It is characterized by the following mineral assemblages:

In metapelites:

- cordierite + mullite + sanidine + tridymite (often altered to quartz) + glass

In carbonates:

- wollastonite + anorthite + diopside
- monticellite + melilite ± calcite, diopside (also tilleyite, spurrite, merwinite, larnite and other rare Ca- or Ca-Mg-silicates).

== Tectonic setting ==
Ecologites and blueschists are associated with subduction zones. Granulites are associated with volcanic arcs.

== See also ==
- Metamorphic series
- Metamorphism
- Petrogenetic grid
