= Sillimanite =

Nesosilicate mineral

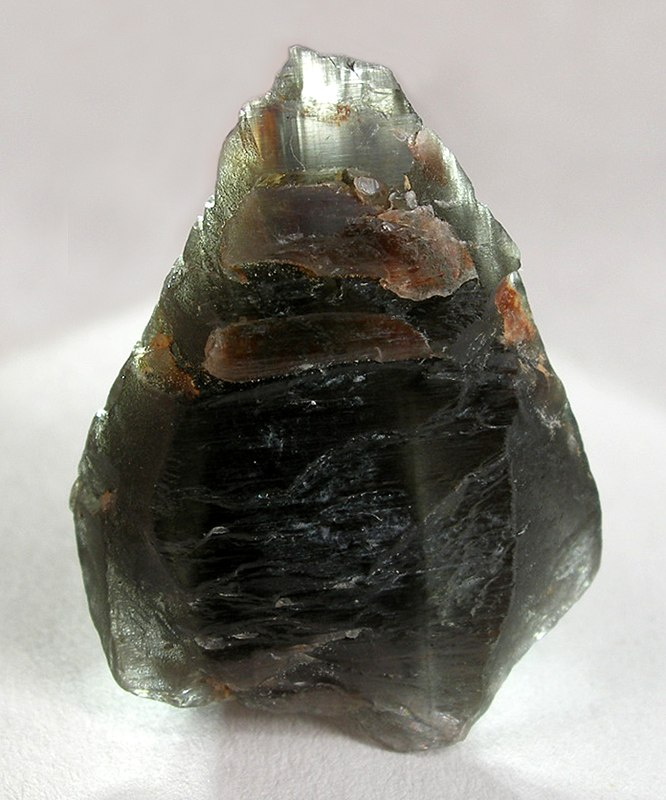

General
- Category: Nesosilicate
- Formula: Al_{2}SiO_{5}
- IMA symbol: Sil
- Strunz classification: 9.AF.05
- Dana classification: 52.02.02a.01
- Crystal system: Orthorhombic
- Crystal class: Dipyramidal (mmm); H-M symbol: (2/m 2/m 2/m)
- Space group: Pbnm
- Unit cell: a = 7.47 Å, b = 7.66 Å c = 5.75 Å; Z = 4

Identification
- Color: Colourless or white to grey, also brown, yellow, yellow-green, grey-green, blue-green, blue; colourless in thin section
- Crystal habit: Prismatic crystals, fibrous, acicular
- Cleavage: {010} perfect
- Fracture: Splintery
- Tenacity: Tough
- Mohs scale hardness: 7
- Luster: Vitreous to subadamantine, silky
- Streak: White
- Diaphaneity: Transparent to translucent
- Specific gravity: 3.24
- Optical properties: Biaxial (+)
- Refractive index: n_{α} = 1.653 – 1.661 n_{β} = 1.654 – 1.670 n_{γ} = 1.669 – 1.684
- Birefringence: δ = 0.020 – 0.022
- Pleochroism: Colourless to pale brown to yellow
- 2V angle: 21–30°

Phase diagram of Al_{2}SiO_{5}
(aluminosilicates).

Sillimanite or fibrolite is an aluminosilicate mineral with the chemical formula Al_{2}SiO_{5}. Sillimanite is named after the American chemist Benjamin Silliman (1779–1864). It was first described in 1824 for an occurrence in Chester, Connecticut.

== Occurrence ==
Sillimanite or fibrolite is one of three aluminosilicate polymorphs, the other two being andalusite and kyanite. A common variety of sillimanite is known as fibrolite, so named because the mineral appears like a bunch of fibres twisted together when viewed in thin section or even by the naked eye. Both the fibrous and traditional forms of sillimanite are common in metamorphosed sedimentary rocks. It is an index mineral indicating high temperature but variable pressure. Example rocks include gneiss and granulite. It occurs with andalusite, kyanite, potassium feldspar, almandine, cordierite, biotite and quartz in schist, gneiss, hornfels and also rarely in pegmatites. Dumortierite and mullite are similar mineral species found in porcelain.

Sillimanite has been found in Brandywine Springs, New Castle County, Delaware. It was named by the State Legislature in 1977 as the state mineral of Delaware by the suggestion of the Delaware Mineralogical Society.

== Uses ==
Natural sillimanite is used in the manufacture of high alumina refractories or 55–60% alumina bricks. However, it has mostly been replaced by the other aluminosilicate polymorphs, andalusite and kyanite, for this purpose. As of 1998, sillimanite was just 2% of all aluminosilicate mineral production in the western world.

== Gallery ==
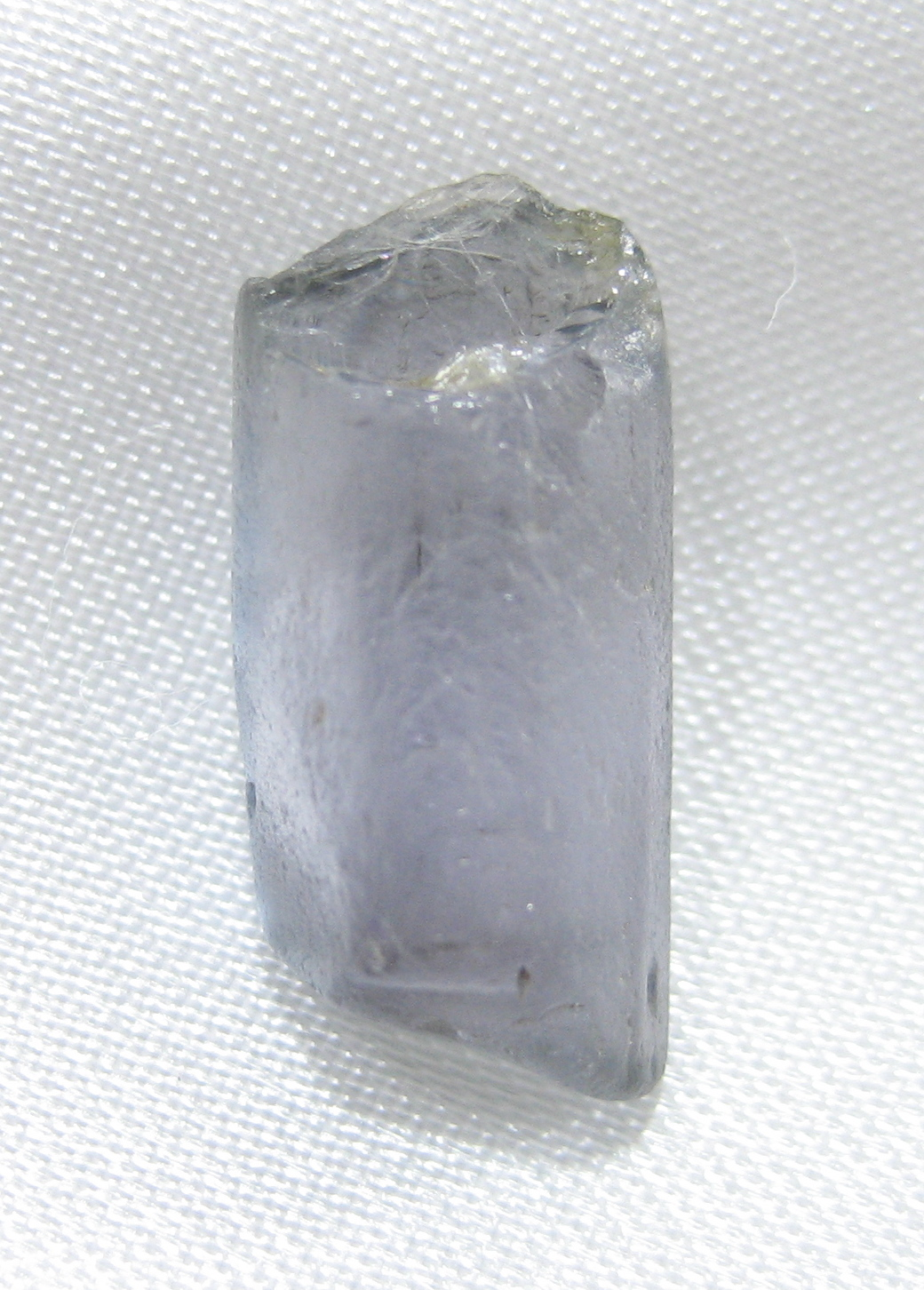
Silimanite crystal from Sri Lanka

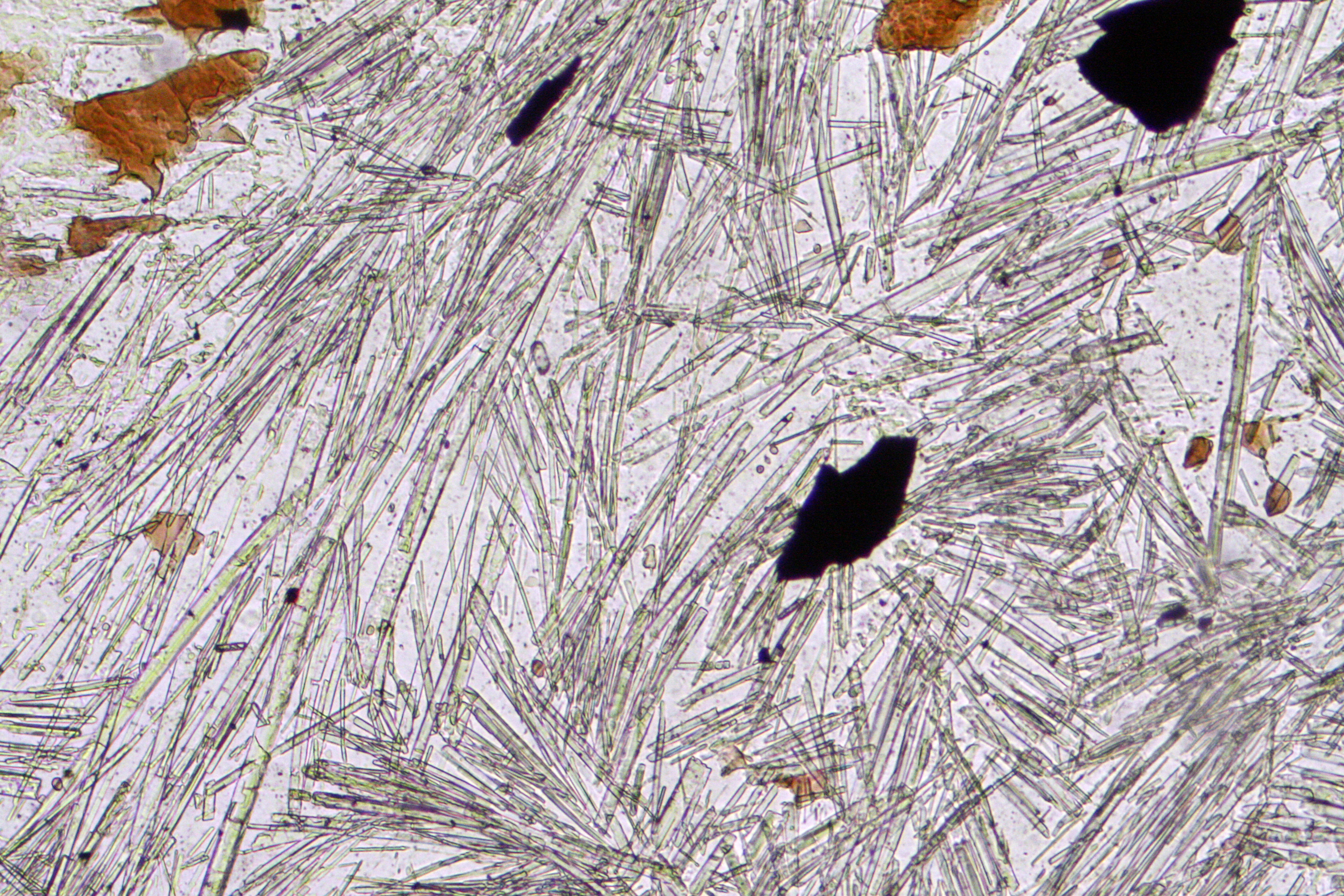
Fibrolite micrograph

== See also ==
- List of minerals
- List of minerals named after people
- Asbestos cement, which is also called "fibrolite"
