= Compatibility diagram =

Depicts coexisting mineral phases in a metamorphic rock

ACF compatibility diagrams (aluminium-calcium-iron) showing phase equilibria in metamorphic mafic rocks at different P-T circumstances (metamorphic facies). Dots represent mineral phases, thin grey lines are equilibria between two phases. Mineral abbreviations: act = actinolite; cc = calcite; chl = chlorite; di = diopside; ep = epidote; glau = glaucophane; gt = garnet; hbl = hornblende; ky = kyanite; law = lawsonite; plag = plagioclase; om = omphacite; opx = orthopyroxene; zo = zoisite

In metamorphic geology, a compatibility diagram shows how the mineral assemblage of a metamorphic rock in thermodynamic equilibrium varies with composition at a fixed temperature and pressure. Compatibility diagrams provide an excellent way to analyze how variations in the rock's composition affect the mineral paragenesis that develops in a rock at particular pressure and temperature conditions. Because of the difficulty of depicting more than three components (as a ternary diagram), usually only the three most important components are plotted, though occasionally a compatibility diagram for four components is plotted as a projected tetrahedron.

== Construction ==
A three-component compatibility diagram will depict the stable phase of each pure component as the point at each corner of a ternary diagram. Additional points in the diagram represent other pure phases, and lines connecting pairs of these points represent compositions at which the two phases are the only phases present. These lines generally divide the diagram into subtriangles since, in accordance with Gibb's phase rule, a system of three components will contain three phases except at the degenerate compositions represented by the points and lines. The composition within each subtriangle will be a mixture of the pure phases found at the corners of the subtriangle. These are the compatible phases for the composition at the temperature and pressure (and, sometimes, degree of water saturation) for which the diagram is prepared.

== Common types ==
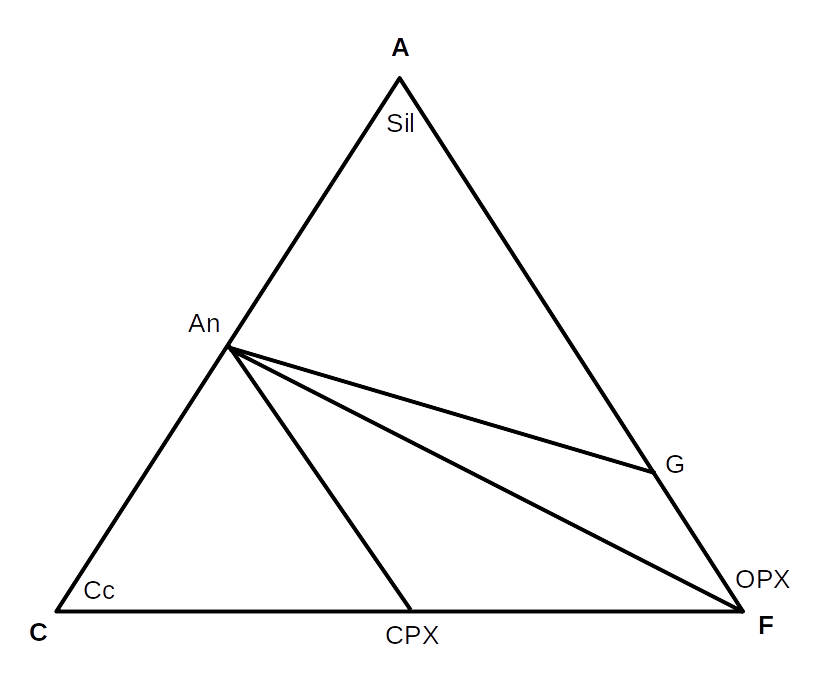
ACF compatibility diagram depicting compatible phases of the granulite facies. Cc=calcite; Sil=sillimanite; OPC=orthopyroxene; CPX=clinopyroxene; An=anorthite; G=garnet

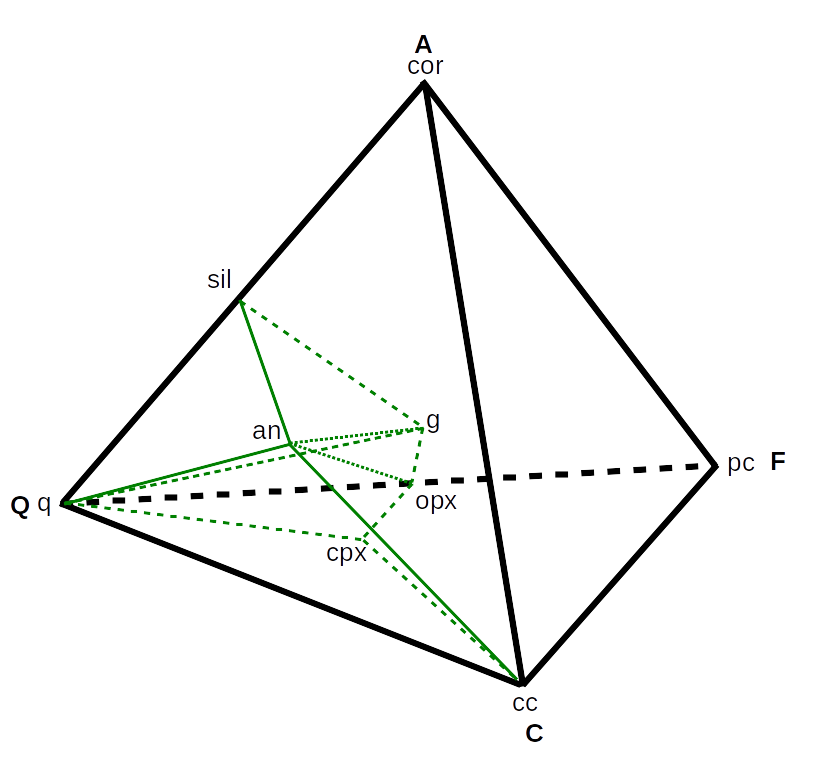
ACFQ compatibility diagram for granulite facies. Symbols in addition to those of the previous diagram are Q=SiO_{2}, q=quartz, cor=corundum, pc=periclase. Most silica-undersaturated phases, such as olivine or spinel, have been omitted. The previous diagram is the projection of the silica-rich corner of this diagram onto the ACF face.

Certain choices of components have proven particularly useful in metamorphic petrology.

=== ACF diagram ===
An ACF diagram is particularly suitable for describing basaltic metamorphic rocks. Its components are:

A = Al_{2}O_{3} + Fe_{2}O_{3} - (Na_{2}O + K_{2}O)
C = CaO
F = FeO + MgO + MnO

That is, the components are various combinations of the mol% of important metal oxides in the rock. If the rock is assumed to be saturated with quartz and carbon dioxide (though not depicted in the diagram), then at elevated temperature (granulite facies), the corner phases are calcite, sillimanite, and orthopyroxene. The side of the diagram between calcite and sillimanite has a point added for anorthite (calcium feldspar), corresponding to an equal mixture (by mole percentage) of the two components. This forms pure anorthite. Likewise, points are added for clinopyroxene and garnet and the diagram is divided into subtriangles, as depicted in the accompanying diagram.

=== AKF diagram ===
The AKF diagram is intended for rocks containing excess aluminium and silica. Its components are:

A = Al_{2}O_{3} - (CaO + Na_{2}O + K_{2}O)
K = K_{2}O
F = FeO + MgO + MnO

This diagram is less useful, because magnesium does not freely substitute for ferrous iron in many metamorphic minerals important in aluminium-rich rock. These are better regarded as separate components, producing a tetrahedral compatibility diagram.

== See also ==
- Petrogenetic grid – Pressure-temperature diagram of mineral stability ranges
