= Scandiobabingtonite =

General
- Category: Inosilicate
- Formula: Ca_{2}(Fe^{2+}, Mn)ScSi_{5}O_{14}(OH)
- IMA symbol: Sbab
- Strunz classification: 9.DK.05
- Crystal system: Triclinic
- Crystal class: Pinacoidal (1̅) (same H-M symbol)
- Space group: P1̅
- Unit cell: a = 7.536 Å, b = 11.734 Å c = 6.748 Å; α=91.70° β=93.86°, γ=104.53°; Z = 2

Identification
- Color: Colorless, pale grey-green
- Crystal habit: Prismatic crystals
- Cleavage: Perfect on {001} and {1-10}
- Tenacity: Brittle
- Mohs scale hardness: 6
- Luster: Vitreous
- Diaphaneity: Transparent
- Density: 3.24 g/cm^{3}
- Optical properties: biaxial positive
- Refractive index: n_{α}= 1.686 n_{β}= 1.694 n_{γ}= 1.709
- Birefringence: δ=0.023
- Pleochroism: Strong with colors pink(γ') to green(α')
- Dispersion: r > v strong

Scandiobabingtonite was first discovered in the Montecatini granite quarry near Baveno, Italy in a pegmatite cavity. Though found in pegmatites, the crystals of scandiobabingtonite are sub-millimeter sized, and are tabular shaped. Scandiobabingtonite was the sixth naturally occurring mineral discovered with the rare earth element scandium, and grows around babingtonite, with which it is isostructural, hence the namesake. It is also referred to as scandian babingtonite. The ideal chemical formula for scandiobabingtonite is Ca_{2}(Fe^{2+},Mn)ScSi_{5}O_{14}(OH).

== Occurrence ==
Scandiobabingtonite is found in association with orthoclase, quartz, light blue albite, stilbite, fluorite, and mica. When found with these minerals, the scandiobabingtonite crystals are emplanted on the surface of the other minerals. It also occurs as growth around green-black prismatic crystals of babingtonite. The samples of scandiobabingtonite that have been discovered have shown that they start out growing from a seed of babingtonite crystal. This is how scandiobabingtonite gets its chemical structure. The starting seed of babingtonite is still present in the center of the resulting crystal and can be detected with optical and chemical studies. Scandiobabingtonite is a uniquely rare mineral, as it occurs in very small amounts in few locations around the world. It is one of thirteen naturally occurring minerals where scandium is a dominant member. The other scandium minerals are bazzite, cascandite, hetftetjernite, jervisite, juonniite, kolbeckite, kristiansenite, magbasite, oftedalite, pretulite, thortveitite, and titanowodginite. Scandium can also concentrate in other minerals, such as in ferromagnesian minerals, aluminum phosphate minerals, meteoric minerals, and other minerals containing rare earth elements, but it occurs in trace amounts.

== Physical properties ==
Scandiobabingtonite is a colorless or lightly gray-green colored transparent mineral with a glassy or vitreous luster. It exhibits a hardness of 6 on the Mohs hardness scale. Scandiobabingtonite occurs as short, prismatic crystals that are slightly elongated on the [001] axis which gives it a tabular or platy shape. Its crystals are characterized by the {010}, {001}, {110}, {1-10}, and {101} faces. Scandiobabingtonite is brittle and shows perfect cleavage along the {001} and {1-10} planes. The measured density is 3.24 g/cm^{3}.

== Optical properties ==
Scandiobabingtonite is biaxial positive, which means it will refract light along two axes. It exhibits a 2V_{(measured)}=64(2)°, strong dispersion with r>v, and displays strong pleochroism with colors ranging from pink (γ') to green(α'). The extinction angle along the (110) is 6°. Z:Φ=-250°, ρ=47°; Y:Φ=146°, ρ=75°; X:Φ=42°, ρ=47°.

== Chemical properties ==
Scandiobabingtonite is isostructural with babingtonite, and has the same chemical properties as well. It is an inosilicate with 5-periodic single chains. Scandium replaces the Fe^{3+} in babingtonite in six-fold coordination. The empirical chemical formula for scandiobabingtonite is (Ca_{1.71},Na_{0.25})_{Σ0.97}(Fe^{2+}_{0.65},Mn_{0.32})_{Σ0.97}(Sc_{0.91},Sn_{0.04},Fe^{3+}_{0.03})_{Σ0.98}Si_{5.09}O_{14.00}(OH)_{1.00}. Simplified, the formula is Ca_{2}(Fe^{2+},Mn)ScSi_{5}O_{14}(OH)

== Chemical composition ==
Oxide	wt%	Range
SiO_{2}	55.26	54.61-55.62
SnO_{2}	1.21	1.09-1.34
Sc_{2}O_{3}	11.32	11.01-11.51
FeO	8.48	-
Fe_{2}O_{3}	0.5	-
CaO	17.33	17.14-17.69
MnO	4.11	3.43-5.18
Na_{2}O	1.40	1.37-1.43
H_{2}O	1.63	-
Total	101.24	-

== X-ray crystallography ==
Scandiobabingtonite is in the triclinic crystal system, with space group P1. The unit cell dimensions are a=7.536(2) Å, b=11.734(2) Å, c=6.748(2) Å, α=91.70(2)°, β=93.86(2)°, γ=104.53(2)°. These dimensions are almost identical to those of babingtonite. The difference in dimensions is caused by the replacement of iron with scandium in the Fe^{3+}-centered octahedra. The Fe^{3+}-O distance measures as 2.048 Å, while the Sc-O distance is 2.092 Å. This equates to a slightly larger octahedra in scandiobabingtonite than babingtonite.

== See also ==
- List of minerals
