= Epidote group =

Sorosilicate mineral

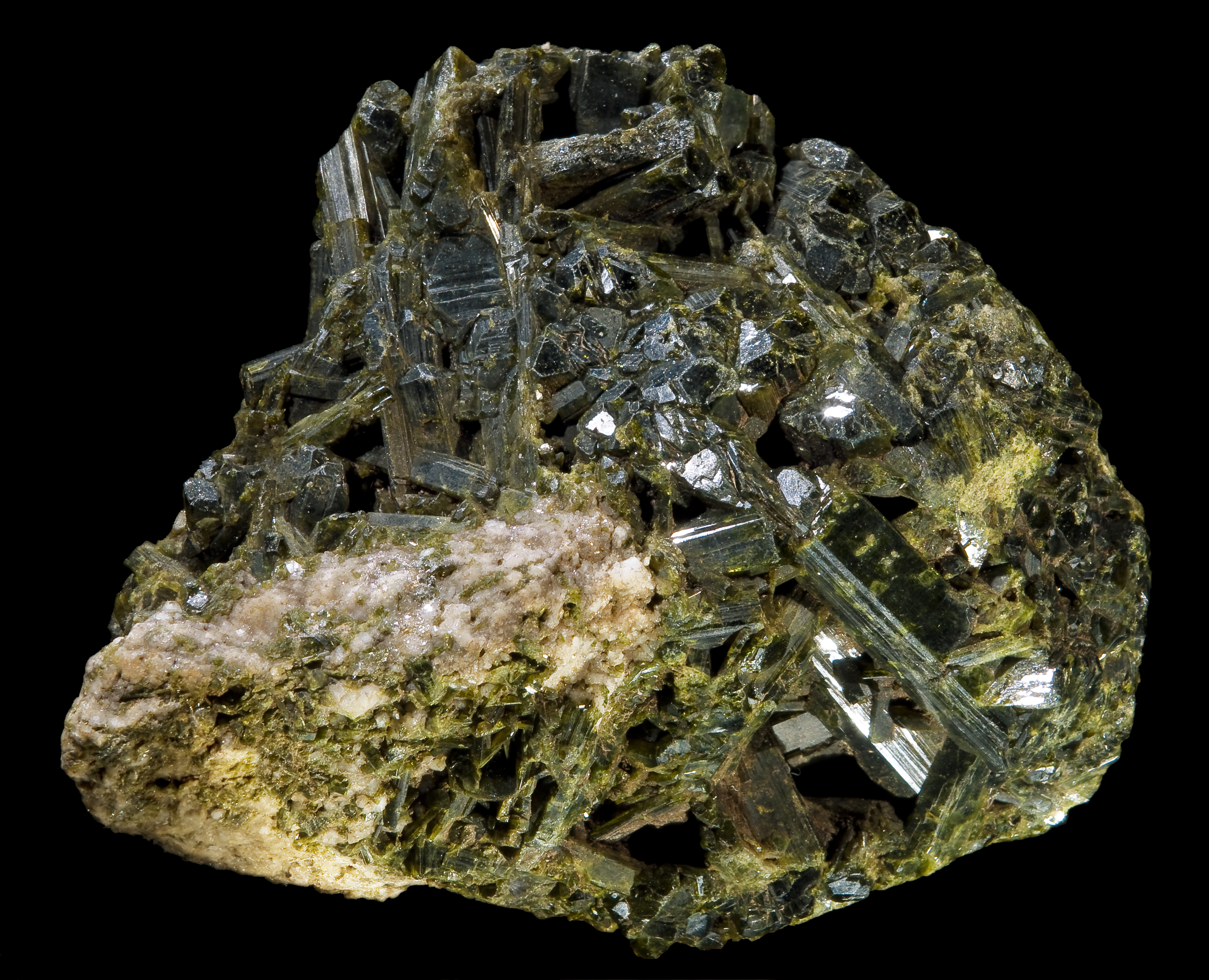

General
- Category: Sorosilicates
- Formula: (A^{2+}_{1}A^{2+}_{2})(M^{3+}_{1}M^{3+}_{2}M^{3+}_{3})O[Si_{2}O_{7}][SiO_{4}](OH)
- IMA symbol: Ep
- Crystal system: Monoclinic
- Crystal class: Prismatic (2/m) (same H–M symbol)
- Space group: P2_{1}/m

Identification
- Color: Yellow-green, pistachio green, greenish black, brownish-green, green, black
- Crystal habit: Prismatic, fibrous, druse/encrustation, massive
- Twinning: On [100]
- Cleavage: {001} perfect and {100} imperfect
- Mohs scale hardness: 6–7
- Luster: Vitreous

Epidotes are a group of sorosilicate minerals that are common in igneous and metamorphic rocks.

== Epidote member species ==
- Clinozoisite, (CaCa)(AlAlAl)O[Si_{2}O_{7}][SiO_{4}](OH)
- Epidote, (CaCa)(AlAlFe^{3+})O[Si_{2}O_{7}][SiO_{4}](OH)
- Epidote-(Sr), (CaSr)(AlAlFe^{3+})O[Si_{2}O_{7}][SiO_{4}](OH)
- Hancockite, (CaPb)(AlAlFe^{3+})O[Si_{2}O_{7}][SiO_{4}](OH)
- Heflikite, (CaCa)(AlAlSc)O[Si_{2}O_{7}][SiO_{4}](OH)
- Mukhinite, (CaCa)(AlAlV^{3+})O[Si_{2}O_{7}][SiO_{4}](OH)
- Niigataite, (CaSr)(AlAlAl)O[Si_{2}O_{7}][SiO_{4}](OH)
- Piemontite, (CaCa)(AlAlMn^{3+})O[Si_{2}O_{7}][SiO_{4}](OH)
- Piemontite-(Pb), (CaPb)(AlAlMn^{3+})O[Si_{2}O_{7}][SiO_{4}](OH)
- Piemontite-(Sr), (CaSr)(AlAlMn^{3+})O[Si_{2}O_{7}][SiO_{4}](OH)
- Tweddillite, (CaSr)(Mn^{3+}AlMn^{3+})O[Si_{2}O_{7}][SiO_{4}](OH)
