= Bavenite =

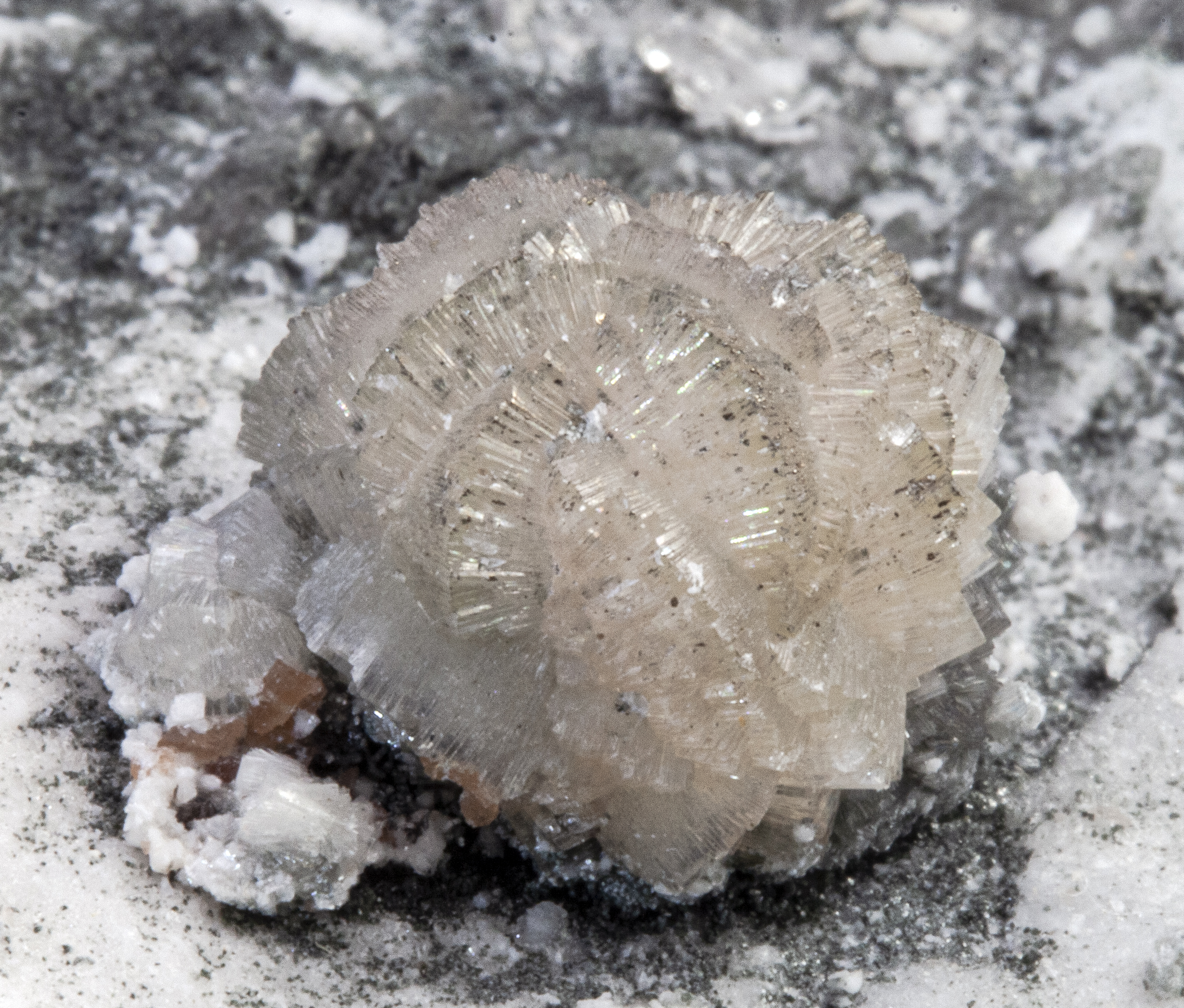
- Bavenite. Aggregate of lamellar crystals, with pyrite microcrystals on them.Cadalso de los Vidrios (Madrid), Spain. 13 mm

General
- Category: Minerals
- Formula: Ca_{4}Be_{2}Al_{2}Si_{9}O_{26}(OH)_{2}
- IMA symbol: Bvn
- Strunz classification: 9.DF.25
- Dana classification: 70.5.3.1
- Crystal system: Orthorhombic
- Crystal class: Pyramidal; H-M Symbol: mm2
- Space group: Am2a
- Unit cell: 2,250.52

Identification
- Color: White, Green, Pink, Brown
- Cleavage: Perfect on {001} Fair on {100}
- Fracture: Uneven
- Mohs scale hardness: 5.5
- Luster: Vitreous - Pearly
- Streak: White
- Diaphaneity: Transparent to translucent
- Density: 2.7
- Optical properties: Biaxial (+)
- Refractive index: n_{α} = 1.578 - 1.586 n_{β} = 1.579 - 1.586 n_{γ} = 1.583 - 1.593
- Birefringence: 0.005 - 0.007
- 2V angle: 22° - 60°
- Dispersion: Moderate r < v
- Ultraviolet fluorescence: None
- Solubility: Unsoluble in acids

Bavenite is a calcium beryllium aluminosilicate, and it is a part of the Bavenite-Bohseite series. Its name originates from its type locality, which is Baveno, Italy. This mineral is approved by the IMA, and got grandfathered, meaning it is still believed to refer to a valid mineral species. It was discovered in 1901 in a pink granite mined in Lago Maggiore. When bavenite was discovered, it was considered as a member of the zeolite series. Later it was removed from the series as unlike zeolites, bavenite loses the water stored in its crystal lattice in a way higher temperature, between 210 and 320 °C. It is a cheap mineral considering its rarity.

== Properties ==
Bavenite mainly consists of oxygen (48.11%), silicon (27.75%) and calcium (17.65%), and otherwise contains aluminum (3.48%), beryllium (2.81%) and hydrogen (0.22%). This mineral is weakly piezoelectric, and is not radioactive. It is a lamellar mineral, meaning it grows in layers that part into thin sheets. However, it is massive, meaning it is shapeless, so singular crystals can't be distinguished. It can also appear in radial aggregates, meaning it has a center from which crystals radiate without producing a stellar form. Crystals that grow in radial aggregates are separated and have different lengths generally. In this case, crystal needles can grow from 1 mm to a few cms in size. It also appears as felted masses. Bavenite can be determined only with the help of infrared or x-ray. It is white usually, but other color variants can occur as well. Due to the variation of the chemical composition of bavenite, different substitution mechanisms had been brought up. However, Canille managed to solve its structure thanks to Berry, who suggested direct Be ⇌ Al with electroneutrality. The T(3) site is occupied by Si and Be, and Be and Al were assigned to the T(2) and T(4) tetrahedra. Cannillo also proposed additional minor Be to replace Al at T(4).

== Environment ==
Bavenite is usually associated with beryl, phenakite, bertrandite, quartz, epidote, stibnite, albite, orthoclase, titanite, clinozoisite and tremolite. Although it was discovered in igneous rocks, later it was found in pegmatites as well. Bavenite can also occur in the Alps, where it was created as a product of the hydrothermal weathering of beryllyium-bearing minerals (mostly beryl) through metamorphism. In the latter case, the mineral occurs with zeolite and prehnite. It can also form by low-temperature alteration of beryl and beryllium-bearing minerals, and generally forms in more alkali environments. It can occur on quartz and feldspar in miarolitic pegmatites as a coating. It also occurs as a pseudomorph of beryl. There's a known case of it occurring from pneumatolytically altered syenites, where it grew into singular crystals on albite, up to 1.5 cms of size per crystal. The mineral was not pseudomorphic in this case.

It is known in around 300 locations worldwide, with more than half located in the Alps. The specimens from the Baveno quarries, the typical locality, are notable. In Spain, very high-quality specimens, relevant on a global scale, have been found in miarolitic cavities in the granite of several quarries in Cadalso de los Vidrios (Madrid). In the quarries of La Cabrera (Madrid), it appears as cottony-looking aggregates formed by capillary crystals.
