= Thulite =

Mineral

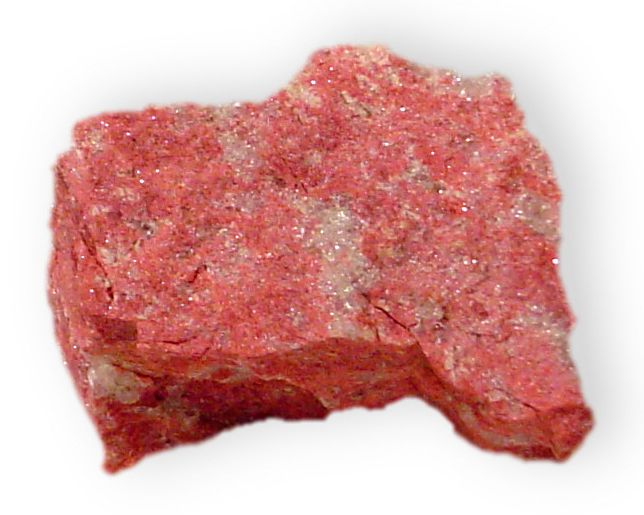
- Thulite from Leksvik, Norway.

General
- Category: Sorosilicate variety
- Formula: (Ca,Mn)_{2}Al_{3}(SiO_{4})(Si_{2}O_{7})O(OH)
- Crystal system: Orthorhombic

Identification
- Color: Pink
- Crystal habit: Massive
- Cleavage: Perfect {010} imperfect {100}
- Fracture: Uneven to conchoidal
- Mohs scale hardness: 6.5
- Luster: Vitreous, pearly on cleavage surfaces
- Streak: White or colorless
- Specific gravity: 3.10–3.38
- Optical properties: biaxial positive
- Refractive index: 1.69–1.70
- Birefringence: 0.006–0.018
- Pleochroism: Present, dichroism or trichroism depending on color.

Thulite (sometimes called rosaline) is a translucent, crystalline or massive pink manganese-bearing variety of the mineral zoisite. Manganese substitutes for calcium in the structure with up to two percent Mn^{2+}. Thulite is often mottled with white calcite and occurs as veins and fracture fillings transecting many types of rock. In mineralogical literature, thulite may sometimes refer to any pink zoisite. Clinothulite is the manganese bearing variety of monoclinic clinozoisite.

Thulite was first discovered at a place called Sauland in Telemark county, Norway in 1820. It is named after the mythical island of Thule in the belief that the island is Scandinavia. Thulite is used as a gemstone and carving material in the manufacture of jewelry and ornamental objects.

Thulite is also found in the Austrian Tyrol and in Mitchell County, North Carolina. A new, more recent find of a small quantity of thulite was discovered near Riverside in Okanogan County, Washington, US and in Snillfjord Municipality in Trøndelag county, Norway during tunnel constructions in December 2018. Thulite is also found in New Zealand in the Otago region of the South Island.

Thulite is also found in Namibia. The occurrence is spread throughout the Namib Desert and generally has ridges with a NE to SW setting. The color can be highly variable with most deposits being greenish in nature, but on occasion the desirable pink color is to be found.
