= Bazzite =

Blue mineral

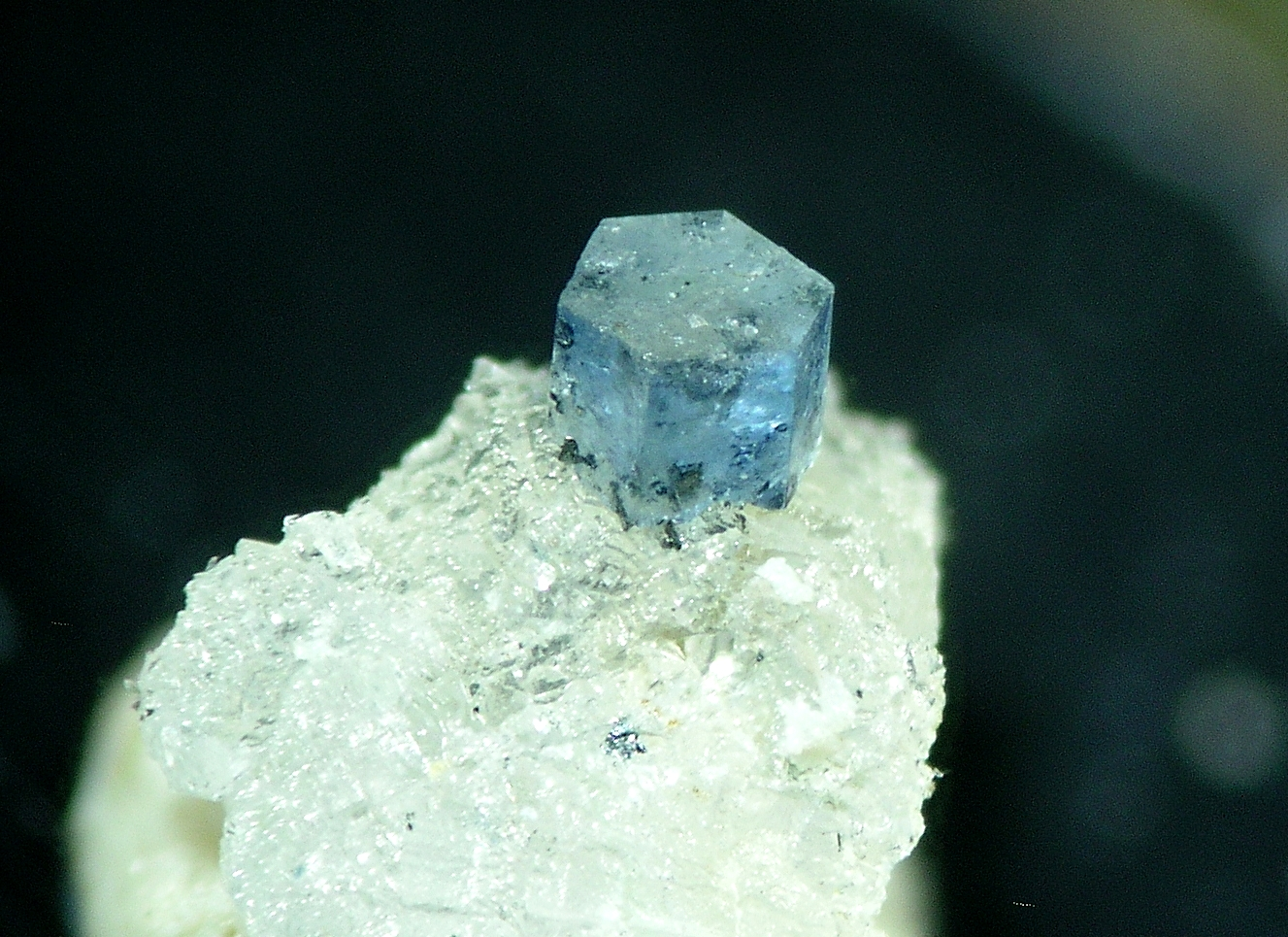
- Bazzite from Fibbia mountain, Fontana, Central St Gotthard Massif, Leventina, Ticino, Switzerland

General
- Category: Cyclosilicate
- Formula: Be_{3}Sc_{2}Si_{6}O_{18}
- IMA symbol: Bz
- Strunz classification: 9.CJ.05
- Crystal system: Hexagonal
- Crystal class: Dihexagonal dipyramidal (6/mmm); H-M symbol: (6/m 2/m 2/m)
- Space group: P6/mcc
- Unit cell: a = 9.521 Å, c = 9.165 Å; Z = 2

Identification
- Color: Light to dark sky-blue, blue green
- Crystal habit: Aggregates of subparallel prisms
- Cleavage: Indistinct on {0001}
- Fracture: Irregular
- Tenacity: Brittle
- Mohs scale hardness: 6.5–7
- Luster: Vitreous
- Streak: Pale bluish white
- Diaphaneity: Semitransparent
- Specific gravity: 2.77–2.85
- Optical properties: Uniaxial (−)
- Refractive index: n_{ω} = 1.622–1.637 n_{ε} = 1.602–1.622
- Birefringence: 0.0210
- Pleochroism: O = pale greenish yellow; E = intense sky-blue

Bazzite is a beryllium scandium cyclosilicate mineral with chemical formula Be_{3}Sc_{2}Si_{6}O_{18} (Be_{3}(Sc,Fe)_{2}Si_{6}O_{18} or Be_{3}(Sc,Al)_{2}Si_{6}O_{18}). It crystallizes in the hexagonal crystal system typically as small blue hexagonal crystals up to 2 cm length. It has a Mohs hardness of 6.5–7 and a specific gravity of 2.77 to 2.85.

It is hard to distinguish from blue beryl.

Occurs in miarolitic cavities in granite, in alpine veins and in scandium bearing granitic pegmatites. It occurs associated with quartz, orthoclase, muscovite, laumontite, albite, hematite, calcite, chlorite, fluorite, beryl and bavenite.

It was first described from an occurrence in Baveno, Italy. Named after the discoverer, the Italian engineer Alessandro E. Bazzi.
