= Epidosite =

Hydrothermally altered epidote- and quartz-bearing rock

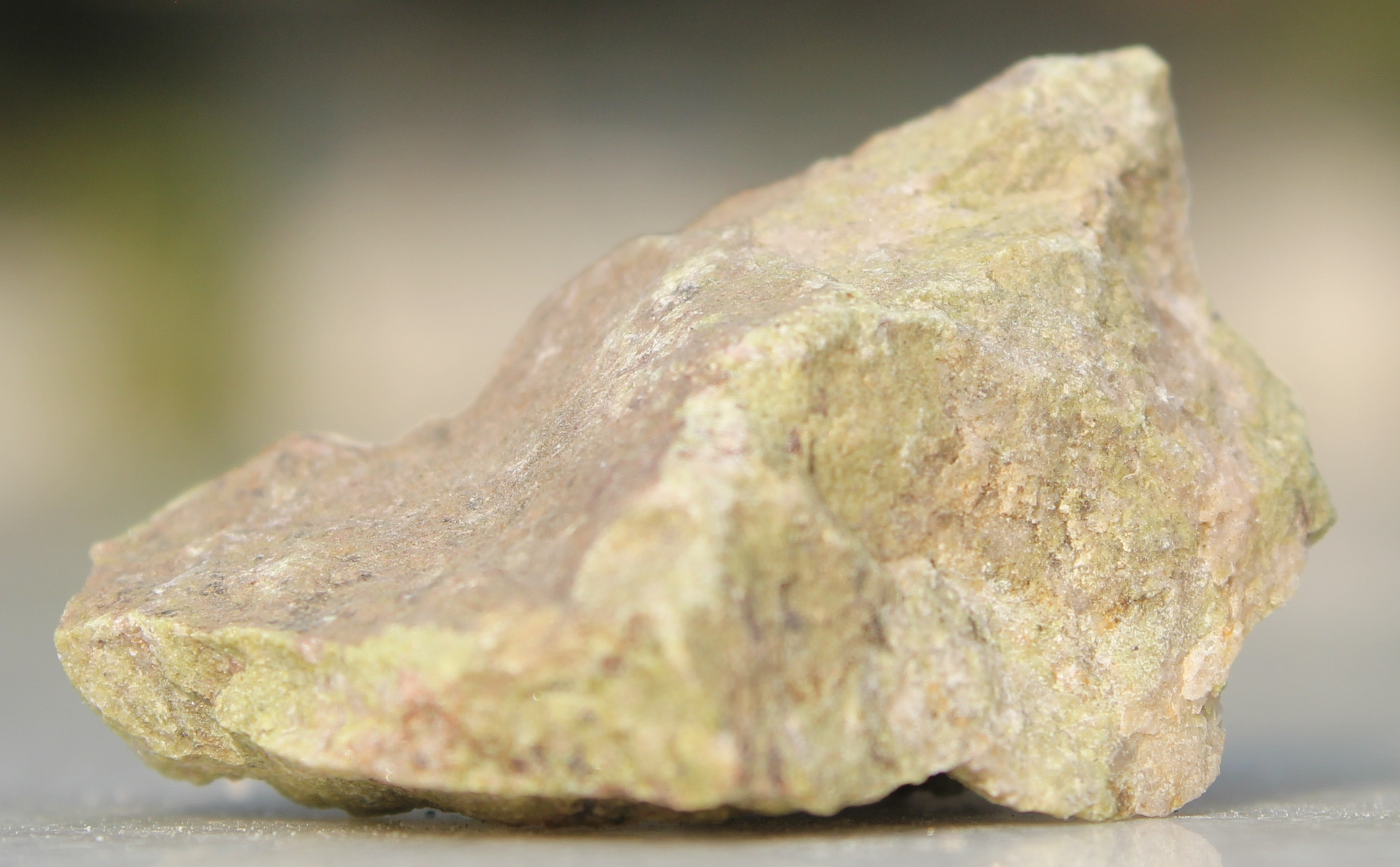
Sample of Epidosite

Epidosite (/ɪˈpɪdəsaɪt/) is a highly altered epidote and quartz bearing rock. It is the result of slow hydrothermal alteration or metasomatism of the basaltic sheeted dike complex and associated plagiogranites that occurs below the massive sulfide ore deposits which occur in ophiolites. Most epidosites represent the zone of intense metal leaching below and lateral to the sulfide deposits which is the result of convection of heated ocean water through the fractured basalts of the sheeted dikes.
