= ISTUD =

- Istituto Studi Direzionali
- Motto: Free your potential
- Type: Business School
- Established: 1970
- Affiliations: EFMD, EABIS, ASFOR
- President: Barbara Zucchi Frua
- Location: Baveno, Piedmont, Italy
- Website: www.istud.it

ISTUD (acronym for the Italian "Istituto Studi Direzionali" or Institute of Management Studies) is one of Italy's most important business schools that specializes in executive education, advanced lifelong learning, and management research. Its campus is located in Baveno, Piedmont.

Academic offers include a Master's degree in Human Resources programme, a Master in Marketing Management programme, a Master in Green Management programme, and several executive education programmes. ISTUD is also an international centre for research on topics relating to innovation, management, organisational change and socio-economic development.

== Campus ==
ISTUD's training centre is currently located in Baveno, on the west shore of Lake Maggiore, an area of outstanding natural beauty. It encloses a garden for outdoor activities and role play activities which are part of the lifelong learning method. The students are housed in a residence near the school. ISTUD also has offices in Milan.

== History ==
The school was founded in 1970 through the initiative of Confindustria and a group of large Italian and multinational companies (among them Olivetti, Pirelli, and IBM). The new school was located in Varese and the faculty was composed of professors from Harvard Business School as well as Italian professors, some of whom used to fly from Boston to Italy to teach the first classes.

The foundation of SDA Bocconi School of Management in 1971 would eventually lead to a strong rivalry between the two schools. It is said that the Bocconi students were the "grandchildren" of Adam Smith, the advocates of free trade policies, while ISTUD students were the "grandchildren" of Leo XIII, born from the pages of Rerum novarum, whose goal has always been to conciliate liberalism and profit with the culture of rights, ethics and solidarity. The corporate social responsibility is still one of the major points of both teaching and researching of the ISTUD business school and one of the roots of its identity.

In 1978 ISTUD moved to Stresa and the new school was inaugurated by Guido Carli, at the time Governor of Banca d'Italia.

The crisis of the Italian economy in the late 80's also involved ISTUD and some of the companies which founded the school and still held it. In 1994 there were persistent rumours of the rivals of Bocconi trying to take over the shares of ISTUD which caused big controversy within Confindustria. In 1995 the board approved the acquisition of 51% of the shares by Istituto Giuseppe Toniolo di Studi Superiori, already the owner of the prestigious Catholic University of Milan. Giovanni Bazoli, president of Banco Ambrosiano Veneto became chairman. This event triggered a series of deeper collaborations between the business school and the Catholic university.

Between 2004 and 2005 a newly created group of companies led by Assicurazioni Generali, Barilla Group, Ferrero SpA and Intesa Sanpaolo gained control of the school, purchasing the shares held by Istituto Toniolo. After this change of governance, the school became a foundation. In 2008 ISTUD was amongst the first business schools in Italy to become a participant and advocate of the principles for responsible management education (PRME) declared by the United Nations.

In 2012 ISTUD moved to Baveno. In its approximate 45 years of history, the business school has been attended by more than 55,000 managers and managerial staff, as well as more than 2,400 graduates.

== Credits ==
ISTUD is a member of several international networks, including the European Foundation for Management Development, the European Academy of Business in Society, and is also a partner of the European Doctoral Programmes Association in Management and Business Administration. ISTUD is also a member of ASFOR, "Associazione Italiana per la Formazione Manageriale", the most important Italian association for management education.

== Notable alumni ==
- Francesco Ricci Bitti (born 1942), Italian sports official
