= Piemontite =

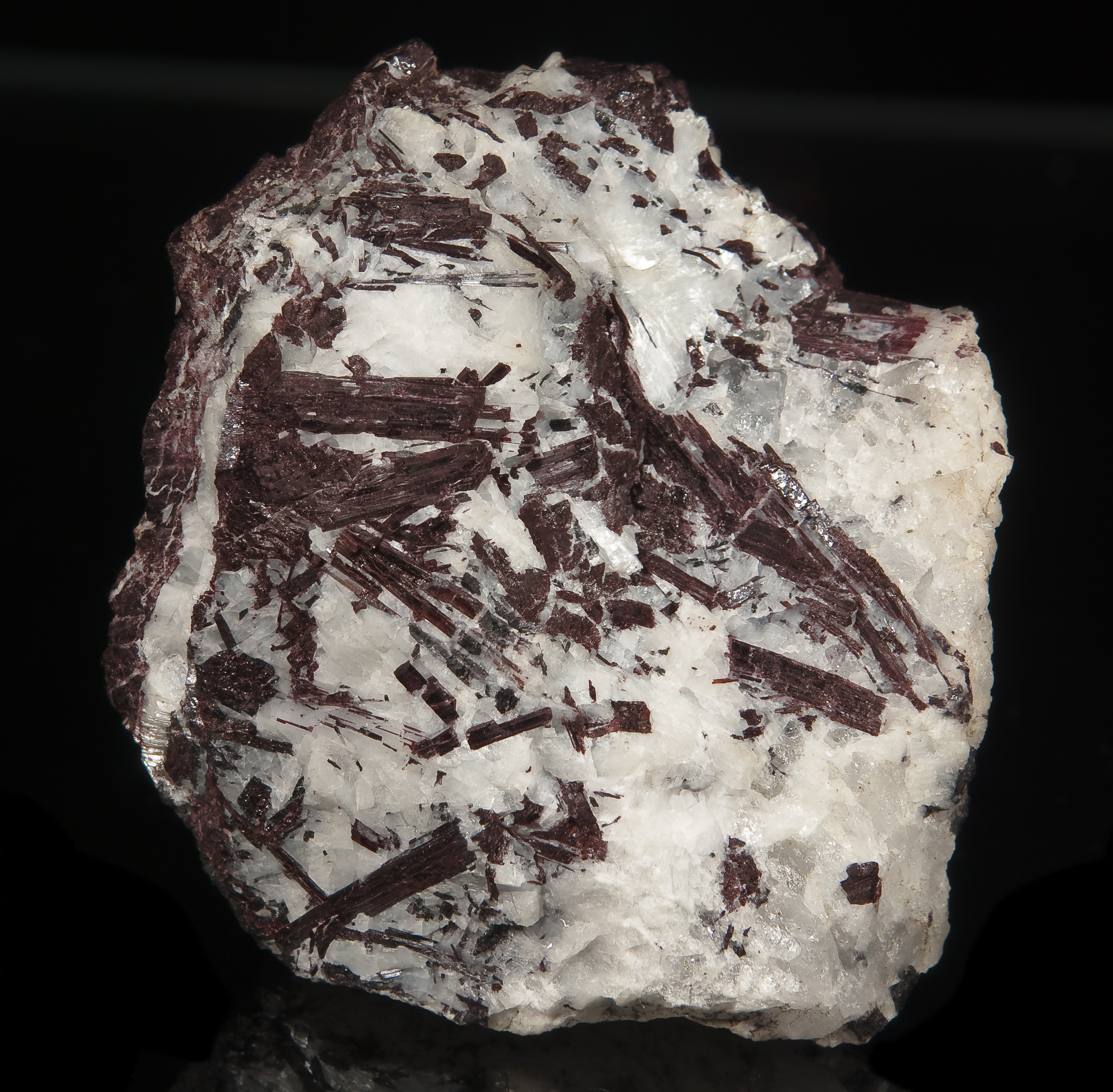
- Piémontite from the type locality: Prabornaz Mine, Italy

General
- Category: Sorosilicates; Epidote
- Formula: Ca_{2}(Al,Mn^{3+},Fe^{3+})_{3}(SiO_{4})(Si_{2}O_{7})O(OH)
- IMA symbol: Pmt
- Crystal system: Monoclinic
- Crystal class: Prismatic (2/m) (same H-M symbol)
- Space group: P2_{1}/m

Identification
- Color: Reddish-brown, reddish-black
- Crystal habit: Slender prismatic, blocky to massive
- Twinning: On [100] uncommon
- Cleavage: [001] good, [100] distinct
- Fracture: Uneven to splintery
- Tenacity: Brittle
- Mohs scale hardness: 6 – 6.5
- Luster: Vitreous
- Streak: Red
- Diaphaneity: Translucent to nearly opaque
- Density: 3.46 – 3.54
- Optical properties: Biaxial (+) 2V = 64–106
- Refractive index: nα = 1.725 – 1.756 nβ = 1.730 – 1.789 nγ = 1.750 – 1.832
- Birefringence: δ = 0.025 – 0.076
- Pleochroism: Visible
- Dispersion: r>v very strong

Piemontite is a sorosilicate mineral in the monoclinic crystal system with the chemical formula Ca_{2}(Al,Mn^{3+},Fe^{3+})_{3}(SiO_{4})(Si_{2}O_{7})O(OH). It is a member of the epidote group.

Red to reddish-brown or red-black in color, piemontite has a red streak and a vitreous lustre. Manganese (Mn^{3+}) causes the red color.

The type locality is the Prabornaz Mine, in Saint-Marcel, Aosta Valley, Italy.

It occurs metamorphic rocks of the greenschist to amphibolite metamorphic facies and in low-temperature hydrothermal veins in altered volcanic rocks. It also occurs in metasomatized deposits of manganese ore. Associated minerals include: epidote, tremolite, glaucophane, orthoclase, quartz and calcite.

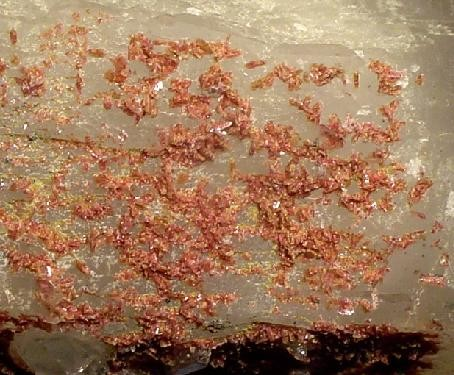
Piemontite on quartz, from No. 5 shaft, Messina mine, Limpopo Province, South Africa. Red piemontite microcrystals cover three sides of a doubly terminated quartz crystal. Size: 7.1 × 3.0 × 2.6 cm.
