= Francesco Ricci Bitti =

Italian sports administrator

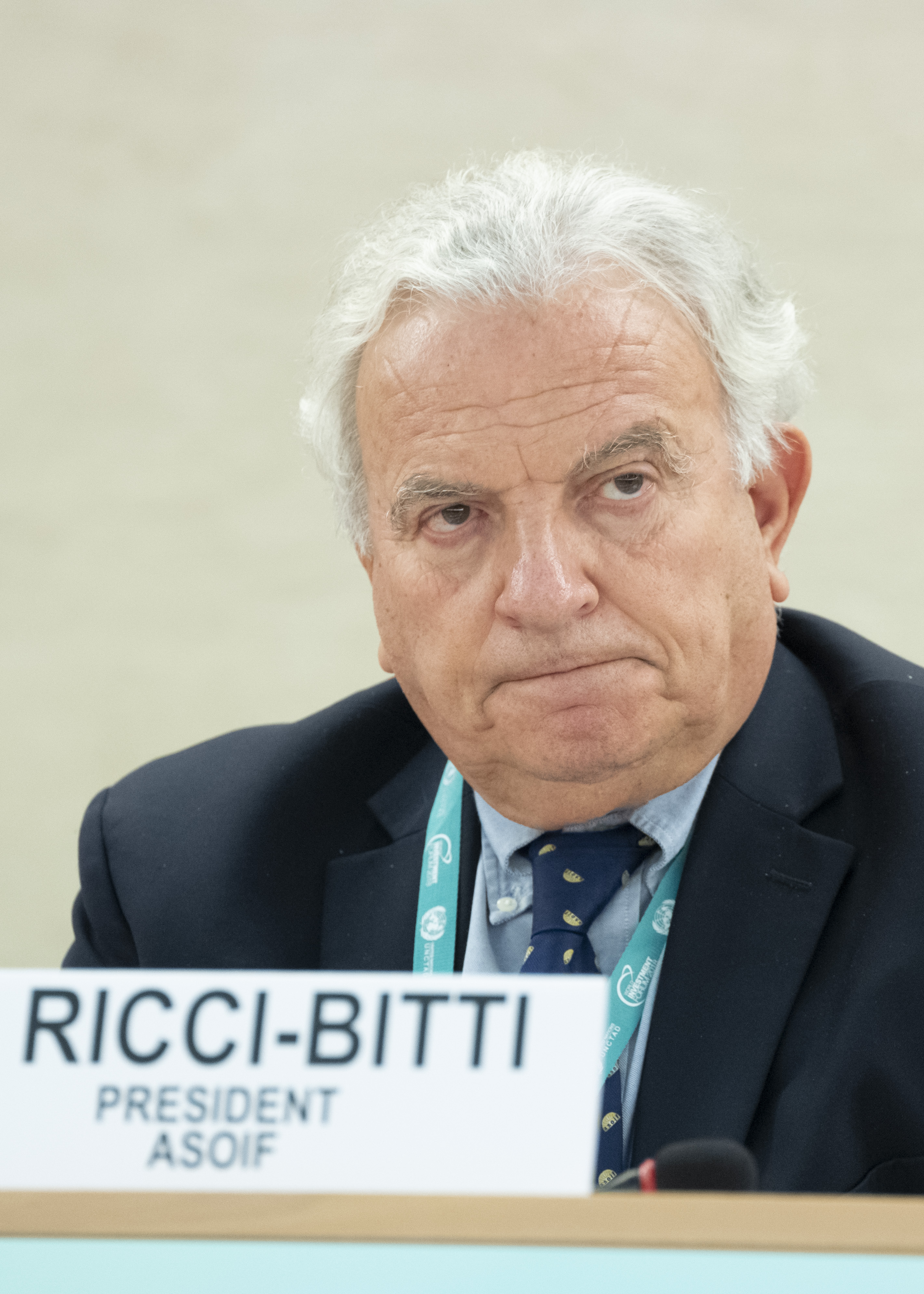
- Ricci Bitti in 2018
- Born: 15 January 1942 (age 84); Faenza, Italy
- Education: University of Bologna (PhD; Electronic Engineering); ISTUD Milan (MBA)
- Occupation: Sports administrator
- Organization: Association of Summer Olympic International Federations
- Title: President (2013–present)

Francesco Ricci Bitti (born 15 January 1942) is an Italian sports administrator and former tennis player who has presided over the Association of Summer Olympic International Federations (ASOIF) since 2013. Since 2015 he has been honorary life president of the International Tennis Federation (ITF).

== Biography ==
Ricci Bitti was born in Faenza, Emilia-Romagna. He studied electrical engineering at the University of Bologna. He has a PhD in Electronic Engineering from Bologna University and an MBA from ISTUD Milan.

He was a member of the Italian National Junior Tennis Team (1960) and won the Italian University Tennis Championships (1962, 1964, 1965). He then played international tennis (1964–71), and was a member of the Italian National Team Tennis Championships (1970–71).

In his business career, he has served on the boards of directors of Phillips, GTE, Olivetti, Alcatel, and Telecom Italy.

In his career in sports administration, he has been Chairman and a member of the Tennis Europe Junior Competitions Committees (1977–97), technical delegate for tennis at the 1984 Summer Olympics, President of Tennis Europe (1993–99), a member of the Italian National Olympic Committee Council (1997–99), President of the Italian Tennis Federation (1997–99), a mediator at the Court of Arbitration for Sport (1999–), a member of the World Anti-Doping Agency Foundation Board (2001–), a member of the Executive Board of the Italian National Olympic Committee (2006–12), and a member of the World Anti-Doping Agency Executive Committee (2008–).

=== ITF ===
He was Chairman and a member of the International Tennis Federation (ITF) Junior Competitions Committees from 1977 to 1997, and a member of the ITF Board of Directors from 1987 to 1997. He was also an ITF representative at the 1992 Olympic Games and the 1996 Olympic Games, The ITF runs the four tennis Grand Slam tournaments, the Davis Cup, and Fed Cup.

He served as President of the ITF from 1999 to 2015. He was re-elected President of the ITF for a fourth term (2011–15) at the 2011 ITF Annual General Meeting.

In November 2013, after Tunisia was suspended from the 2014 Davis Cup competition when Tunisian player Malek Jaziri was ordered by the Tunisian Tennis Federation not to compete against Israeli player Amir Weintraub at the 2013 Tashkent Challenger, Bitti said: "There is no room for prejudice of any kind in sport or in society."

=== ASOIF ===
He was a member of the Association of Summer Olympic International Federations Council (2001–09), and is now President of the Association of Summer Olympic International Federations.
