= Villa Branca =

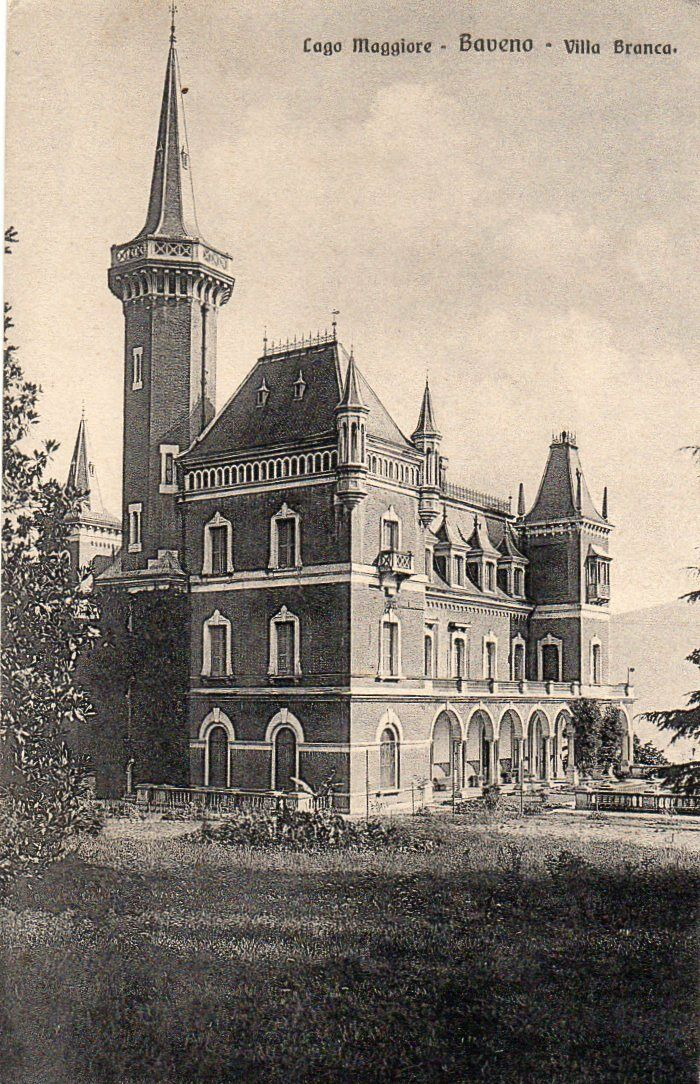
- Villa Branca in Baveno
- Click on the map for a fullscreen view

General information
- Location: Baveno, Italy
- Coordinates: 45°54′13.8″N 8°30′21.7″E

Villa Branca is a historic villa located on the shores of Lake Maggiore in Baveno, Italy.

== History ==
The villa was built between 1871 and 1873 on behalf of British engineer Charles Henfrey, who named it "Villa Clara" after his wife. During the following years, the villa hosted several notable figures, including the future German Emperor and King of Prussia Frederick III, and Queen Victoria of the United Kingdom, who stayed there between March and April 1879. In 1898, the property was purchased by the Branca family.

In January 2007, the villa was severely damaged by a fire; restoration works have since returned the residence to its original splendor.

== Description ==
The villa features a Gothic Revival style.
