= Saussurite =

Aggregate of hydrothermally altered plagioclase feldspar

General
- Category: Tectosilicate minerals
- Group: Plagioclase feldspar group
- Formula: NaAlSi_{3}O_{8} – CaAl_{2}Si_{2}O_{8}
- IMA status: Mineral aggregate

Saussurite is a mineral aggregate which is formed as a hydrothermal alteration product of plagioclase feldspar. It appears very similar to zoisite with a green or grayish-green color, it has been used as a substitute or simulant for jade.

Saussurite is not however recognized as a true mineral because it is a microscopic mixture of several other minerals, zoisite, epidote, sericite, albite or other sodium-rich feldspar along with possibly scapolite. The use of microscopic refractive index data and X-ray diffraction patterns are needed to distinguish some saussurite simulants from true jade.

It was named after the Swiss explorer Horace Benedict de Saussure, who discovered it on the slopes of Mont Blanc.
