= Baveno =

- Comune
- Comune di Baveno
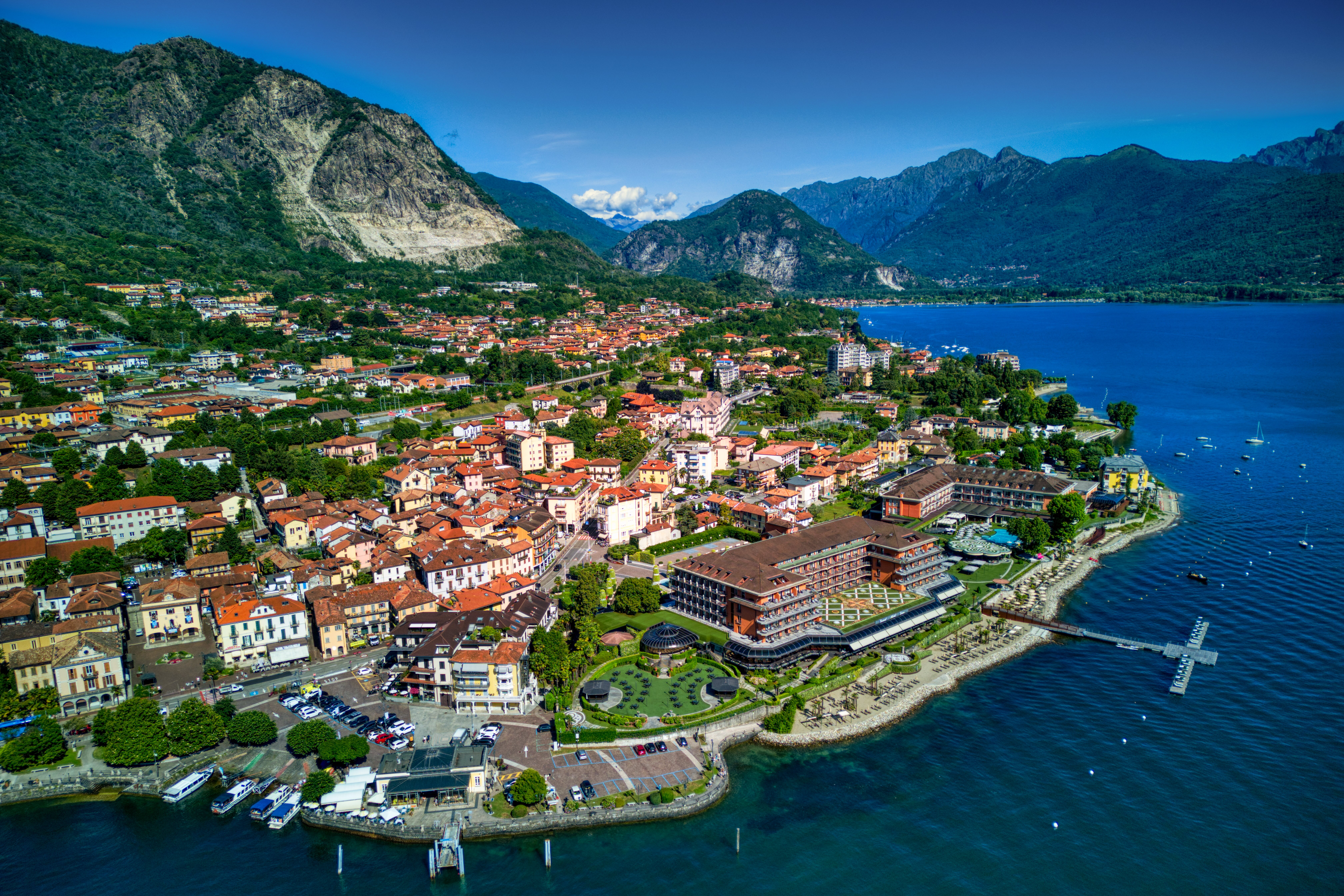

- Location within Italy Location within Piedmont
- Coordinates: 45°54′N 8°30′E
- Country: Italy
- Region: Piedmont
- Province: Province of Verbano-Cusio-Ossola (VB)
- Frazioni: Feriolo, Oltrefiume, Romanico, Roncaro, Loita

Area
  - Total: 17 km^{2} (6.6 sq mi)
- Elevation: 205 m (673 ft)

Population (2001)
  - Total: 4,527
  - Density: 270/km^{2} (690/sq mi)
- Demonym: Bavenesi
- Time zone: UTC+1 (CET)
  - Summer (DST): UTC+2 (CEST)
- Postal code: 28831
- Dialing code: 0323
- Patron saint: Gervasius and Protasius
- Saint day: 19 June
- Website: Official website

Baveno is a town and comune in the province of Verbano-Cusio-Ossola, part of Piedmont, northern Italy. It is on the west shore of Lago Maggiore, 21 kilometres (13 mi) northwest of Arona by rail.

To the north-west are the famous red granite quarries, which have supplied the columns for the Cathedral of Milan, the church of San Paolo fuori le Mura at Rome, the Galleria Vittorio Emanuele at Milan and other important buildings.

== Architecture ==
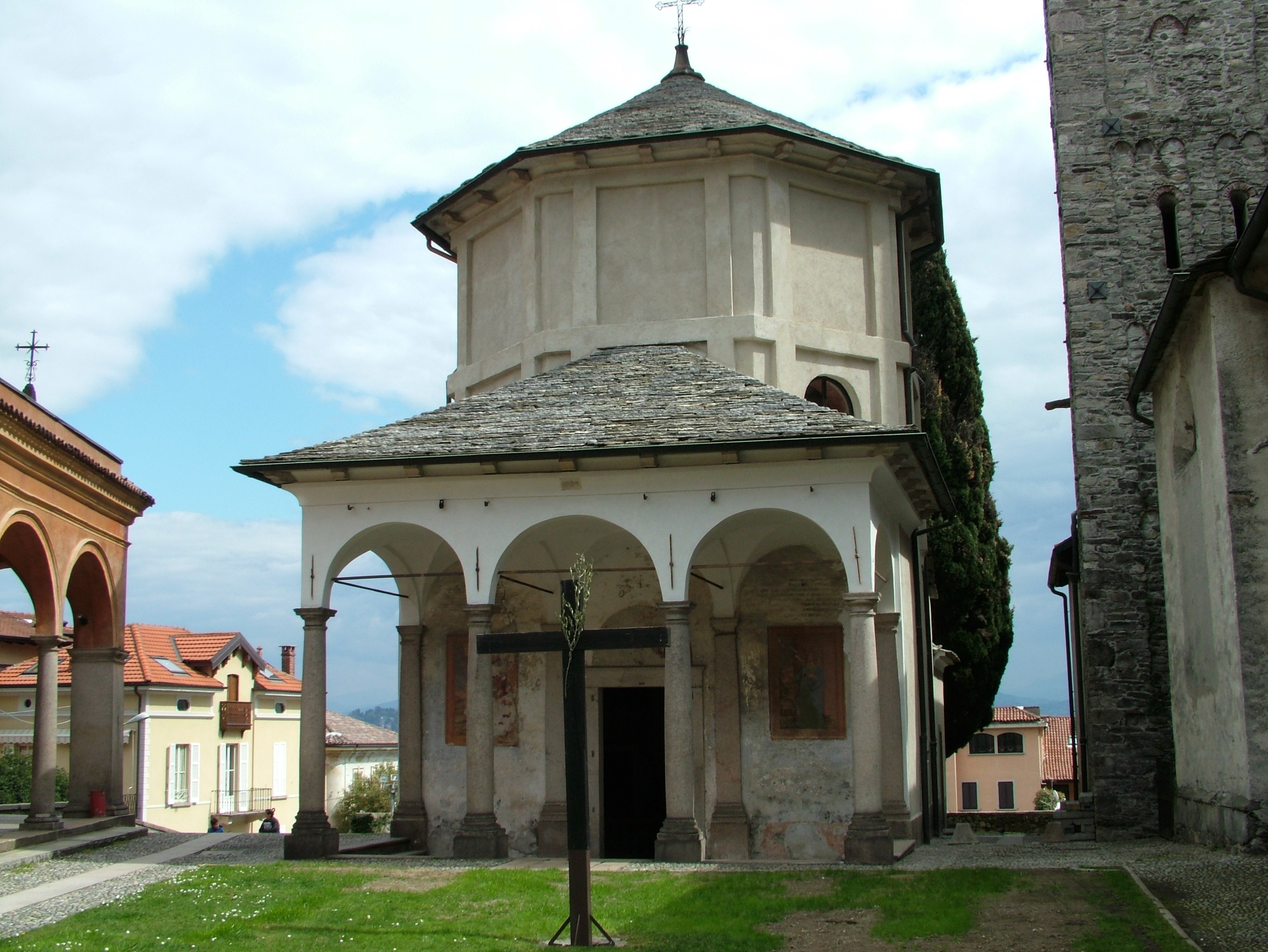
The church retains its ancient dedication to Ss Gervasio and Protasio

One of the main attractions is a historic row of villas and castles, built in the 19th century, among them Villa Branca.

== History ==
Baveno was occupied in the pre-Roman Iron Age by the Lepontii, a tribe of the Ligures.

== Minerals ==
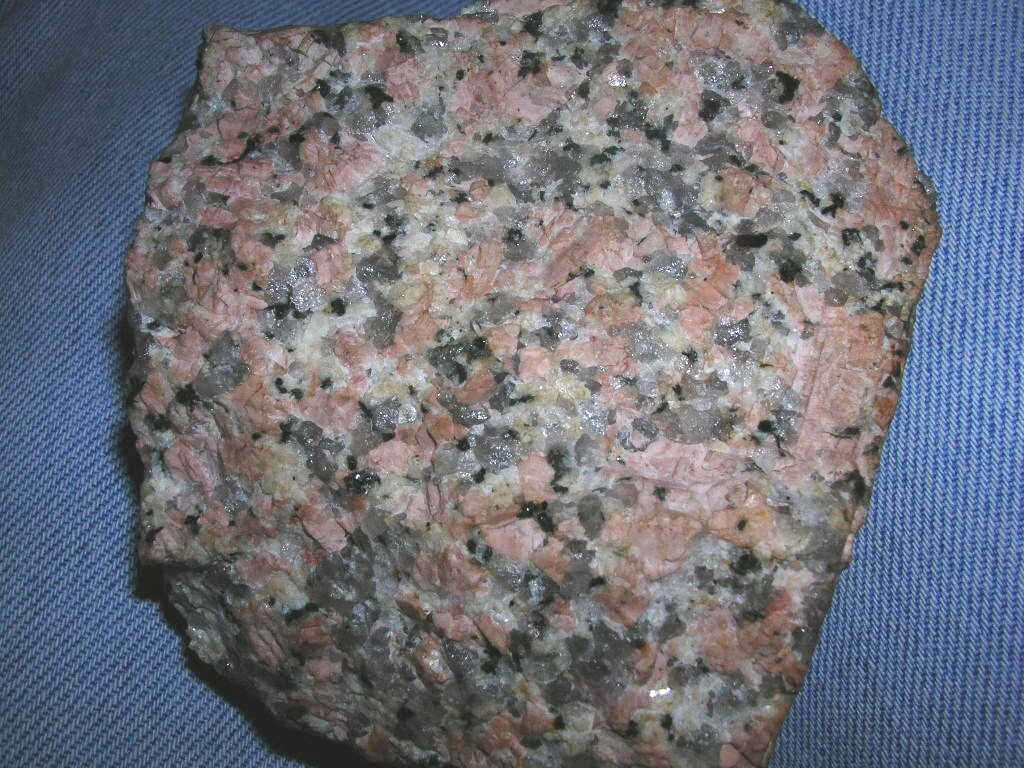
Pink granite of Baveno

- Bavenite
- Bazzite
- Scandiobabingtonite

== Twin towns — sister cities ==
Baveno is twinned with:

- Nadur, Malta

== See also ==
- ISTUD
