= Clinozoisite =

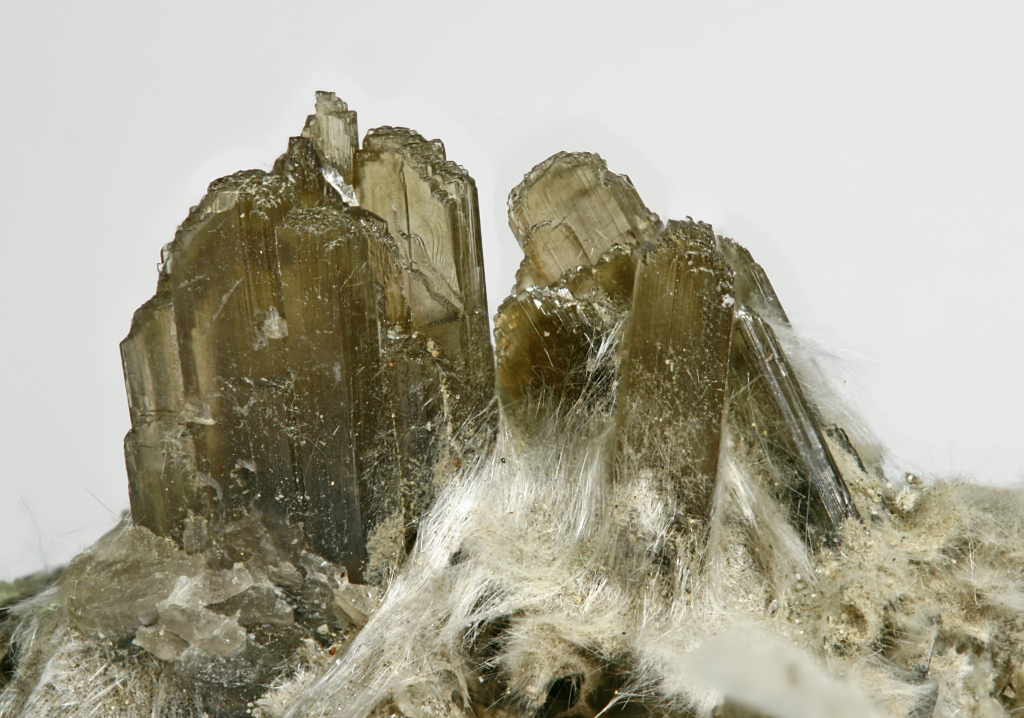
- Clinozoisite

General
- Category: Sorosilicates; Epidote group
- Formula: Ca_{2}Al_{3}(Si_{2}O_{7})(SiO_{4})O(OH)
- IMA symbol: Czo
- Strunz classification: 9.BG.05a
- Dana classification: 58.2.1a.4
- Crystal system: Monoclinic
- Crystal class: Prismatic (2/m) (same H-M symbol)
- Space group: P2_{1}/m
- Unit cell: a = 8.879, b = 5.583 c = 10.155 [Å]; β = 115.50°; Z = 2

Identification
- Color: Colorless, green, gray, light green, yellow green, pink
- Crystal habit: Elongated primatic crystals, striated; granular to fibrous
- Twinning: Lamellar on {100} uncommon
- Cleavage: Perfect on {001}
- Fracture: Irregular/uneven
- Tenacity: Brittle
- Mohs scale hardness: 6–7
- Luster: Vitreous
- Streak: Grayish white
- Diaphaneity: Transparent to translucent
- Specific gravity: 3.3–3.4
- Optical properties: Biaxial (+)
- Refractive index: n_{α} = 1.706 – 1.724 n_{β} = 1.708 – 1.729 n_{γ} = 1.712 – 1.735
- Birefringence: δ = 0.006 – 0.011
- 2V angle: 14 to 90° measured

Clinozoisite is a complex calcium aluminium sorosilicate mineral with formula: Ca_{2}Al_{3}(Si_{2}O_{7})(SiO_{4})O(OH). It forms a continuous solid solution series with epidote by substitution of iron(III) in the aluminium (m3 site) and is also called aluminium epidote.

Clinothulite is a manganese bearing variety with a pinkish hue due to substitution of Mn(III) in the aluminium site.

It was originally discovered in 1896 in East Tyrol, Austria, and is so-named because of its resemblance to zoisite and its monoclinic crystal structure.

It occurs in rocks which have undergone low to medium grade regional metamorphism and in contact metamorphism of high calcium sedimentary rocks. It also occurs in saussurite alteration of plagioclase.

Jadeite-bearing pyroxene minerals have suggested clinozoisite and paragonite are associated and derived from lawsonite releasing quartz and water via the following reaction:

$\ce{4CaAl2Si2O8(H2O)2 + NaAlSi2O6 <=> 2Ca2Al3Si3O12(OH) + NaAl3Si3O10(OH)2 + SiO2 + 6H2O}$
