= Zoisite =

Sorosilicate mineral

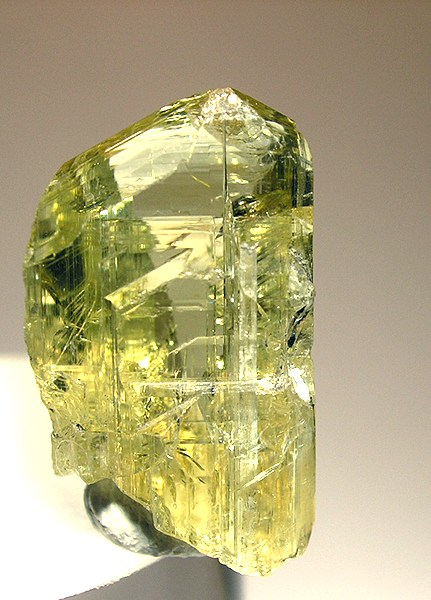
- Yellow zoisite crystal (1.7 × 1 × 0.8 cm)

General
- Category: Sorosilicate
- Formula: Ca_{2}Al_{3}(SiO_{4})(Si_{2}O_{7})O(OH)
- IMA symbol: Zo
- Strunz classification: 9.BG.10
- Dana classification: 58.2.1b.1
- Crystal system: Orthorhombic
- Crystal class: Dipyramidal (mmm); H-M symbol: (2/m 2/m 2/m)
- Space group: Pnma

Identification
- Color: White, gray, greenish brown, greenish gray, pink, blue, purple
- Crystal habit: Prismatic crystals with striations; massive to columnar
- Cleavage: Perfect {010} imperfect {100}
- Fracture: Uneven to conchoidal
- Mohs scale hardness: 6 to 7
- Luster: Vitreous, pearly on cleavage surfaces
- Streak: White or colorless
- Diaphaneity: Transparent to translucent
- Specific gravity: 3.10–3.36
- Optical properties: biaxial positive
- Refractive index: nα = 1.696 – 1.700 nβ = 1.696 – 1.702 nγ = 1.702 – 1.718
- Birefringence: 0.006–0.018
- Pleochroism: X = pale pink to red-violet; Y = nearly colorless to bright pink or deep blue; Z = pale yellow to yellow-green

Major varieties
- Tanzanite: Gem-quality zoisite, blue-purple
- Thulite: Pink

Zoisite, first known as saualpite, after its type locality, is a calcium aluminum hydroxy sorosilicate. Its chemical formula is Ca_{2}Al_{3}(SiO_{4})(Si_{2}O_{7})O(OH). It was formerly considered a member of the epidote group.

Zoisite occurs as prismatic, orthorhombic (2/m 2/m 2/m) crystals or in massive form, being found in metamorphic and pegmatitic rock. Zoisite may be blue to violet, green, brown, pink, yellow, gray, or colorless. Blue crystals are known under the name tanzanite. It has a vitreous luster and a conchoidal to uneven fracture. When euhedral, zoisite crystals are striated parallel to the principal axis (c-axis). Also parallel to the principal axis is one direction of perfect cleavage. The mineral is between 6 and 7 on the Mohs hardness scale, and its specific gravity ranges from 3.10 to 3.38, depending on the variety. It streaks white and is said to be brittle. Clinozoisite is a more common monoclinic polymorph of Ca_{2}Al_{3}(SiO_{4})(Si_{2}O_{7})O(OH). Transparent material is fashioned into gemstones while translucent-to-opaque material is usually carved.

The mineral was described by Abraham Gottlob Werner in 1805. He named it after the Carniolan naturalist Sigmund Zois, who sent him its specimens from Saualpe in Carinthia. Zois realized that this was an unknown mineral when it was brought to him by a mineral dealer, presumed to be Simon Prešern, in 1797.

Sources of zoisite include Tanzania (tanzanite), Kenya (anyolite), Norway (thulite), Switzerland, Austria, India, Pakistan, and the U.S. state of Washington.

More recently, the thulite variety has been found in Canada, in the Jeffrey Mine (Val-des-sources, QC) and in British Columbia.

== See also ==
- List of minerals
- List of minerals named after people

== Bibliography ==
- Hurlbut, Cornelius S.; Klein, Cornelis, 1985, Manual of Mineralogy, 20th ed., ISBN 0-471-80580-7
- Faye, G. H.; Nickel, E. H. (1971). "On the pleochroism of vanadium-bearing zoisite from Tanzania" (PDF). The Canadian Mineralogist. 10: 812–821.
