= Epidote =

Sorosilicate mineral

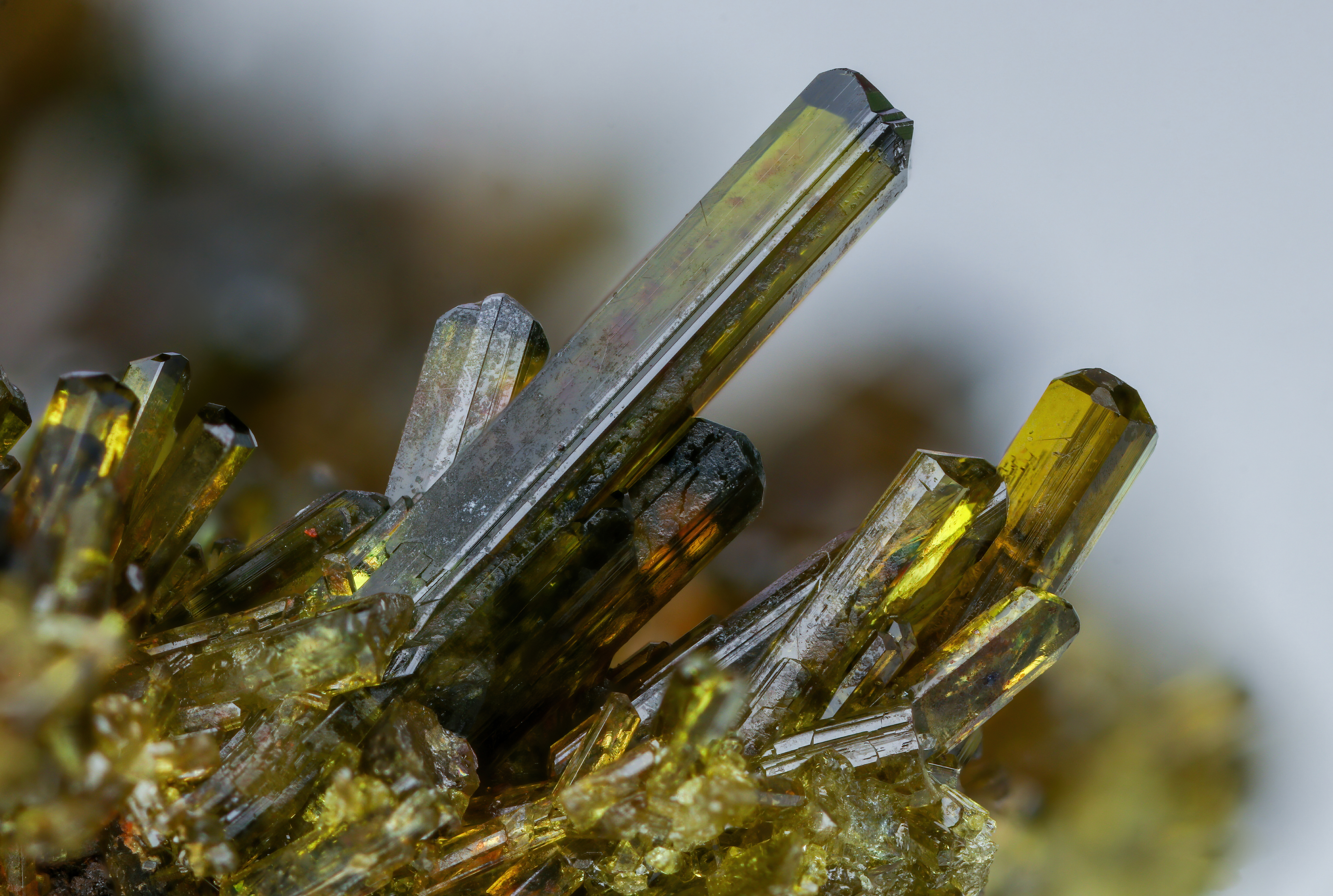

General
- Category: Sorosilicates
- Formula: {Ca_{2}}{Al_{2}Fe^{3+}}(SiO_{4})(Si_{2}O_{7})O(OH)
- IMA symbol: Ep
- Crystal system: Monoclinic
- Crystal class: Prismatic (2/m) (same H–M symbol)
- Space group: P2_{1}/m

Identification
- Color: Pistachio green, yellow-green, greenish black, brownish-green, green, black
- Crystal habit: Prismatic with striations, fibrous, massive
- Twinning: On [100]
- Cleavage: {001} perfect and {100} imperfect
- Fracture: Flat regular to uneven
- Mohs scale hardness: 6–7
- Luster: Vitreous to resinous
- Streak: Greyish white
- Diaphaneity: Transparent to nearly opaque
- Specific gravity: 3.38–3.49
- Optical properties: Biaxial (−)
- Refractive index: n_{α} = 1.715–1.751 n_{β} = 1.725–1.784 n_{γ} = 1.734–1.797
- Birefringence: δ = 0.019–0.046
- Pleochroism: Strong

Epidote is a calcium aluminium iron sorosilicate mineral.

== Description ==
Well-developed crystals of epidote, Ca_{2}Al_{2}(Fe^{3+};Al)(SiO_{4})(Si_{2}O_{7})O(OH), crystallizing in the monoclinic system, are of frequent occurrence: they are commonly prismatic in habit, the direction of elongation being perpendicular to the single plane of symmetry. The name epidote, due to Haüy, is derived from the Greek word 'epidosis' (ἐπίδοσις), meaning "increase", in allusion to the crystal characteristic of one longer side at the base of the prism. The faces are often deeply striated and crystals are often twinned. Many of the characters of the mineral vary with the amount of iron present for instance, the color, the optical constants, and the specific gravity. The color is green, grey, brown or nearly black, but usually a characteristic shade of yellowish-green or pistachio-green. It displays strong pleochroism, the pleochroic colors being usually green, yellow and brown. Clinozoisite is green, white or pale rose-red group species containing very little iron, thus having the same chemical composition as the orthorhombic mineral zoisite.

Epidote is an abundant rock-forming mineral, but one of secondary origin. It occurs in marble and schistose rocks of metamorphic origin. It is also a product of hydrothermal alteration of various minerals (feldspars, micas, pyroxenes, amphiboles, garnets, and others) composing igneous rocks. A rock composed of quartz and epidote is known as epidosite. Well-developed crystals are found at many localities: Knappenwand, near the Großvenediger in the Untersulzbachthal in Salzburg, as magnificent, dark green crystals of long prismatic habit in cavities in epidote schist, with asbestos, adularia, calcite, and apatite; the Ala valley and Traversella in Piedmont; Arendal in Norway; Le Bourg-d'Oisans in Dauphiné; Haddam in Connecticut; Prince of Wales Island in Alaska, here as large, dark green, tabular crystals with copper ores in metamorphosed limestone.

The perfectly transparent, dark green crystals from the Knappenwand and from Brazil have occasionally been cut as gemstones. The green part of several mixed-rock ornamental stones is composed of epidote. These include Unakite and Australian Dragon Bloodstone.

=== Related species ===
Belonging to the same isomorphous group with epidote are the REE-rich allanite (containing primarily lanthanum, cerium, and yttrium), and the manganese-rich piemontite.

Piemontite occurs as small, reddish-black, monoclinic crystals in the manganese mines at San Marcel, near Ivrea in Piedmont, and in crystalline schists at several places in Japan. The purple color of the Egyptian porfido rosso antico is due to the presence of this mineral.

Allanite and dollaseite-(Ce) have the same general epidote formula and contain metals of the cerium group. In external appearance allanite differs widely from epidote, being black or dark brown in color, pitchy in lustre, and opaque in the mass; further, there is little or no cleavage, and well-developed crystals are rare. The crystallographic and optical characters are similar to those of epidote; the pleochroism is strong with reddish-, yellowish-, and greenish-brown colors. Although not a common mineral, allanite is of fairly wide distribution as a primary accessory constituent of many crystalline rocks, gneiss, granite, syenite, rhyolite, andesite, and others. It was first found in the granite of east Greenland and described by Thomas Allan in 1808, after whom the species was named. Allanite is a mineral readily altered by hydration, becoming optically isotropic and amorphous: for this reason several varieties have been distinguished, and many different names applied. Orthite was the name given by Jöns Berzelius in 1818 to a hydrated form found as slender prismatic crystals, sometimes a foot in length, at Finbo, near Falun in Sweden. Dollaseite is less common, famous from the Ostanmossa mine in the Norberg district of Sweden.

== Gallery ==
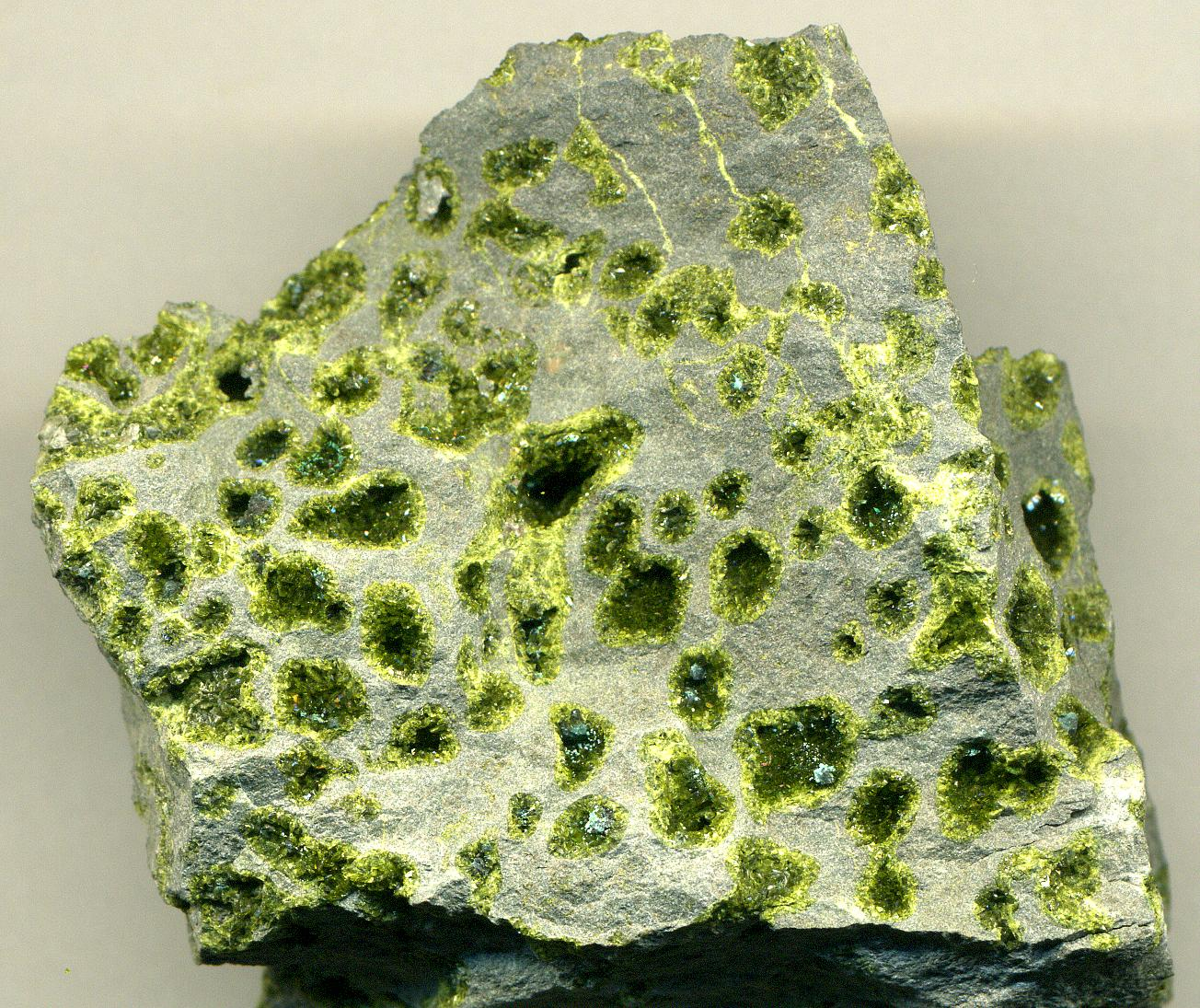
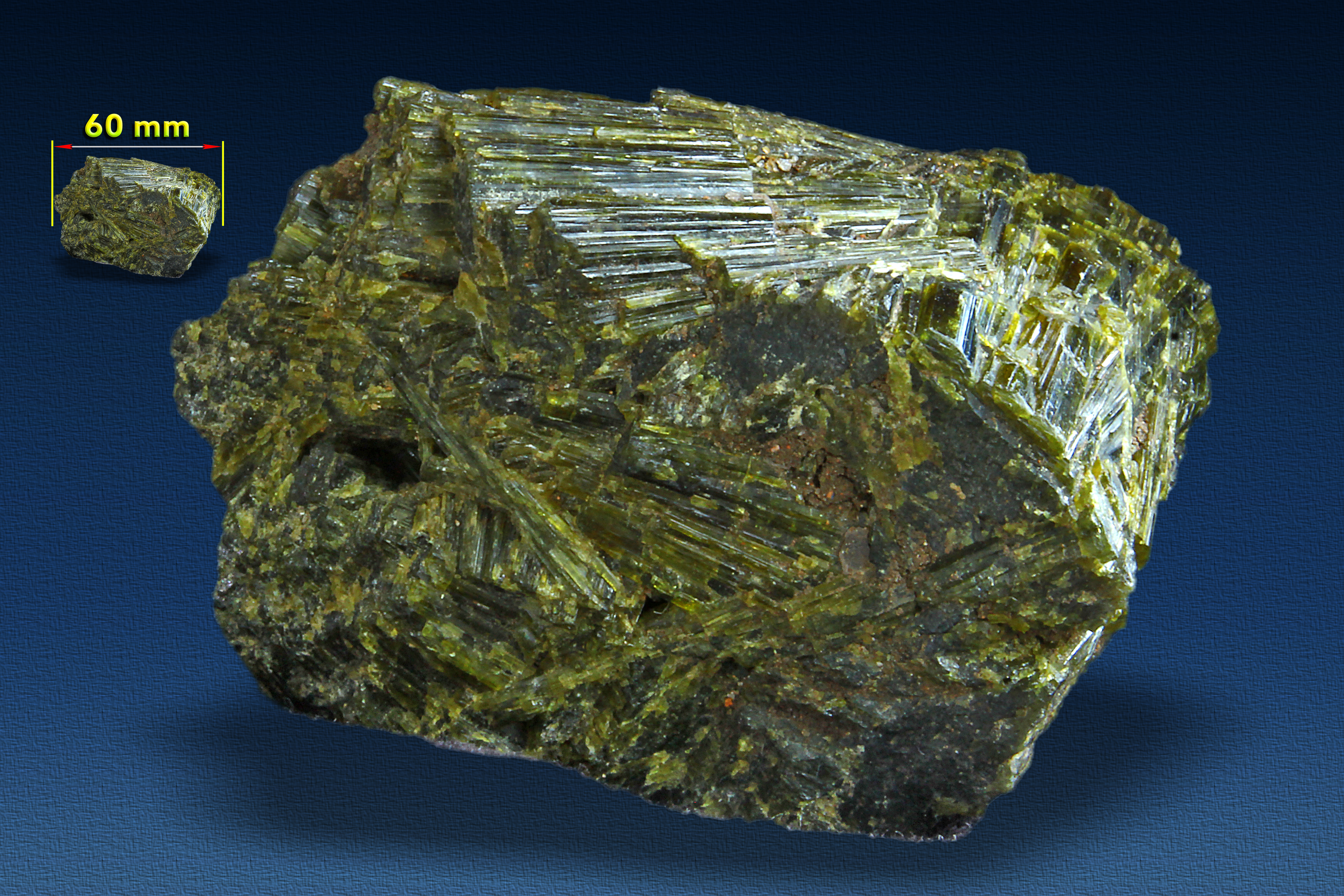
Epidot – Prowincja Antsiranana, Madagaskar
Vesicular basalt with epidote crystal filling

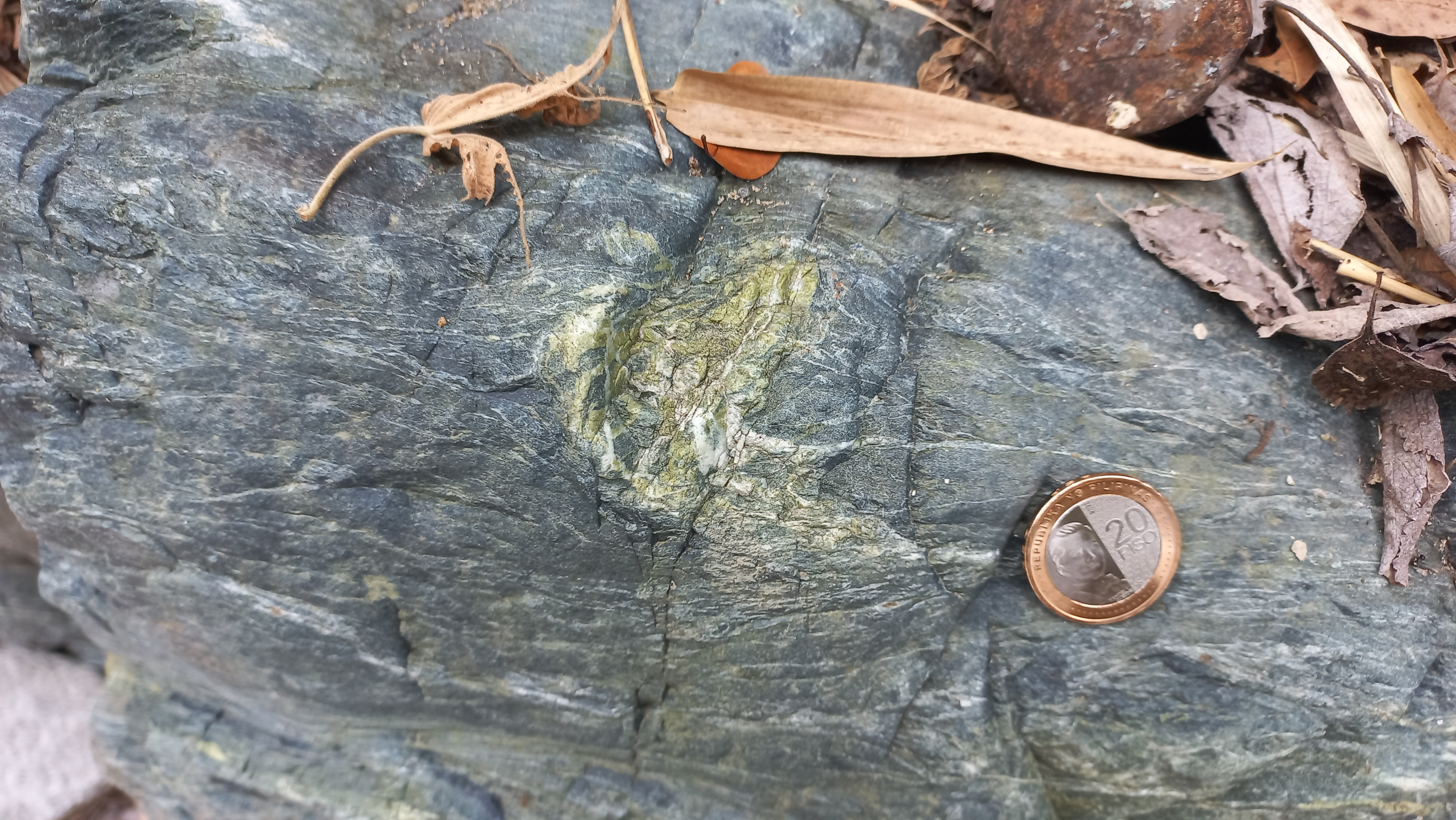
Deformed epidote within greenschist rock from Itogon, Philippines

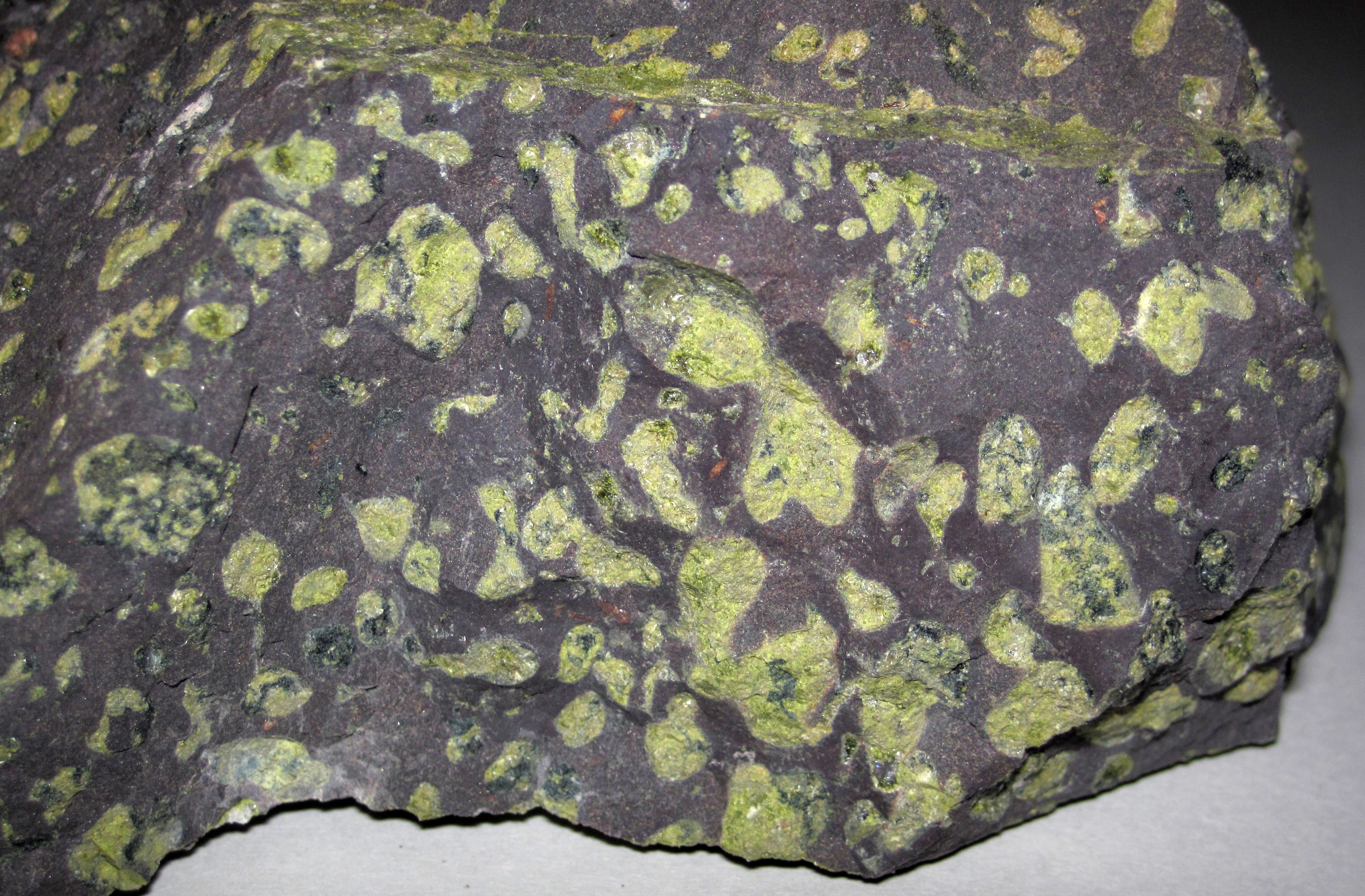
Amygdaloidal basalt filled with epidote

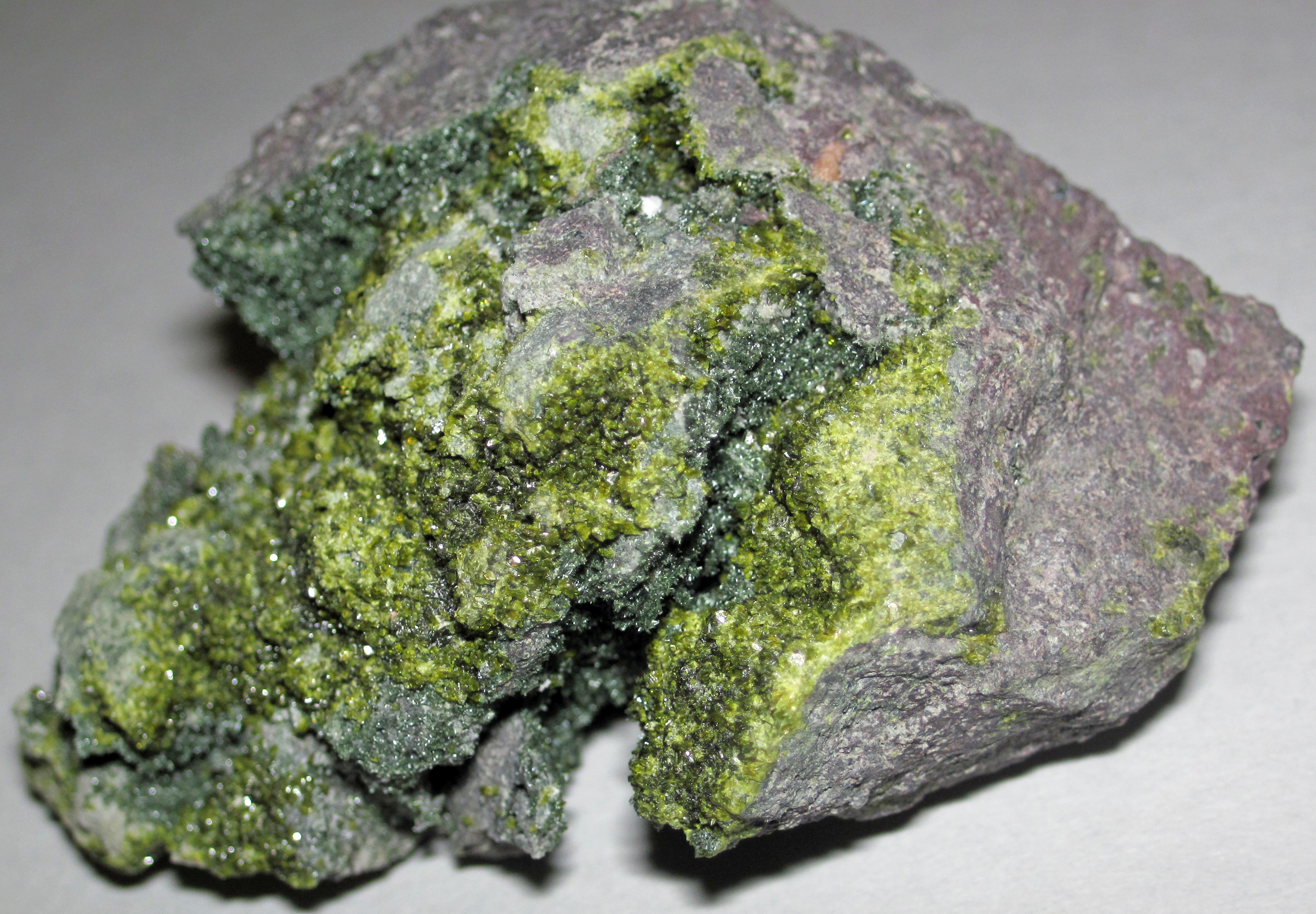
Vug in basalt lined with epidote

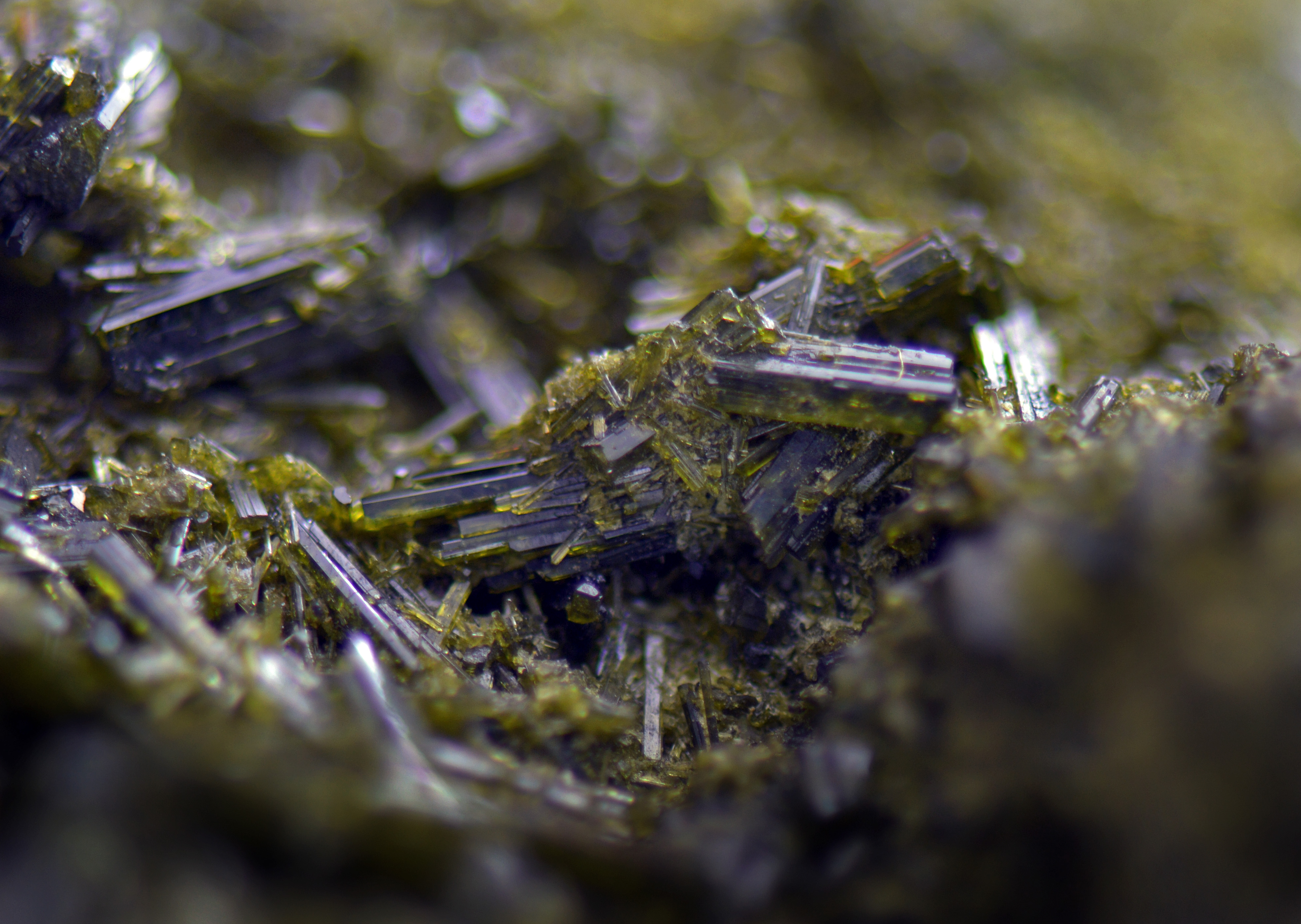
Epidote from France

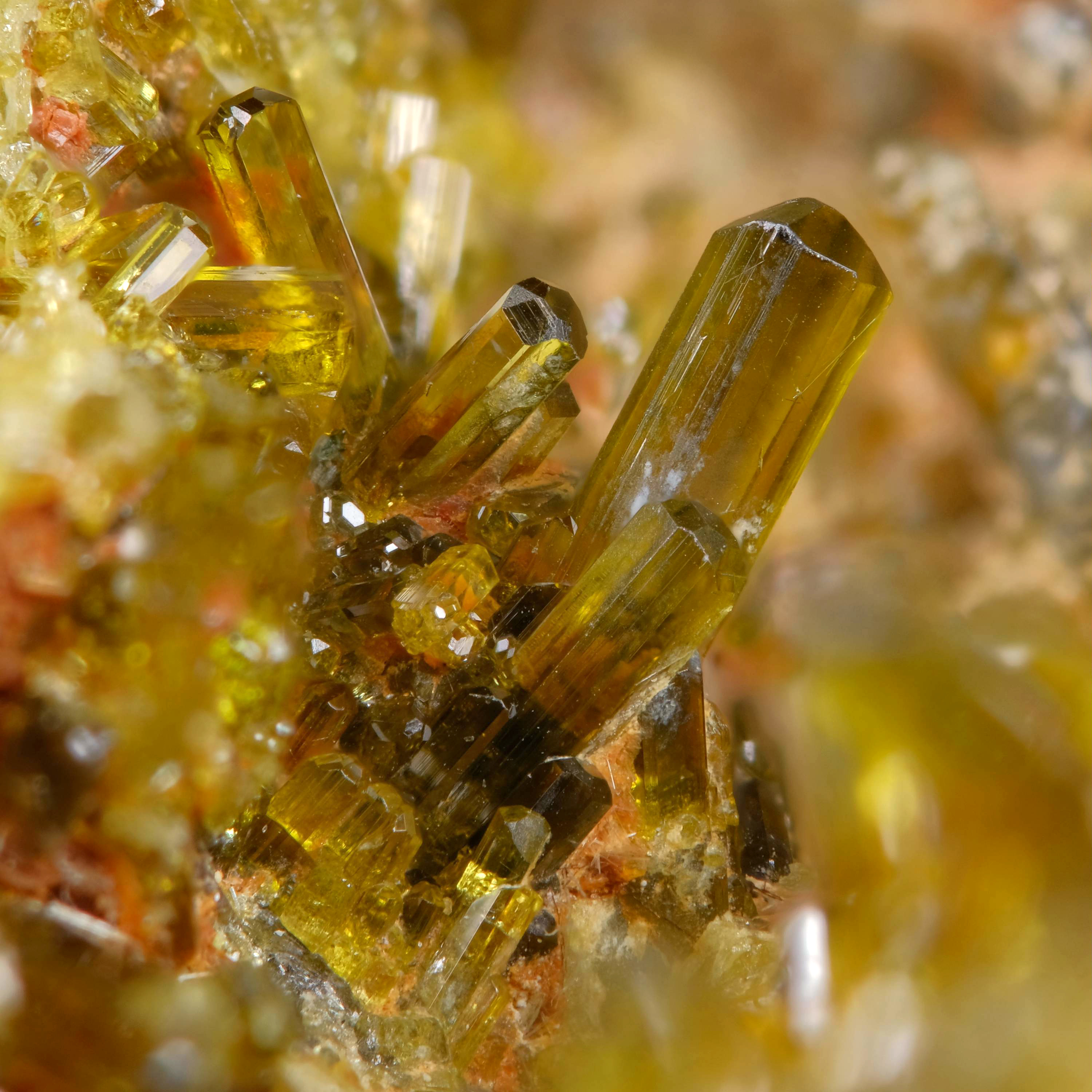
Epidote from Russia

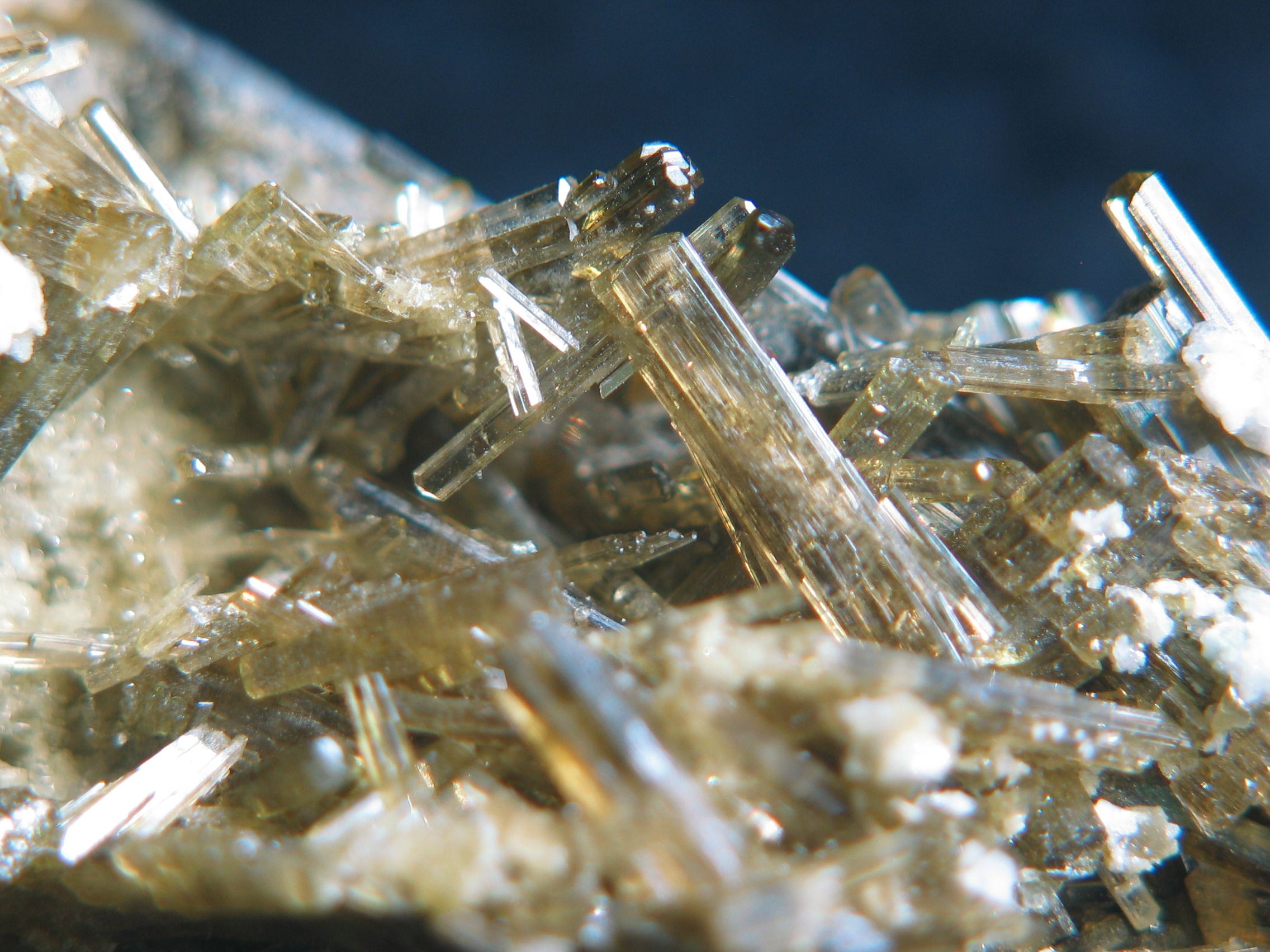
Epidote from Pakistan

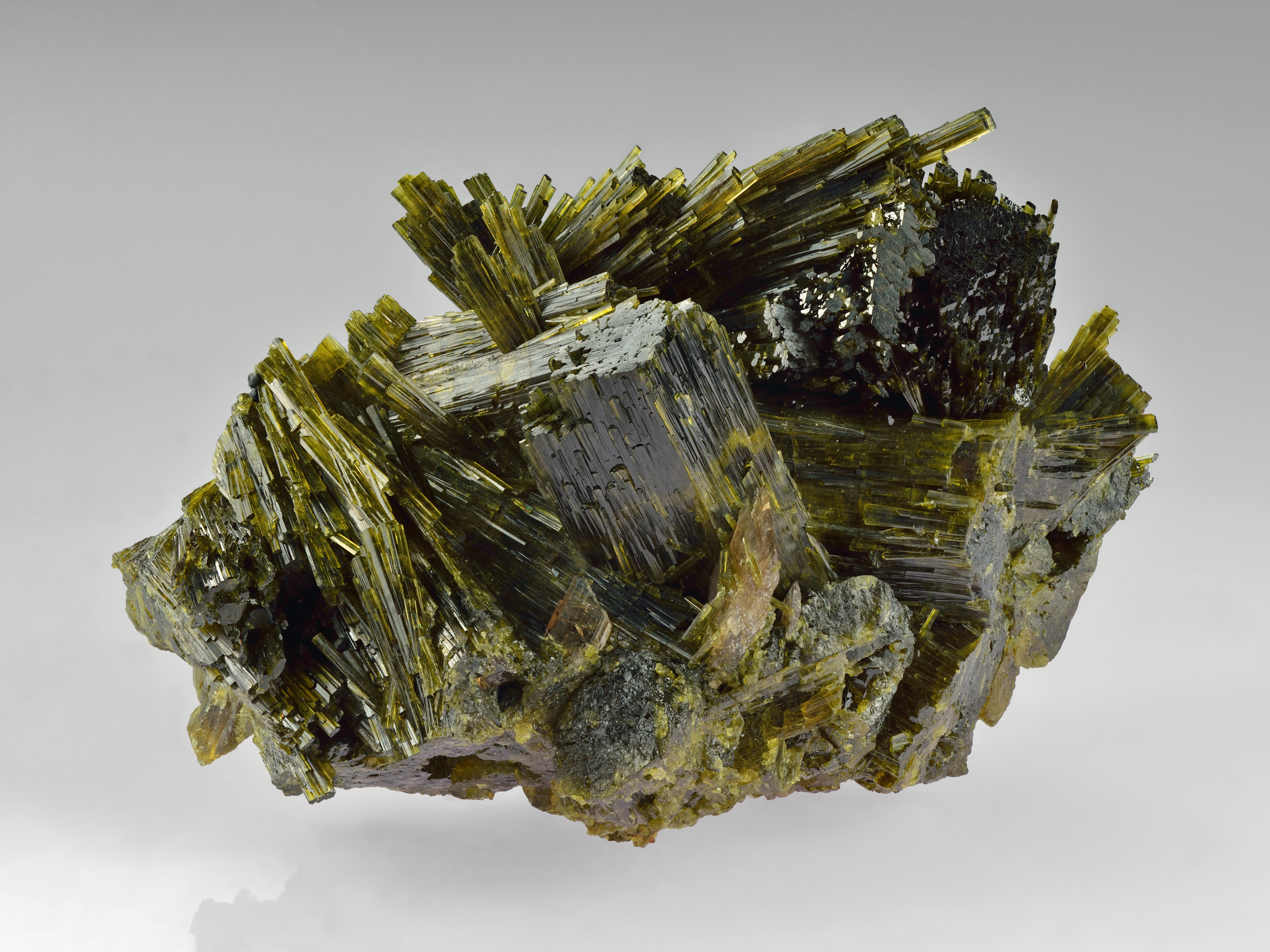
Epidote from Lima, Peru

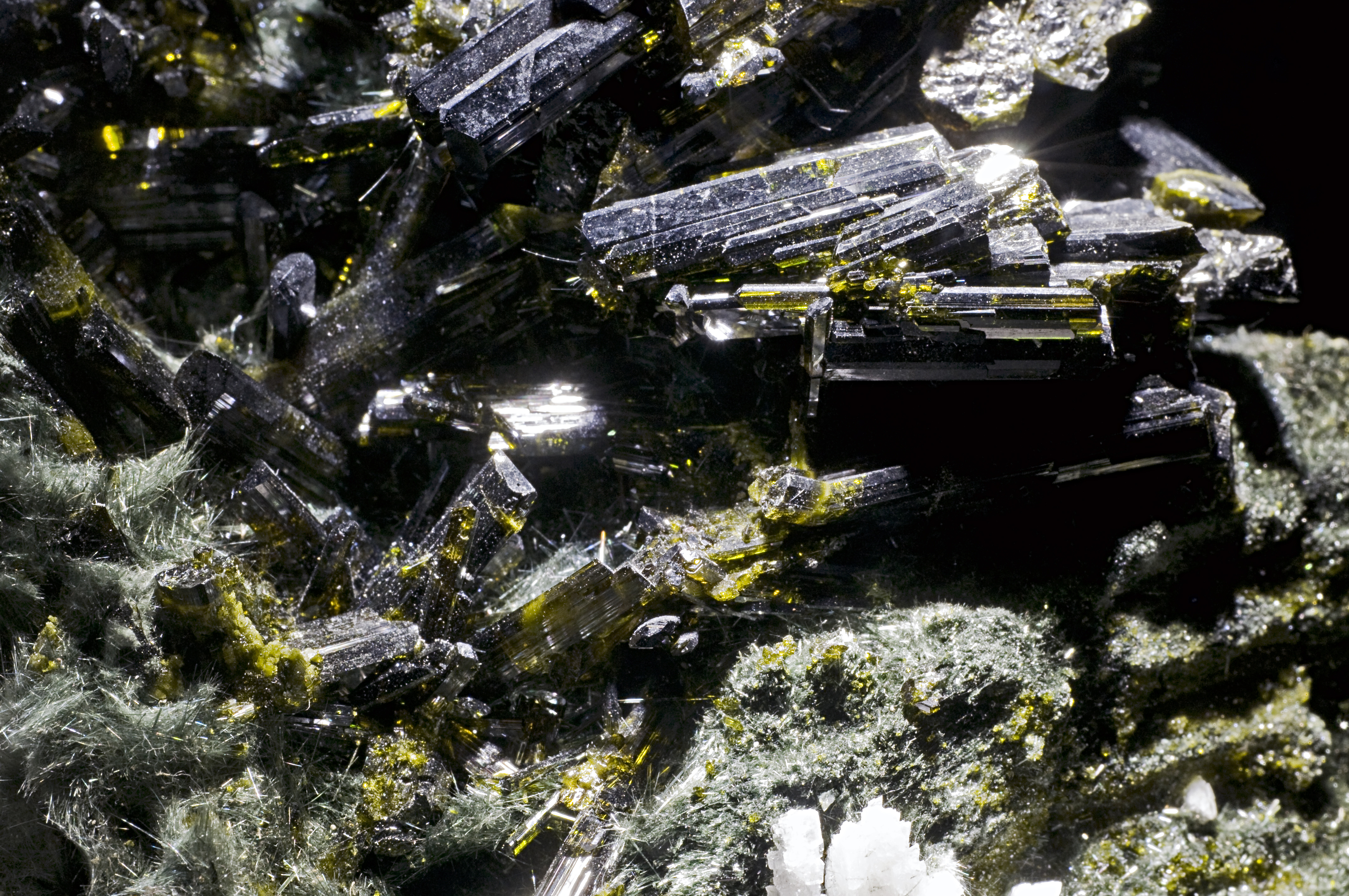
Epidote from Germany

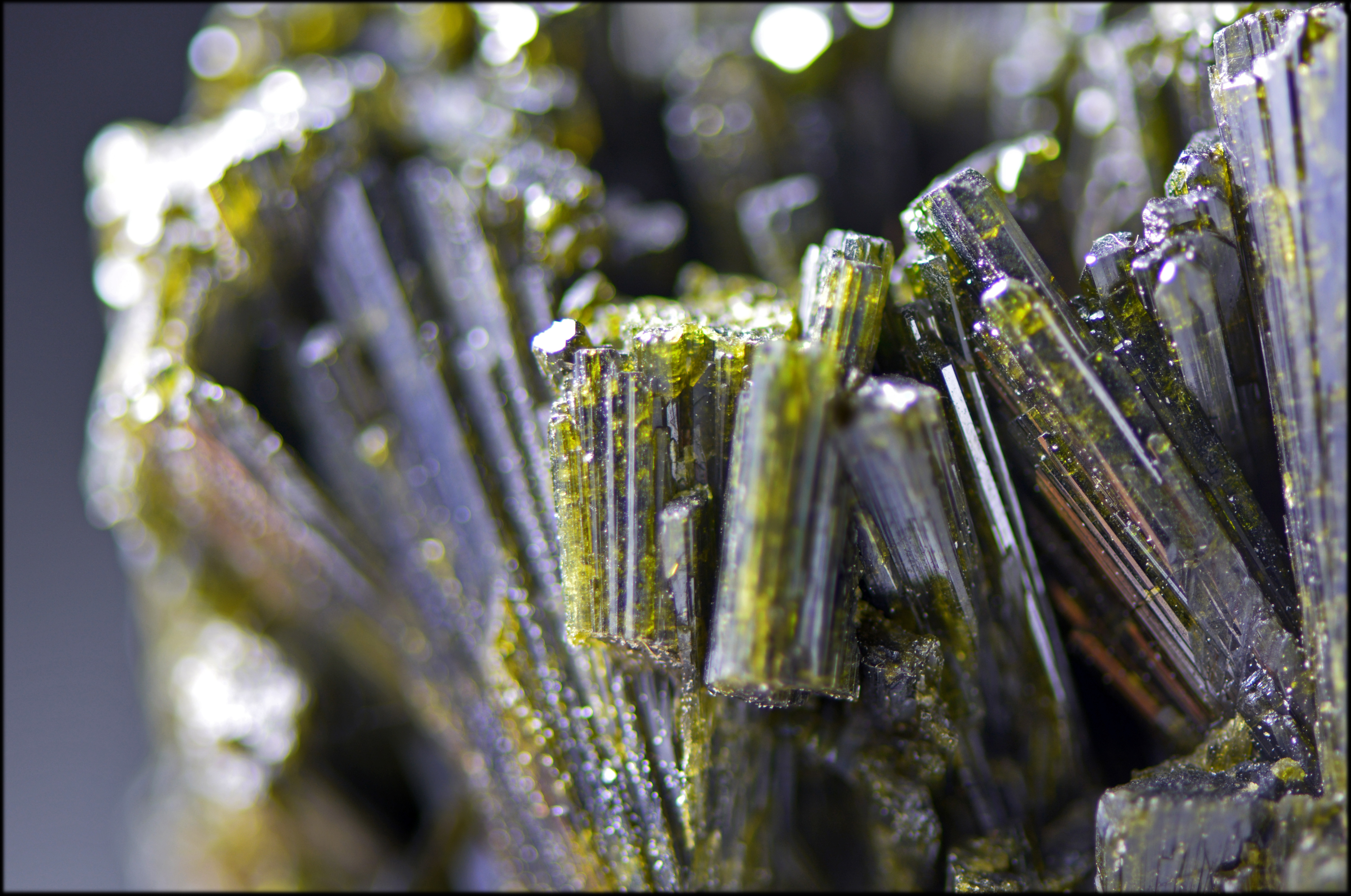
Epidote from France
