= Subduction zone metamorphism =

Changes of rock due to pressure and heat near a subduction zone

Melt production and accretion of melt onto continental crust in a subduction zone

A subduction zone is a region of the Earth's crust where one tectonic plate moves under another tectonic plate; oceanic crust gets recycled back into the mantle and continental crust gets produced by the formation of arc magmas. Arc magmas account for more than 20% of terrestrially produced magmas and are produced by the dehydration of minerals within the subducting slab as it descends into the mantle and are accreted onto the base of the overriding continental plate. Subduction zones host a unique variety of rock types formed by the high-pressure, low-temperature conditions a subducting slab encounters during its descent. The metamorphic conditions the slab passes through in this process generates and alters water bearing (hydrous) mineral phases, releasing water into the mantle. This water lowers the melting point of mantle rock, initiating melting. Understanding the timing and conditions in which these dehydration reactions occur, is key to interpreting mantle melting, volcanic arc magmatism, and the formation of continental crust.

Pressure-temperature pathway for subducted crust

A metamorphic facies is characterized by a stable mineral assemblage specific to a pressure-temperature range and specific starting material. Subduction zone metamorphism is characterized by a low temperature, high-ultrahigh pressure metamorphic path through the zeolite, prehnite-pumpellyite, blueschist, and eclogite facies stability zones of subducted oceanic crust. Zeolite and prehnite-pumpellyite facies assemblages may or may not be present, thus the onset of metamorphism may only be marked by blueschist facies conditions. Subducting slabs are composed of basaltic crust topped with pelagic sediments; however, the pelagic sediments may be accreted onto the forearc-hanging wall and not subducted. Most metamorphic phase transitions that occur within the subducting slab are prompted by the dehydration of hydrous mineral phases. The breakdown of hydrous mineral phases typically occurs at depths greater than 10 km. Each of these metamorphic facies is marked by the presence of a specific stable mineral assemblage, recording the metamorphic conditions undergone by the subducting slab. Transitions between facies cause hydrous minerals to dehydrate at certain pressure-temperature conditions and can therefore be tracked to melting events in the mantle beneath a volcanic arc.

== Oceanic crust ==
Arc magmas are produced by partial melting of metasomatic domains in the mantle wedge, which have reacted with liquid phases derived from dehydration melting of minerals contained in the subducting oceanic crust formed at mid-ocean ridges. The subducting oceanic crust consists of four major units. The topmost unit is a thin cap of pelagic sediments up to 0.3 km thick composed of siliceous and calcareous shells, meteoric dusts, and variable amounts of volcanic ash. The next unit is composed of 0.3–0.7 km thick pillow basalts, formed by the quenching of basaltic magma as it erupts into ocean water. Under the pillow basalts is a basaltic sheeted dike complex, that represent cooled magma conduits. The bottom units represent the crystallized magma chamber, feeding the mid-ocean ridge at which the crust was formed. It is composed of 1–5 km thick layered gabbro atop <7 km thick layer of ultramafic rocks (e.g. wehrlite, harzburgite, dunite, and chromite). Oceanic crust is referred to as a metabasite.

== Hydrous minerals of a subducting slab ==
Every year, 1–2 x 10 trillion kilograms of water descends into subduction zones. Approximately 90–95% of that water is contained in hydrous minerals, including mica, phengite, amphibole, lawsonite, chlorite, talc, zoisite, and serpentine. The most significant hydrous minerals are lawsonite (11 wt% H_{2}O), phlogopite (2 wt% H_{2}O) and amphibole (2 wt% H_{2}O). Phlogopite does not release water until approximately 200 km depth whereas amphibole releases water at approximately 75 km depth. Serpentine is also an important hydrous phase (13 wt% H_{2}O) that is only present in oceanic crust formed at a slow spreading ridge where ultramafic rocks are emplaced at shallow levels. Lawsonite does not release water until approximately 300 km depth and is the last hydrous mineral to do so. Metamorphic dehydration reactions are prominent within the subducting slab during subduction, giving rise to liquid phases that contain fluid-mobile trace elements due to the breakdown of hydrous minerals such as phengite, lawsonite and zoisite. This forms a unique type of trace element distribution pattern for arc magma. Arc magmas and the continental crust formed from arc magmas are enriched in boron, lead, arsenic, and antimony derived from the dehydration within the subducting slab. Hydrothermal fluids released from the slab mobilize these elements and allow them to be incorporated into arc magmas, distinguishing arc magmas from those produced at mid-ocean ridges and hotspots.

== Facies transitions and dehydration reactions of a subducting slab ==
=== Zeolite facies ===
Basalts may first metamorphose under zeolite facies conditions (50–150 °C and 1–5 km depth) during subduction. Zeolites are microporous silicate minerals that can be produced by the reaction of pore fluids with basalt and pelagic sediments. The zeolite facies conditions typically only affect pelitic sediments undergoing burial, but is commonly displayed by the production of zeolite minerals within the vesicles of vesicular basalt. The glassy rinds on pillow basalts are also susceptible to metamorphism under zeolite facies conditions, which produces the zeolites heulandite or stilbite and hydrous phyllosilicates such as celadonite, smectite, kaolinite, or montmorillonite plus secondary quartz. Crystalline igneous rocks of the subducting slab, such as gabbro and basaltic sheeted dikes, remain stable until greater depth, when the sodium endmember of plagioclase feldspar, albite, replaces detrital igneous plagioclase feldspar. Also at greater depth in the zeolite facies, the zeolite laumontite replaces the zeolite heulandite and the phyllosilicate chlorite is common.

=== Prehnite-pumpellyite facies ===
At paths up to 220–320 °C and below 4.5 kbars, subducting slabs may encounter the prehnite-pumpellyite facies, characterized by the presence of the hydrous chlorite, prehnite, albite, pumpellyite, tremolite, and epidote and the loss of the zeolites heulandite and laumontite. Actinolite may occur at higher grade. Aside from albite, these characteristic minerals are water bearing, and may contribute to mantle melting. These minerals are also vital in the formation of glaucophane, which is associated with blueschist facies. The onset of a low-pressure phase of lawsonite is the most significant marker of prehnite-pumpellyite facies metamorphism. The occurrence of lawsonite is significant because lawsonite contains 11 wt.% H_{2}O which is released at higher grade and can initiate significant melting.

Laumontite = Lawsonite + Quartz + H_{2}O

=== Blueschist facies ===
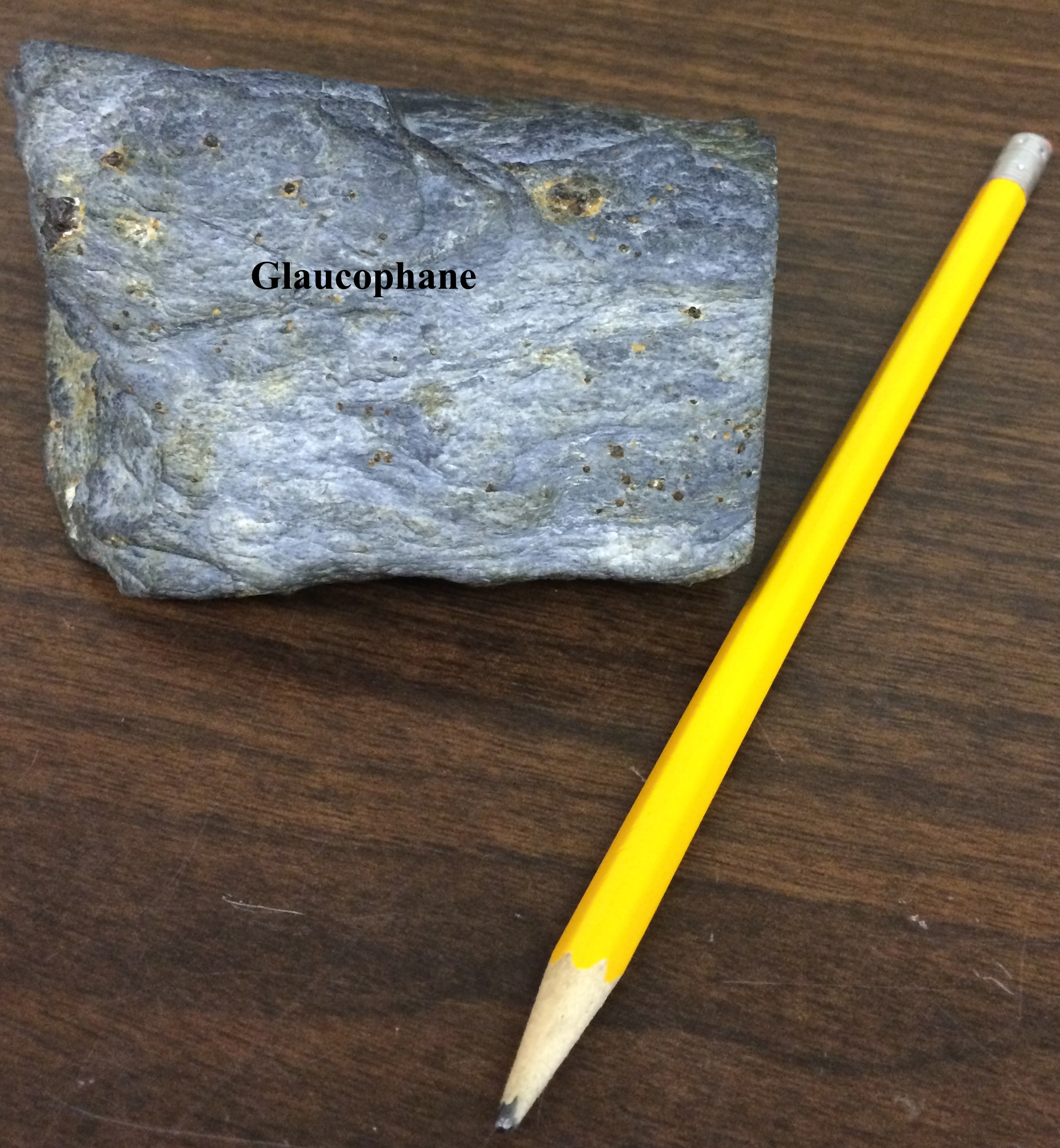
Blueschist containing the sodic blue amphibole, glaucophane

Blueschist facies is characterized by the formation of a sodic, blue amphibole, namely, glaucophane, for which the blueschist facies is named. Lawsonite is also diagnostic of blueschist facies and occurs in association with glaucophane. Glaucophane forming reactions are listed below. Glaucophane producing reactions are significant because they can either release water or produce the hydrous phase, lawsonite through the breakdown of hydrous phyllosilicates. At high blueschist facies pressures, albite may break down to form jadeite and quartz. Calcite will commonly pseudomorphose into aragonite under blueschist conditions. Other common minerals of blueschist facies metabasites are paragonite, chlorite, titanite, stilpnomelane, quartz, albite, sericite, and pumpellyite.

Tremolite + Chlorite + Albite = Glaucophane + Epidote + H_{2}O

Tremolite + Chlorite + Albite = Glaucophane + Lawsonite

Pumpellyite + Chlorite + Albite = Glaucophane + Epidote + H_{2}O

=== Eclogite facies ===
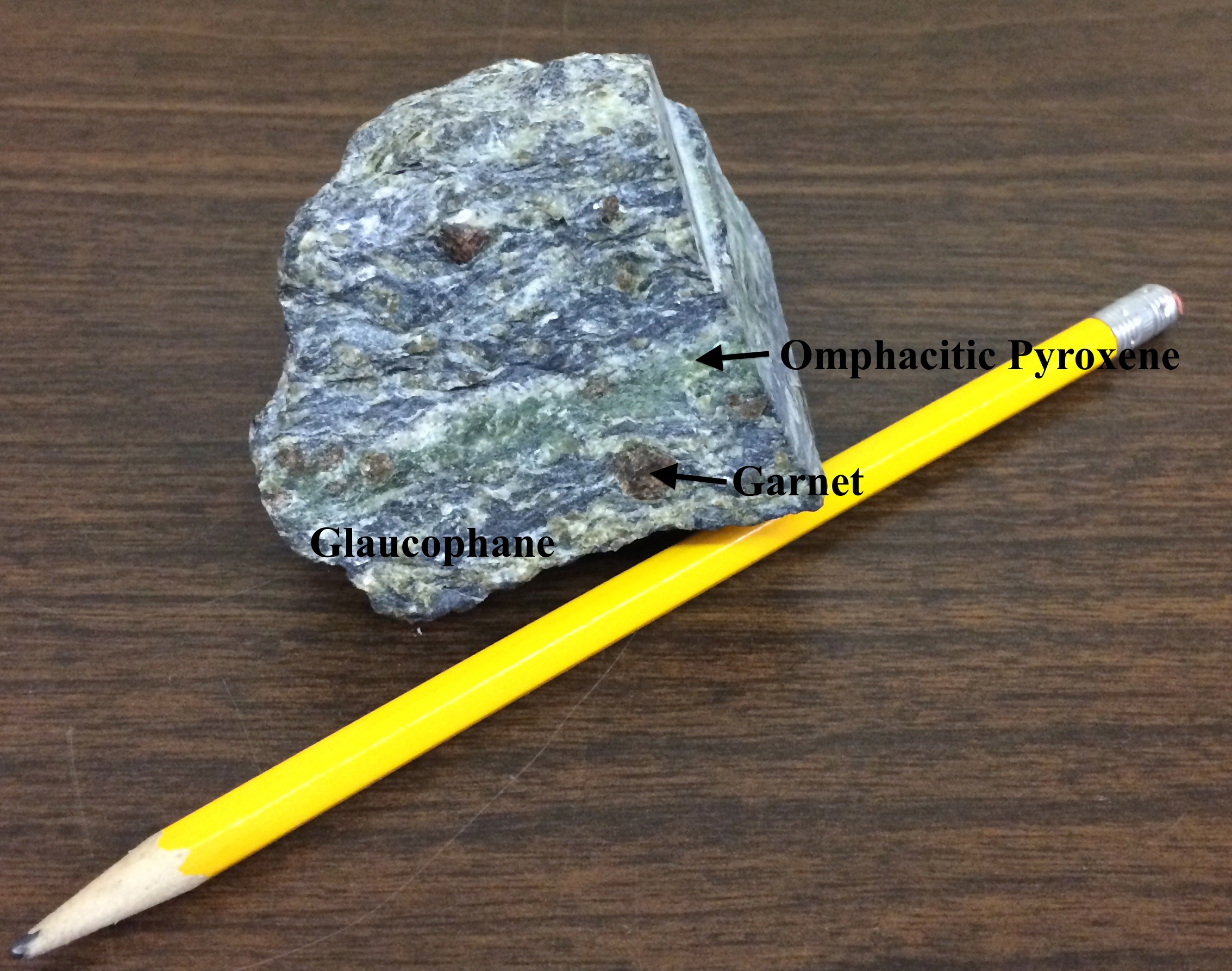
Transition from blueschist to eclogite facies rock, containing glaucophane, omphacitic pyroxene, and garnet

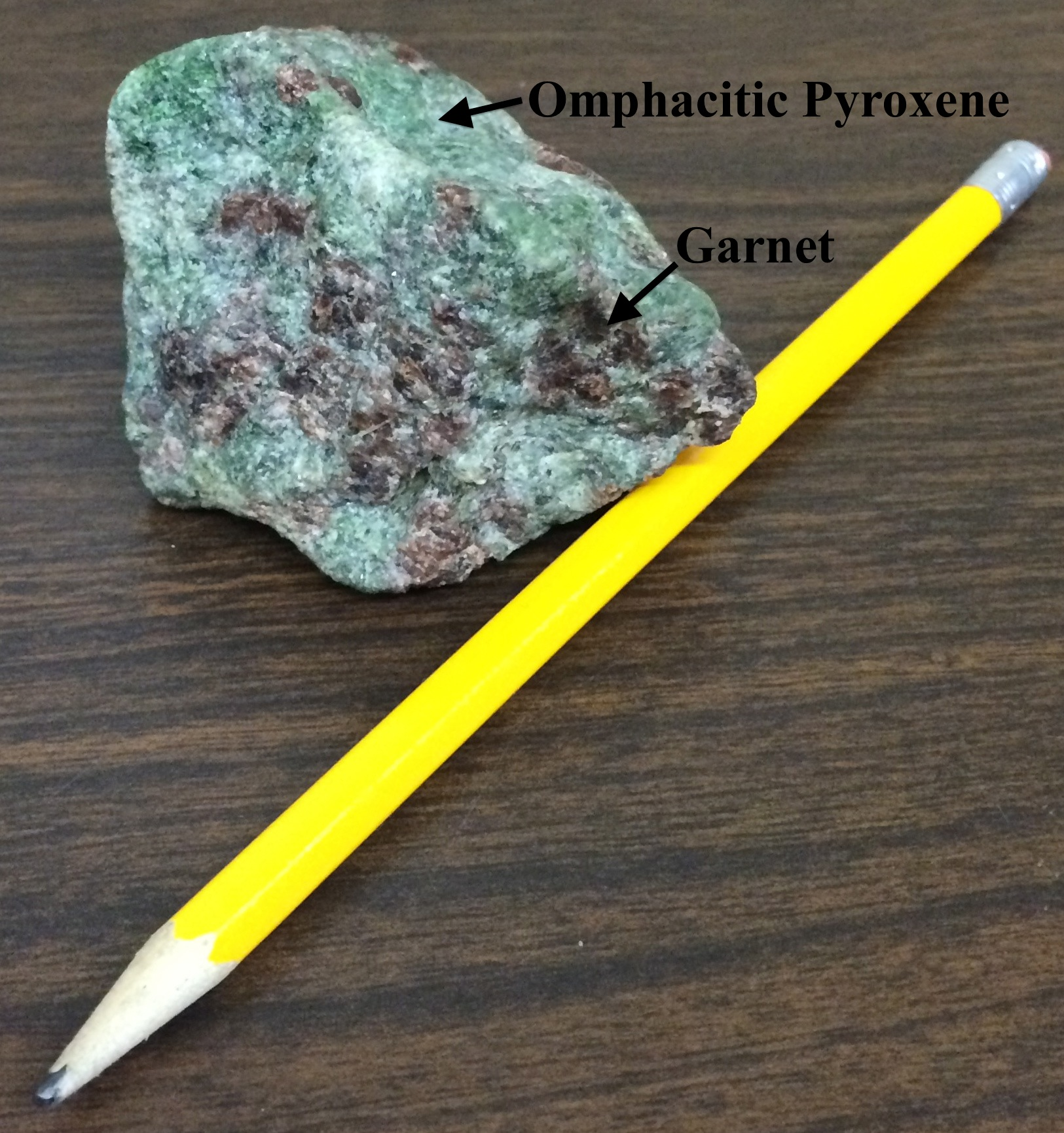
Eclogite facies rock, containing omphacitic pyroxene and garnet

Eclogite facies is typically encountered around 80–100 km depth and is characterized by the presence of green omphacitic pyroxene and red pyrope garnet. Omphacitic pyroxene is an augite-jadeite solution. At Eclogite facies conditions, plagioclase is no longer stable. The albite component breaks down during glaucophane producing reactions and its sodium becomes incorporated into glaucophane and pyroxene. This reaction is written below. The breakdown of glaucophane is an important water producing reaction at about 600 °C, and over 1 GPa that can trigger significant mantle melting and volcanism.

Glaucophane + Paragonite = Pyrope + Jadeite + Quartz + H_{2}O

Another important water producing reaction that occurs during the eclogite facies is the dehydration of the hydrous phyllosilicate phlogopite by the reaction below. This reaction can also trigger significant mantle melting and volcanism. Aside from triggering mantle melt, this reaction may also trigger partial melting of the subducting slab itself.

Phlogopite + Diopside + Orthopyroxene = H_{2}O + Melt

Lawsonite remains stable up to 1080 °C and 9.4 GPa. The breakdown of lawsonite releases massive amounts of H_{2}O into the mantle that can trigger partial melting of the slab and of the overlying mantle. The breakdown reaction of lawsonite is listed below.

Lawsonite = Grossular + Topaz + Stishovite + H_{2}O

Antigorite Serpentine is another important water bearing phase that breaks down at eclogite facies conditions. Antigorite breaks down at 600–700 °C and between 2–5 GPa. Antigorite contains 13 wt.% water and therefore causes substantial mantle melting. The reaction is listed below.

Antigorite = Forsterite + Enstatite + H_{2}O

Transition into the eclogite facies is proposed to be the source of earthquakes at depths greater than 70 km. These earthquakes are caused by the contraction of the slab as minerals transition into more compact crystal structures. The depth of these earthquakes on the subducting slab is known as the Wadati–Benioff zone.

== Paired metamorphic belts ==
Paired metamorphic belts were envisaged as a set of parallel metamorphic rock units parallel to a subduction zone displaying two contrasting metamorphic conditions and thus two distinctive mineral assemblages. Nearest to the trench is a zone of low temperature, high pressure metamorphic conditions characterized by blueschist to eclogite facies assemblages. This assemblage is associated with subduction along the trench and low heat flow. Nearest the arc is a zone of high temperature-low pressure metamorphic conditions characterized by amphibolite to granulite facies mineral assemblages such as aluminosilicates, cordierite, and orthopyroxenes. This assemblage is associated with high heat flow generated by melting beneath the volcanic arc.

However, further studies show the common occurrence of paired metamorphic belts in continental interiors, resulting in controversy on their origin. Based on inspection of extreme metamorphism and post-subduction magmatism at convergent plate margins, paired metamorphic belts are further extended to two contrasting metamorphic facies series: one is blueschist to eclogite facies series that was produced by subducting metamorphism at low thermal gradients of <10 °C/km, and the other is amphibolite to granulite facies series that was produced by rifting metamorphism at high thermal gradients of >30 °C/km.
