= Geology of Curaçao =

The island of Curaçao began to form within the past 145 million years, beginning in the Cretaceous, as part of the Lesser Antilles island arc. Because the island was submerged for large parts of its history, reef environments formed atop thick layers of mafic volcanic rock, producing carbonate sedimentary rocks.

== Stratigraphy and geologic history ==
The five kilometer thick Curaçao Lava Formation is the oldest rock unit on Curaçao, dating to the Cretaceous. The formation includes pillow basalt formed when lava rapidly cooled in seawater, hyaloclastites, one kilometer of picrate basalts, thin layers of sedimentary rock and dolerite sills. Most of the rock originated from tholeiitic magma series, formed from the shallow melting of the mantle and are very similar to the Mid-Ocean Ridge Basalt, although much thicker more akin to an oceanic plateau. The formation is intruded by calc-alkaline diorite. An unconformity separates the Curaçao Lava Formation from the Knip Group, which includes the Zevenbergen limestone and Casabao limestone laden with fossilized foraminifera, crinoids, rudists, corals and gastropods from the Late Cretaceous. The formation is two kilometers thick in the west but only 100 meters thick in the southeast.

In the northwest, mudstones, breccia and boulder beds in the Knip Group grade into the Seroe Gracia Formation, which has 300 meters of chert limestone. This formation is overlain by 750 meters of sandstone, siltstone, mudstone and marl in the Lagoen Formation.

=== Cenozoic (66 million years ago-present) ===
The Midden Curaçao Formation probably formed in the Paleocene based on poorly preserved foraminifera fossils. There is an unconformity between Cretaceous rocks and this formation, which includes remnants of submarine fan deposits along with andesite metamorphosed to greenschist grade. Parts of the formation date to the Eocene, while the upper units formed in the Oligocene. Together with the Knip Group, the Midden Curaçao Formation is intruded by intermediate igneous rocks, which caused contact metamorphism up to zeolite grade on the sequence of metamorphic facies. The veins also contain laumontite, prehnite, chlorite, albite, pumpellyite and calcite.

The Mainsjie Formation is poorly exposed at the surface, but includes calcareous sands, conglomerates, 10 meters thick that outcrops in eastern Curaçao. The Seroe Domi Formation is an accumulation of pebble and reef debris that also originated from a submarine fan, that outcrops as cliffs near Willemstad. Five limestone terraces formed during the past 2.5 million years of the Quaternary.
