= Julgoldite =

Silicate mineral

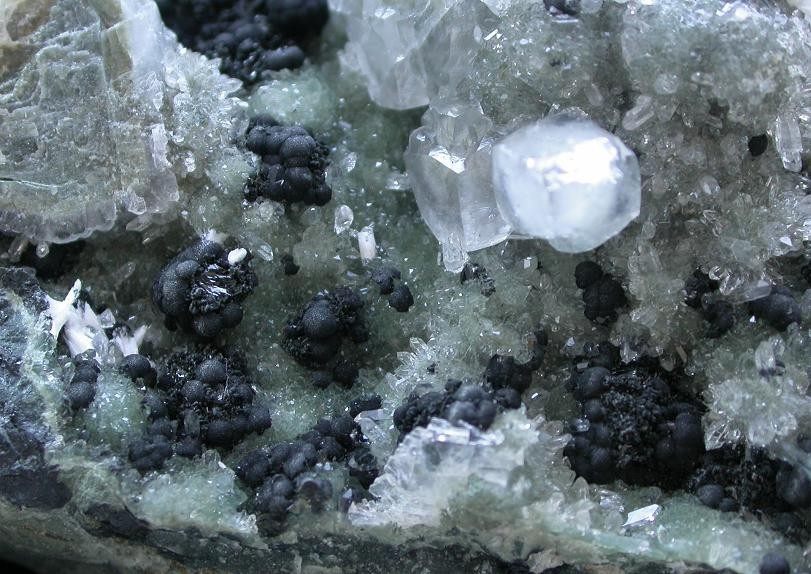
- Black spheres of Julgoldite-(Fe^{2+})

General
- Category: Sorosilicates
- Formula: (Ca,Mn)_{2}(Fe^{2+},Fe^{3+},Mg)(Fe^{3+},Al)_{2}(SiO_{4})(Si_{2}O_{7})(OH)_{2}·(H_{2}O)
- IMA symbol: Jul
- Strunz classification: 9.BG.20
- Crystal system: Monoclinic (Julgoldit-(Mg) unknown)
- Crystal class: Prismatic (2/m) (same H-M symbol)
- Space group: A2/m

Identification
- Color: Black to greenish olive
- Crystal habit: blades or prisms.
- Cleavage: [100] Good
- Mohs scale hardness: 4.5
- Luster: sub-metallic
- Streak: greenish olive
- Specific gravity: 3.6
- Optical properties: Biaxial (−)
- Refractive index: nα=1.776 nβ=1.814 nγ=1.836
- Birefringence: δ = 0.0600
- Fusibility: loses water

Julgoldite is a member of the pumpellyite mineral series, a series of minerals characterized by the chemical bonding of silica tetrahedra with alkali and transition metal cations. Julgoldites, along with more common minerals like epidote and vesuvianite, belong to the subclass of sorosilicates, the rock-forming minerals that contain SiO_{4} tetrahedra that share a common oxygen to form Si_{2}O_{7} ions with a charge of 6− (Deer et al., 1996). Julgoldite has been recognized for its importance in low grade metamorphism, forming under shear stress accompanied by relatively low temperatures (Coombs, 1953). Julgoldite was named in honor of Professor Julian Royce Goldsmith (1918–1999) of the University of Chicago.

== Composition ==
The chemical formula of julgoldite is (Ca,Mn)_{2}(Fe^{2+},Fe^{3+},Mg)(Fe^{3+},Al)_{2}(SiO_{4})(Si_{2}O_{7})(OH)_{2}·(H_{2}O) (Moore, 1971). Pumpellyites are classified according to the prevailing metals in the X and Y sites (Moore, 1971). When Mg in the X position and Al in the Y position and both occupy greater than 50% molarities of their positions, then the mineral is identified as a pumpellyite (Moore, 1971). Julgoldites are identified when Fe^{2+} in the X and Fe^{3+} in the Y each occupy greater than 50% molarity of their positions (Moore, 1971).

== Geologic occurrence ==
Julgoldites were first collected as samples entrenched in large plates of apophyllite and barite, comprising a fissure inside granular hematite-magnetite ore in Långban, Sweden (Moore, 1971). Julgoldite has since been discovered in other parts of the world: Edinburgh, Scotland (in quartz dolerite) (Livingstone, 1976) and Norilsk, Taymyr Peninsula, Russia, one of the largest nickel deposits in the world, in metamorphosed basalts and diabases associated with prehnite and laumontite (Zolotukin et al., 1965). Julgoldite has also been found exposed in basalt cavities in the Khondivili Quarry near Bombay, India along with other silicates, including pumpellyite-Fe^{2+}, ilvaite, babingtonite, hydroandradite, prehnite, and chlorite (Wise and Moller, 1990). These minerals crystallized in the same basaltic cavities, which were primarily formed from gas bubbles in the compound lava flows; all of these Ca-Fe silicates formed in different phases of a low temperature environment (Wise and Moller, 1990).

== Atomic structure ==
The atomic structures of pumpellyites and julgoldites consist of chains of edge-sharing octahedra linked by SiO_{4}, Si_{2}O_{7}, and CaO_{7} polyhedra: in the julgoldite atomic structure, the Ca site, the W site, is a seven-coordinated site with oxygen; the X and Y are two crystallographically independent octahedral sites; and the SiO_{4} site is tetrahedral (Passaglia and Gottardi, 1973). Like epidote, for which the chemical formula is Ca_{2}(Fe^{3+},Al)Al_{2}(SiO_{4})(Si_{2}O_{7})(OH), julgoldite contains additional SiO_{4} tetrahedra that are independent of the Si_{2}O_{7} structural units (Deer et al., 1996). The octahedral sites form chains along the b axis by sharing opposite edges (Allman and Donnay, 1973). The octahedral chains are joined in the ac plane by SiO_{4} and Si_{2}O_{6} (OH) groups, forming five-member rings of two octahedra and three tetrahedral (Allman and Donnay, 1973). Half of the rings are open ended and have a Ca^{2+} ion in their center; the other rings are closed, and they surround a Ca2+ ion (Allman and Donnay, 1973). The X and Y chains are parallel to the crystallographic direction [010]; therefore, the two edge sharing polyhedra cause variations in the b cell parameter (Artioli et al., 2003). Two layers of X chains and one layer of Y chains occur along the [100] direction, whereas two layers of both X and Y chains occur along the [001] direction (Artioli et al., 2003).

== Physical properties ==
Moore (1971) sampled flat prismatic or bladed crystals, with the greatest dimension of each mineral to be no more than 2mm. The julgoldites found in the basalt cavities in India were almost 10 mm in length (Wise and Moller, 1990). Julgoldite is elongated parallel b [010] and flattened parallel a {100} (Moore, 1971). Allman and Donnay (1973) calculated the cell dimensions to be a 8.922(4), b 6.081(3), c 19.432 (9) Å. The color of julgoldite is usually a deep lustrous black, and it has a hardness of 4.5 and cleavage on the a-axis {100} (Moore, 1971). It has a greenish-olive powdery streak with a blue tinge (Moore, 1971). Under the petrographic microscope, a thin section of the mineral will display brilliant interference figures in greens or blues (Moore, 1971). The mineral is classified under the space group A2/m (Moore, 1971). A monoclinic mineral, julgoldite is isostructural to pumpellyite and epidote (Allman and Donnay, 1973).
