= Metamorphic rock =

Rock that was subjected to heat and pressure

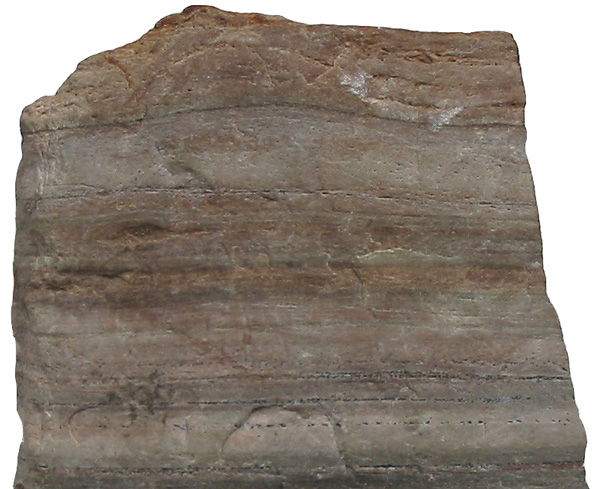
Quartzite, a type of metamorphic rock

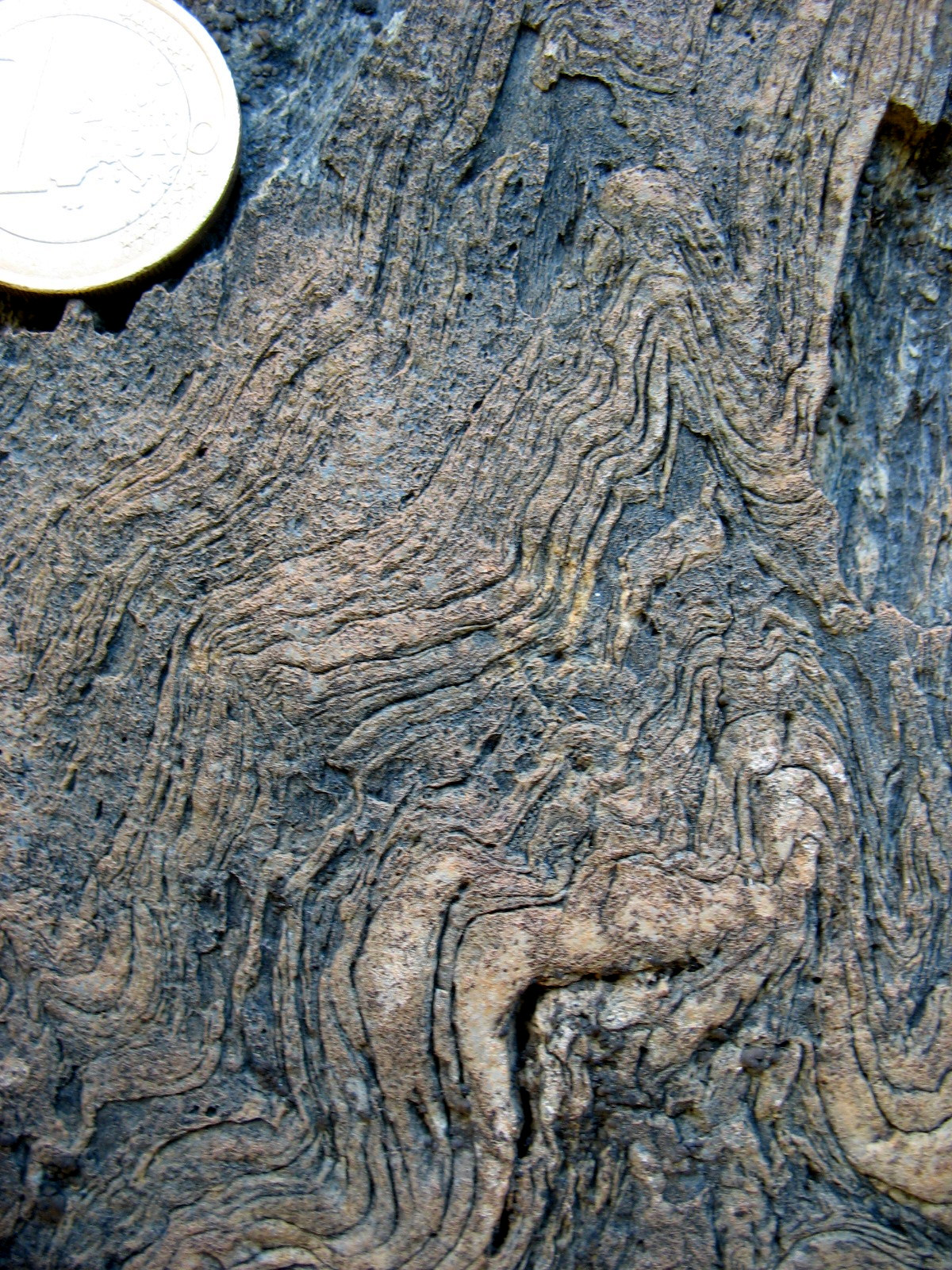
Metamorphic rock, deformed during the Variscan orogeny, at Vall de Cardós, Lérida, Spain

Metamorphic rocks arise from the transformation of existing rock to new types of rock in a process called metamorphism. The original rock (protolith) is subjected to temperatures greater than 150 to 200 °C (300 to 400 °F) and, often, elevated pressure of 100 megapascals (1,000 bar) or more, causing profound physical or chemical changes. During this process, the rock remains mostly in the solid state, but gradually recrystallizes to a new texture or mineral composition. The protolith may be an igneous, sedimentary, or existing metamorphic rock.

Metamorphic rocks make up a large part of the Earth's crust and form 12% of the Earth's land surface. They are classified by their protolith, their chemical and mineral makeup, and their texture. They may be formed simply by being deeply buried beneath the Earth's surface, where they are subject to high temperatures and the great pressure of the rock layers above. They can also form from tectonic processes such as continental collisions, which cause horizontal pressure, friction, and distortion. Metamorphic rock can be formed locally when rock is heated by the intrusion of hot molten rock called magma from the Earth's interior. The study of metamorphic rocks (now exposed at the Earth's surface following erosion and uplift) provides information about the temperatures and pressures that occur at great depths within the Earth's crust.

Some examples of metamorphic rocks are gneiss, slate, marble, schist, and quartzite. Slate and quartzite tiles are used in building construction. Marble is also prized for building construction and as a medium for sculpture. On the other hand, schist bedrock can pose a challenge for civil engineering because of its pronounced planes of weakness.

== Origin ==
Metamorphic rocks form one of the three great divisions of rock types. They are distinguished from igneous rocks, which form from molten magma, and sedimentary rocks, which form from sediments eroded from existing rock or precipitated chemically or physically from bodies of water.

Metamorphic rocks are formed when existing rock is transformed physically or chemically at elevated temperature, without actually melting to any great degree. The importance of heating in the formation of metamorphic rock was first noted by the pioneering Scottish naturalist, James Hutton, who is often described as the father of modern geology. Hutton wrote in 1795 that some rock beds of the Scottish Highlands had originally been sedimentary rock but had been transformed by great heat.

Hutton also speculated that pressure was important in metamorphism. This hypothesis was tested by his friend, James Hall, who sealed chalk into a makeshift pressure vessel constructed from a cannon barrel and heated it in an iron foundry furnace. Hall found that this produced a material strongly resembling marble, rather than the usual quicklime produced by heating of chalk in the open air. French geologists subsequently added metasomatism, the circulation of fluids through buried rock, to the list of processes that help bring about metamorphism. However, metamorphism can take place without metasomatism (isochemical metamorphism) or at depths of just a few hundred meters where pressures are relatively low (for example, in contact metamorphism).

=== Mineralogical changes ===
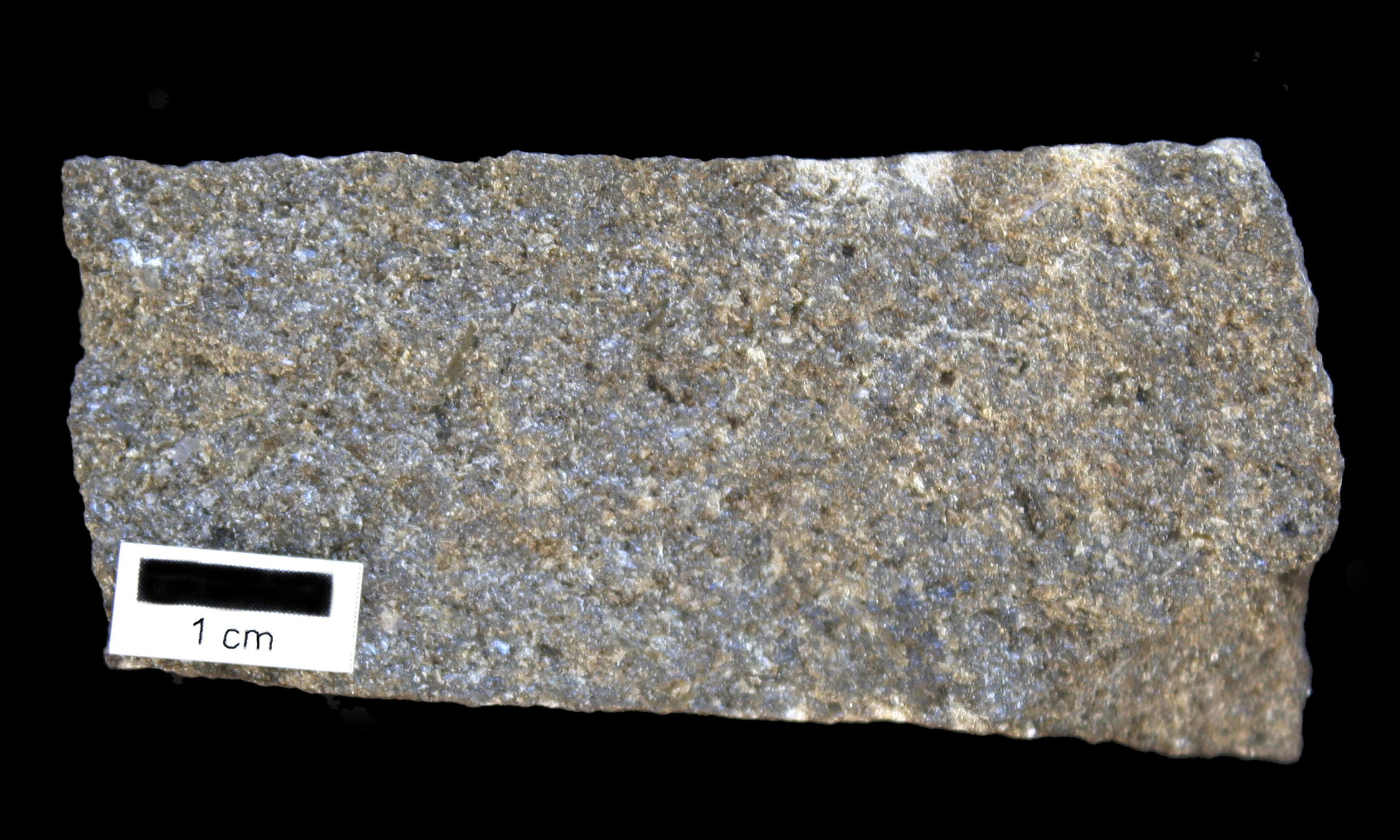
Basalt hand-sized sample showing fine-grained texture

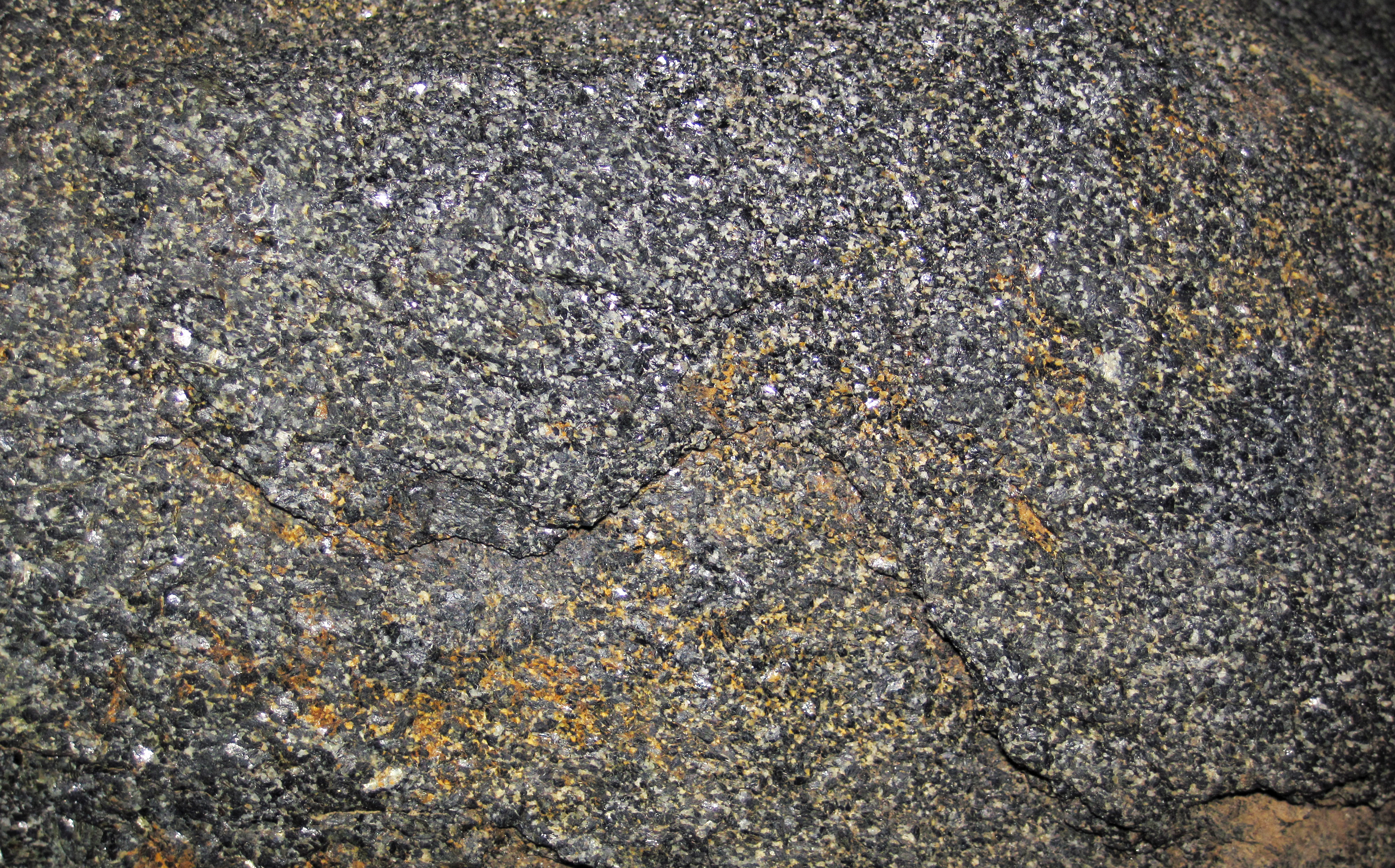
Amphibolite formed by metamorphism of basalt

Metasomatism can change the bulk composition of a rock. Hot fluids circulating through pore space in the rock can dissolve existing minerals and precipitate new minerals. Dissolved substances are transported out of the rock by the fluids while new substances are brought in by fresh fluids. This can obviously change the mineral makeup of the rock.

However, changes in the mineral composition can take place even when the bulk composition of the rock does not change. This is possible because all minerals are stable only within certain limits of temperature, pressure, and chemical environment. For example, at atmospheric pressure, the mineral kyanite transforms to andalusite at a temperature of about 190 °C (374 °F). Andalusite, in turn, transforms to sillimanite when the temperature reaches about 800 °C (1,470 °F). All three have the identical composition, Al_{2}SiO_{5}. Likewise, forsterite is stable over a broad range of pressure and temperature in marble, but is converted to pyroxene at elevated pressure and temperature in more silicate-rich rock containing plagioclase, with which the forsterite reacts chemically.

Many complex high-temperature reactions may take place between minerals without them melting, and each mineral assemblage produced indicates the temperatures and pressures at the time of metamorphism. These reactions are possible because of rapid diffusion of atoms at elevated temperature. Pore fluid between mineral grains can be an important medium through which atoms are exchanged.

=== Textural changes ===
The change in the particle size of the rock during the process of metamorphism is called recrystallization. For instance, the small calcite crystals in the sedimentary rock limestone and chalk change into larger crystals in the metamorphic rock marble. In metamorphosed sandstone, recrystallization of the original quartz sand grains results in very compact quartzite, also known as metaquartzite, in which the often larger quartz crystals are interlocked. Both high temperatures and pressures contribute to recrystallization. High temperatures allow the atoms and ions in solid crystals to migrate, thus reorganizing the crystals, while high pressures cause solution of the crystals within the rock at their point of contact.

== Description ==
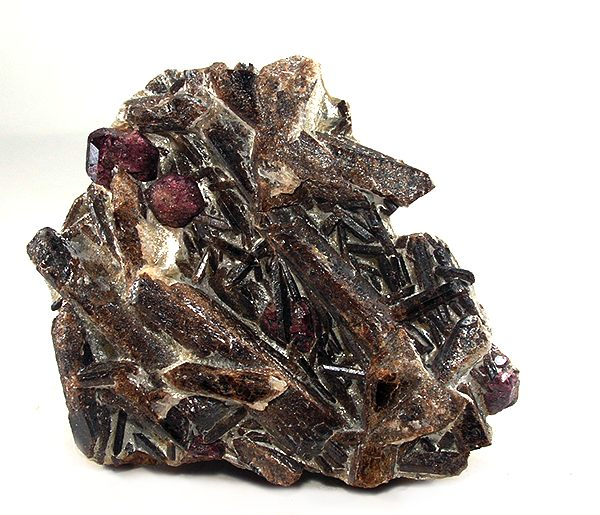
Metamorphic rock containing staurolite and almandine garnet

Metamorphic rocks are characterized by their distinctive mineral composition and texture.

=== Metamorphic minerals ===
Because every mineral is stable only within certain limits, the presence of certain minerals in metamorphic rocks indicates the approximate temperatures and pressures at which the rock underwent metamorphism. These minerals are known as index minerals. Examples include sillimanite, kyanite, staurolite, andalusite, and some garnet.

Other minerals, such as olivines, pyroxenes, hornblende, micas, feldspars, and quartz, may be found in metamorphic rocks but are not necessarily the result of the process of metamorphism. These minerals can also form during the crystallization of igneous rocks. They are stable at high temperatures and pressures and may remain chemically unchanged during the metamorphic process.

=== Texture ===
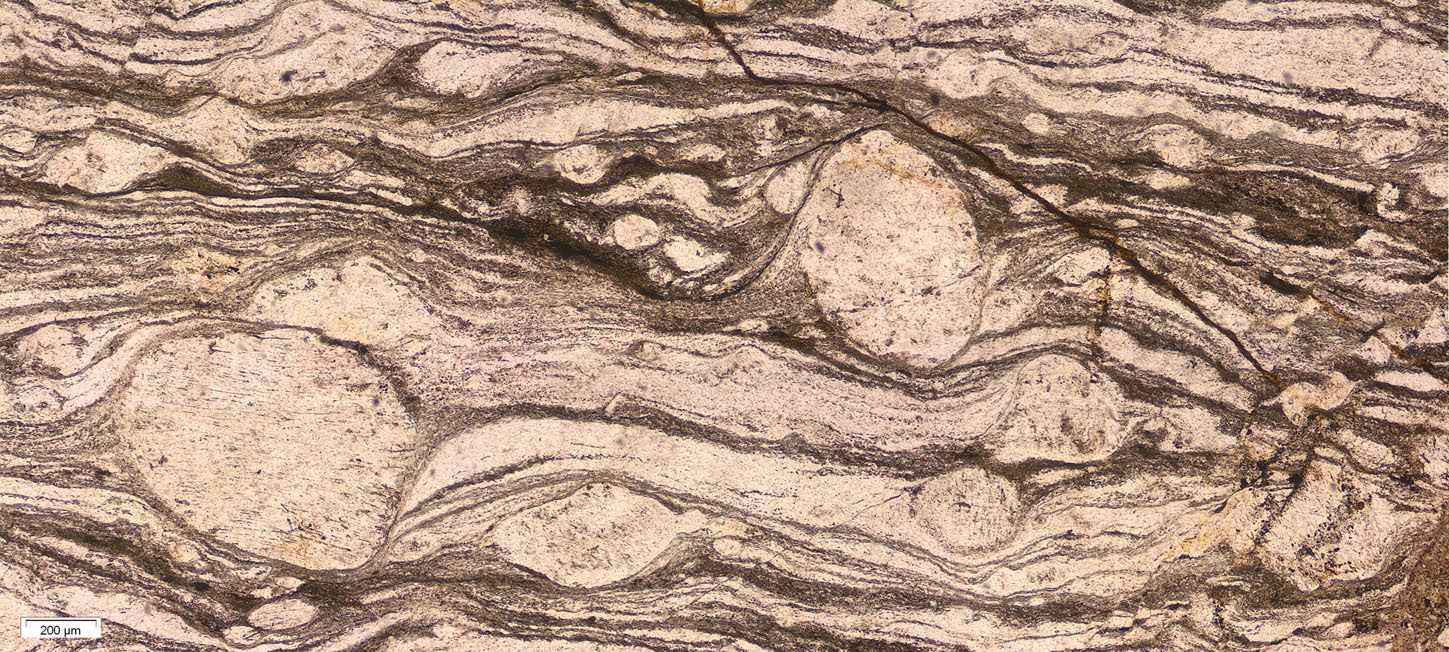
A mylonite (through a petrographic microscope)

Metamorphic rocks are typically more coarsely crystalline than the protolith from which they formed. Atoms in the interior of a crystal are surrounded by a stable arrangement of neighboring atoms. This is partially missing at the surface of the crystal, producing a surface energy that makes the surface thermodynamically unstable. Recrystallization to coarser crystals reduces the surface area and so minimizes the surface energy.

Although grain coarsening is a common result of metamorphism, rock that is intensely deformed may eliminate strain energy by recrystallizing as a fine-grained rock called mylonite. Certain kinds of rock, such as those rich in quartz, carbonate minerals, or olivine, are particularly prone to form mylonites, while feldspar and garnet are resistant to mylonitization.

=== Foliation ===
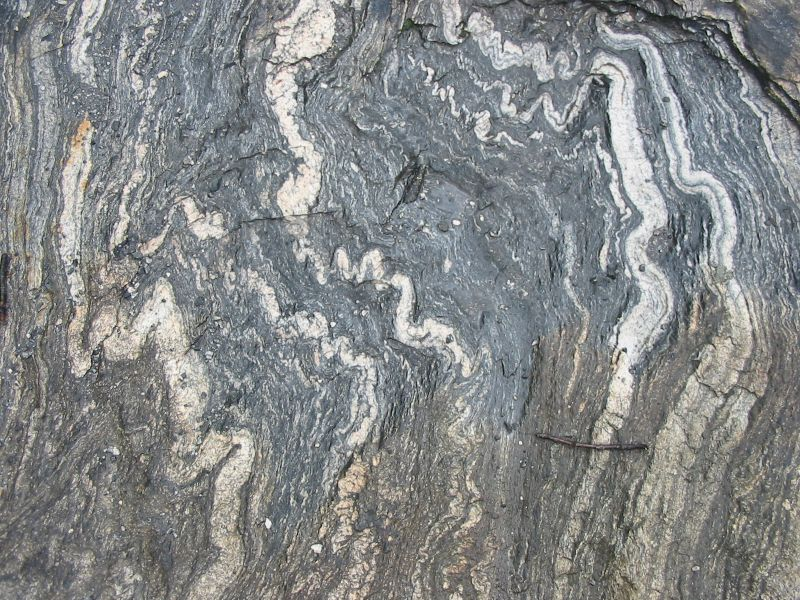
Folded foliation in a metamorphic rock from near Geirangerfjord, Norway

Many kinds of metamorphic rocks show a distinctive layering called foliation (derived from the Latin word folia, meaning "leaves"). Foliation develops when a rock is being shortened along one axis during recrystallization. This causes crystals of platy minerals, such as mica and chlorite, to become rotated such that their short axes are parallel to the direction of shortening. This results in a banded, or foliated, rock, with the bands showing the colors of the minerals that formed them. Foliated rock often develops planes of cleavage. Slate is an example of a foliated metamorphic rock, originating from shale, and it typically shows well-developed cleavage that allows slate to be split into thin plates.

The type of foliation that develops depends on the metamorphic grade. For instance, starting with a mudstone, the following sequence develops with increasing temperature: The mudstone is first converted to slate, which is a very fine-grained, foliated metamorphic rock, characteristic of very low grade metamorphism. Slate in turn is converted to phyllite, which is fine-grained and found in areas of low grade metamorphism. Schist is medium to coarse-grained and found in areas of medium grade metamorphism. High-grade metamorphism transforms the rock to gneiss, which is coarse to very coarse-grained.

Rocks that were subjected to uniform pressure from all sides, or those that lack minerals with distinctive growth habits, will not be foliated. Marble lacks platy minerals and is generally not foliated, which allows its use as a material for sculpture and architecture.

=== Classification ===
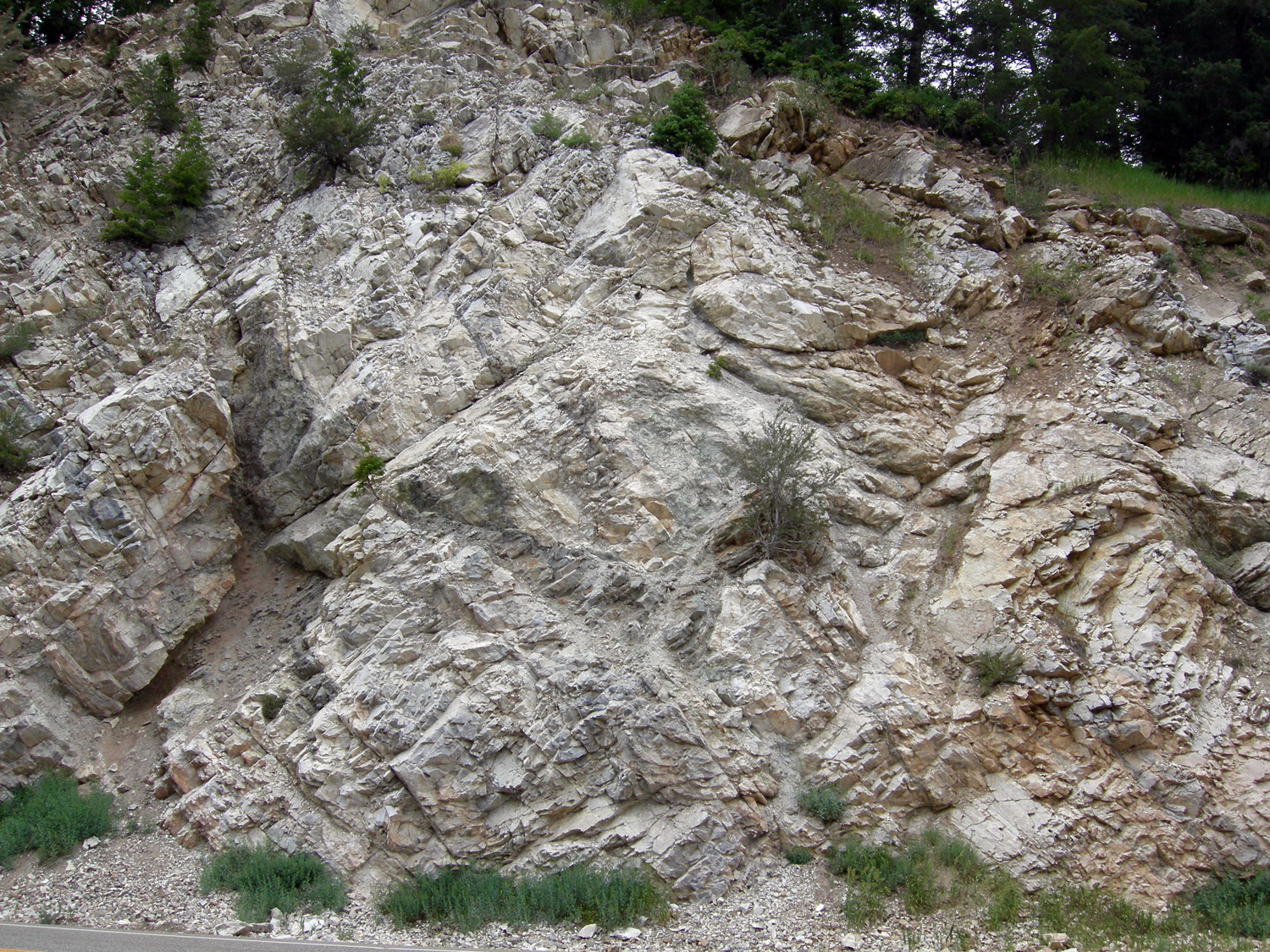
Mississippian marble in Big Cottonwood Canyon, Wasatch Mountains, Utah

Metamorphic rocks are one of the three great divisions of all rock types, and so there is a great variety of metamorphic rock types. In general, if the protolith of a metamorphic rock can be determined, the rock is described by adding the prefix meta- to the protolith rock name. For example, if the protolith is known to be basalt, the rock will be described as a metabasalt. Likewise, a metamorphic rock whose protolith is known to be a conglomerate will be described as a metaconglomerate. For a metamorphic rock to be classified in this manner, the protolith should be identifiable from the characteristics of the metamorphic rock itself, and not inferred from other information.

Under the British Geological Survey's classification system, if all that can be determined about the protolith is its general type, such as sedimentary or volcanic, the classification is based on the mineral mode (the volume percentages of different minerals in the rock). Metasedimentary rocks are divided into carbonate-rich rock (metacarbonates or calcsilicate-rocks) or carbonate-poor rocks, and the latter are further classified by the relative abundance of mica in their composition. This ranges from low-mica psammite through semipelite to high-mica pelite. Psammites composed mostly of quartz are classified as quartzite. Metaigneous rocks are classified similarly to igneous rocks, by silica content, from meta-ultramafic-rock (which is very low in silica) to metafelsic-rock (with a high silica content).

Where the mineral mode cannot be determined, as is often the case when rock is first examined in the field, then classification must be based on texture. The textural types are:

- Schists, which are medium-grained strongly foliated rocks. These show the most well-developed schistosity, defined as the extent to which platy minerals are present and are aligned in a single direction, so that the rock easily splits into plates less than a centimeter (0.4 inches) thick.
- Gneisses, which are more coarse grained and show thicker foliation than schists, with layers over 5mm thick. These show less well-developed schistosity.
- Granofels, which show no obvious foliation or schistosity.

A hornfels is a granofels that is known to result from contact metamorphism. A slate is a fine-grained metamorphic rock that easily splits into thin plates but shows no obvious compositional layering. The term is used only when very little else is known about the rock that would allow a more definite classification. Textural classifications may be prefixed to indicate a sedimentary protolith (para-, such as paraschist) or igneous protolith (ortho-, such as orthogneiss). When nothing is known about the protolith, the textural name is used without a prefix. For example, a schist is a rock with schistose texture whose protolith is uncertain.

Special classifications exist for metamorphic rocks with a volcaniclastic protolith or formed along a fault or through hydrothermal circulation. A few special names are used for rocks of unknown protolith but known modal composition, such as marble, eclogite, or amphibolite. Special names may also be applied more generally to rocks dominated by a single mineral, or with a distinctive composition or mode or origin. Special names still in wide use include amphibolite, greenschist, phyllite, marble, serpentinite, eclogite, migmatite, skarn, granulite, mylonite, and slate.

The basic classification can be supplemented by terms describing mineral content or texture. For example, a metabasalt showing weak schistosity might be described as a gneissic metabasalt, and a pelite containing abundant staurolite might be described as a staurolite pelite.

==== Metamorphic facies ====
A metamorphic facies is a set of distinctive assemblages of minerals that are found in metamorphic rock that formed under a specific combination of pressure and temperature. The particular assemblage is somewhat dependent on the composition of that protolith, so that (for example) the amphibolite facies of a marble will not be identical with the amphibolite facies of a pelite. However, the facies are defined such that metamorphic rock with as broad a range of compositions as is practical can be assigned to a particular facies. The present definition of metamorphic facies is largely based on the work of the Finnish geologist, Pentti Eskola, with refinements based on subsequent experimental work. Eskola drew upon the zonal schemes, based on index minerals, that were pioneered by the British geologist, George Barrow.

Figure 1. Diagram showing metamorphic facies in pressure-temperature space. The domain of the graph corresponds to conditions within the Earth's crust and upper mantle.

The metamorphic facies is not usually considered when classifying metamorphic rock based on protolith, mineral mode, or texture. However, a few metamorphic facies produce rock of such distinctive character that the facies name is used for the rock when more precise classification is not possible. The chief examples are amphibolite and eclogite. The British Geological Survey strongly discourages the use of granulite as a classification for rock metamorphosed to the granulite facies. Instead, such rock will often be classified as a granofels. However, this approach is not universally accepted.

== Occurrence ==
Metamorphic rocks make up a large part of the Earth's crust and form 12% of the Earth's land surface. The lower continental crust is mostly metamafic rock and pelite which have reached the granulite facies. The middle continental crust is dominated by metamorphic rock that has reached the amphibolite facies. Within the upper crust, which is the only part of the Earth's crust geologists can directly sample, metamorphic rock forms only from processes that can occur at shallow depth. These are contact (thermal) metamorphism, dynamic (cataclastic) metamorphism, hydrothermal metamorphism, and impact metamorphism. These processes are relatively local in occurrence and usually reach only the low-pressure facies, such as the hornfels and sanidinite facies. Most metamorphic rock is formed by regional metamorphism in the middle and lower crust, where the rock reaches the higher-pressure metamorphic facies. This rock is found at the surface only where extensive uplift and erosion has exhumed rock that was formerly much deeper in the crust.

=== Orogenic belts ===
Metamorphic rock is extensively exposed in orogenic belts produced by the collision of tectonic plates at convergent boundaries. Here formerly deeply buried rock has been brought to the surface by uplift and erosion. The metamorphic rock exposed in orogenic belts may have been metamorphosed simply by being at great depths below the Earth's surface, subjected to high temperatures and the great pressure caused by the immense weight of the rock layers above. This kind of regional metamorphism is known as burial metamorphism. This tends to produce low-grade metamorphic rock. Much more common is metamorphic rock formed during the collision process itself. The collision of plates causes high temperatures, pressures and deformation in the rocks along these belts. Metamorphic rock formed in these settings tends to show well-developed schistosity.

Metamorphic rock of orogenic belts shows a variety of metamorphic facies. Where subduction is taking place, the basalt of the subducting slab is metamorphosed to high-pressure metamorphic facies. It initially undergoes low-grade metamorphism to metabasalt of the zeolite and prehnite-pumpellyite facies, but as the basalt subducts to greater depths, it is metamorphosed to the blueschist facies and then the eclogite facies. Metamorphism to the eclogite facies releases a great deal of water vapor from the rock, which drives volcanism in the overlying volcanic arc. Eclogite is also significantly denser than blueschist, which drives further subduction of the slab deep into the Earth's mantle. Metabasalt and blueschist may be preserved in blueschist metamorphic belts formed by collisions between continents. They may also be preserved by obduction onto the overriding plate as part of ophiolites. Eclogites are occasionally found at sites of continental collision, where the subducted rock is rapidly brought back to the surface, before it can be converted to the granulite facies in the hot upper mantle. Many samples of eclogite are xenoliths brought to the surface by volcanic activity.

Many orogenic belts contain higher-temperature, lower-pressure metamorphic belts. These may form through heating of the rock by ascending magmas of volcanic arcs, but on a regional scale. Deformation and crustal thickening in an orogenic belt may also produce these kinds of metamorphic rocks. These rocks reach the greenschist, amphibolite, or granulite facies and are the most common of metamorphic rocks produced by regional metamorphosis. The association of an outer high-pressure, low-temperature metamorphic zone with an inner zone of low-pressure, high-temperature metamorphic rocks is called a paired metamorphic belt. The main islands of Japan show three distinct paired metamorphic belts, corresponding to different episodes of subduction.

=== Metamorphic core complexes ===
Metamorphic rock is also exposed in metamorphic core complexes, which form in region of crustal extension. They are characterized by low-angle faulting that exposes domes of middle or lower crust metamorphic rock. These were first recognized and studied in the Basin and Range Province of southwestern North America, but are also found in southern Aegean Sea, in the D'Entrecasteaux Islands, and in other areas of extension.

=== Granite-greenstone belts ===
Continental shields are regions of exposed ancient rock that make up the stable cores of continents. The rock exposed in the oldest regions of shields, which is of Archean age (over 2500 million years old), mostly belong to granite-greenstone belts. The greenstone belts contain metavolcanic and metasedimentary rock that has undergone a relatively mild grade of metamorphism, at temperatures of 350–500 °C (662–932 °F) and pressures of 200–500 MPa (2,000–5,000 bar). They can be divided into a lower group of metabasalts, including rare metakomatiites; a middle group of meta-intermediate-rock and meta-felsic-rock; and an upper group of metasedimentary rock.

The greenstone belts are surrounded by high-grade gneiss terrains showing highly deformed low-pressure, high-temperature (over 500 °C (932 °F)) metamorphism to the amphibolite or granulite facies. These form most of the exposed rock in Archean cratons.

The granite-greenstone belts are intruded by a distinctive group of granitic rocks called the tonalite-trondhjemite-granodiorite or TTG suite. These are the most voluminous rocks in the craton and may represent an important early phase in the formation of continental crust.

=== Mid-ocean ridges ===
Mid-ocean ridges are where new oceanic crust is formed as tectonic plates move apart. Hydrothermal metamorphism is extensive here. This is characterized by metasomatism by hot fluids circulating through the rock. This produces metamorphic rock of the greenschist facies. The metamorphic rock, serpentinite, is particularly characteristic of these settings, and represents chemical transformation of olivine and pyroxene in ultramafic rock to serpentine group minerals.

=== Contact aureoles ===
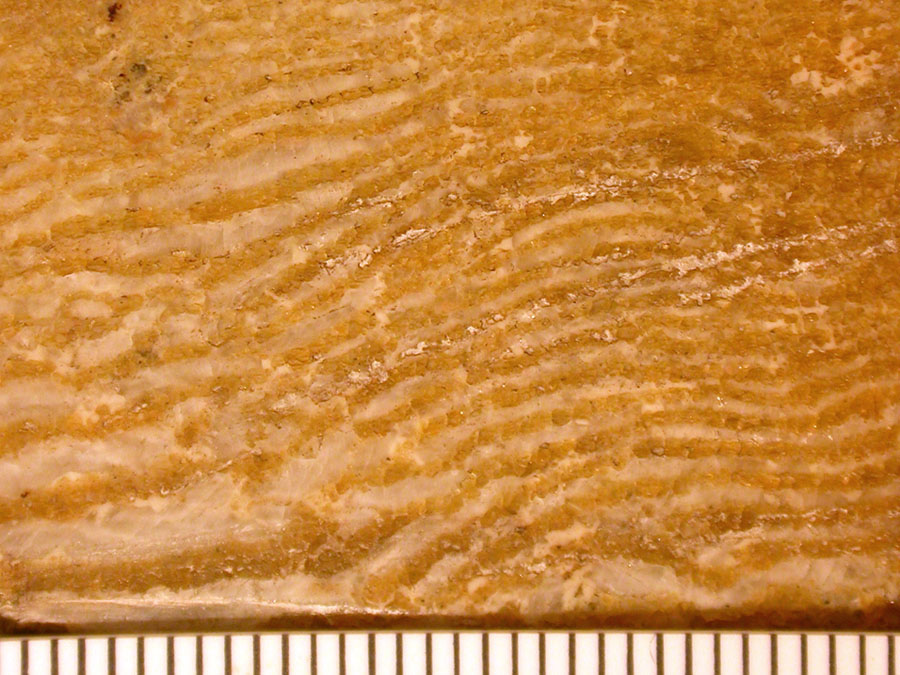
A contact metamorphic rock made of interlayered calcite and serpentine from the Precambrian of Canada. Once thought to be a pseudofossil called Eozoön canadense. Scale in mm.

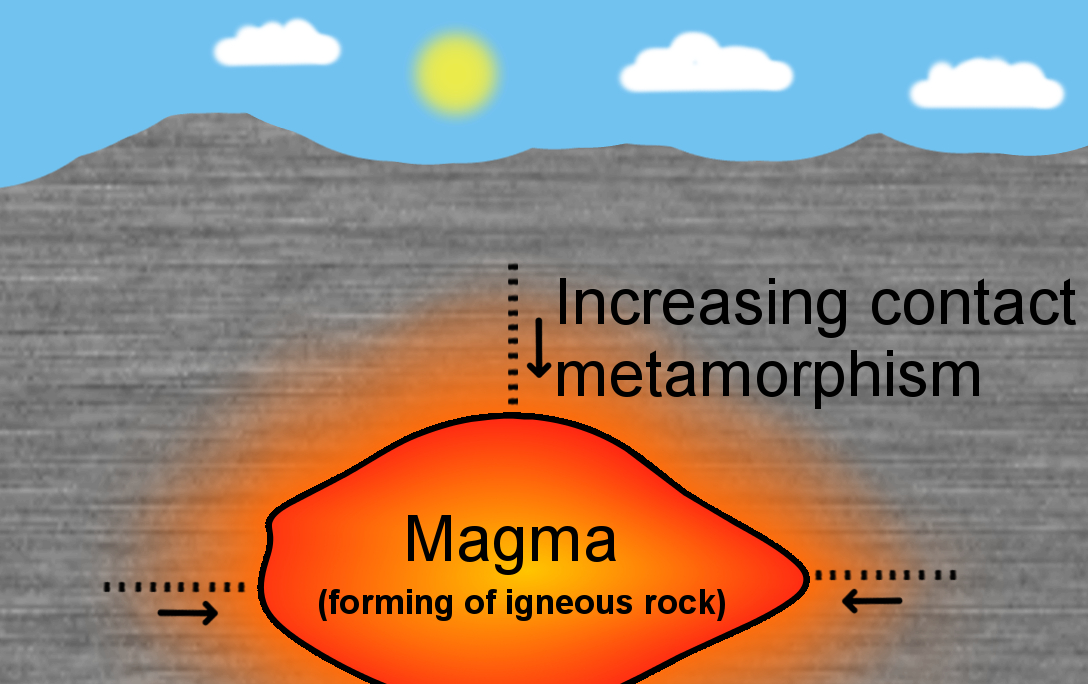

Contact metamorphism takes place when magma is injected into the surrounding solid rock (country rock). The changes that occur are greatest wherever the magma comes into contact with the rock because the temperatures are highest at this boundary and decrease with distance from it. Around the igneous rock that forms from the cooling magma is a metamorphosed zone called a contact aureole. Aureoles may show all degrees of metamorphism from the contact area to unmetamorphosed (unchanged) country rock some distance away. The formation of important ore minerals may occur by the process of metasomatism at or near the contact zone. Contact aureoles around large plutons may be as much as several kilometers wide.

The term hornfels is often used by geologists to signify those fine grained, compact, non-foliated products of contact metamorphism. The contact aureole typically shows little deformation, and so hornfels is usually devoid of schistosity and forms a tough, equigranular rock. If the rock was originally banded or foliated (as, for example, a laminated sandstone or a foliated calc-schist) this character may not be obliterated, and a banded hornfels is the product. Contact metamorphism close to the surface produces distinctive low-pressure metamorphic minerals, such as spinel, andalusite, vesuvianite, or wollastonite.

Similar changes may be induced in shales by the burning of coal seams. This produces a rock type named clinker.

There is also a tendency for metasomatism between the igneous magma and sedimentary country rock, whereby the chemicals in each are exchanged or introduced into the other. In that case, hybrid rocks called skarn arise.

=== Other occurrences ===
Dynamic (cataclastic) metamorphism takes place locally along faults. Here intense shearing of the rock typically forms mylonites.

Impact metamorphism is unlike other forms of metamorphism in that it takes place during impact events by extraterrestrial bodies. It produces rare ultrahigh pressure metamorphic minerals, such as coesite and stishovite. Coesite is rarely found in eclogite brought to the surface in kimberlite pipes, but the presence of stishovite is unique to impact structures.

== Uses ==
Slate tiles are used in construction, particularly as roof shingle.

Quartzite is sufficiently hard and dense that it is difficult to quarry. However, some quartzite is used as dimension stone, often as slabs for flooring, walls, or stairsteps. About 6% of crushed stone, used mostly for road aggregate, is quartzite.

Marble is also prized for building construction and as a medium for sculpture.

== Hazards ==
Schistose bedrock can pose a challenge for civil engineering because of its pronounced planes of weakness. A hazard may exist even in undisturbed terrain. On August 17, 1959, a magnitude 7.2 earthquake destabilized a mountain slope near Hebgen Lake, Montana, composed of schist. This caused a massive landslide that killed 26 people camping in the area.

Metamorphosed ultramafic rock contains serpentine group minerals, which includes varieties of asbestos that pose a hazard to human health.

== See also ==
- Blueschist
- List of rock types
- List of rock textures
- Metavolcanic rock
- Neomorphism
- Subduction zone metamorphism
