= Antigorite =

Phyllosilicate mineral in the serpentine subgroup

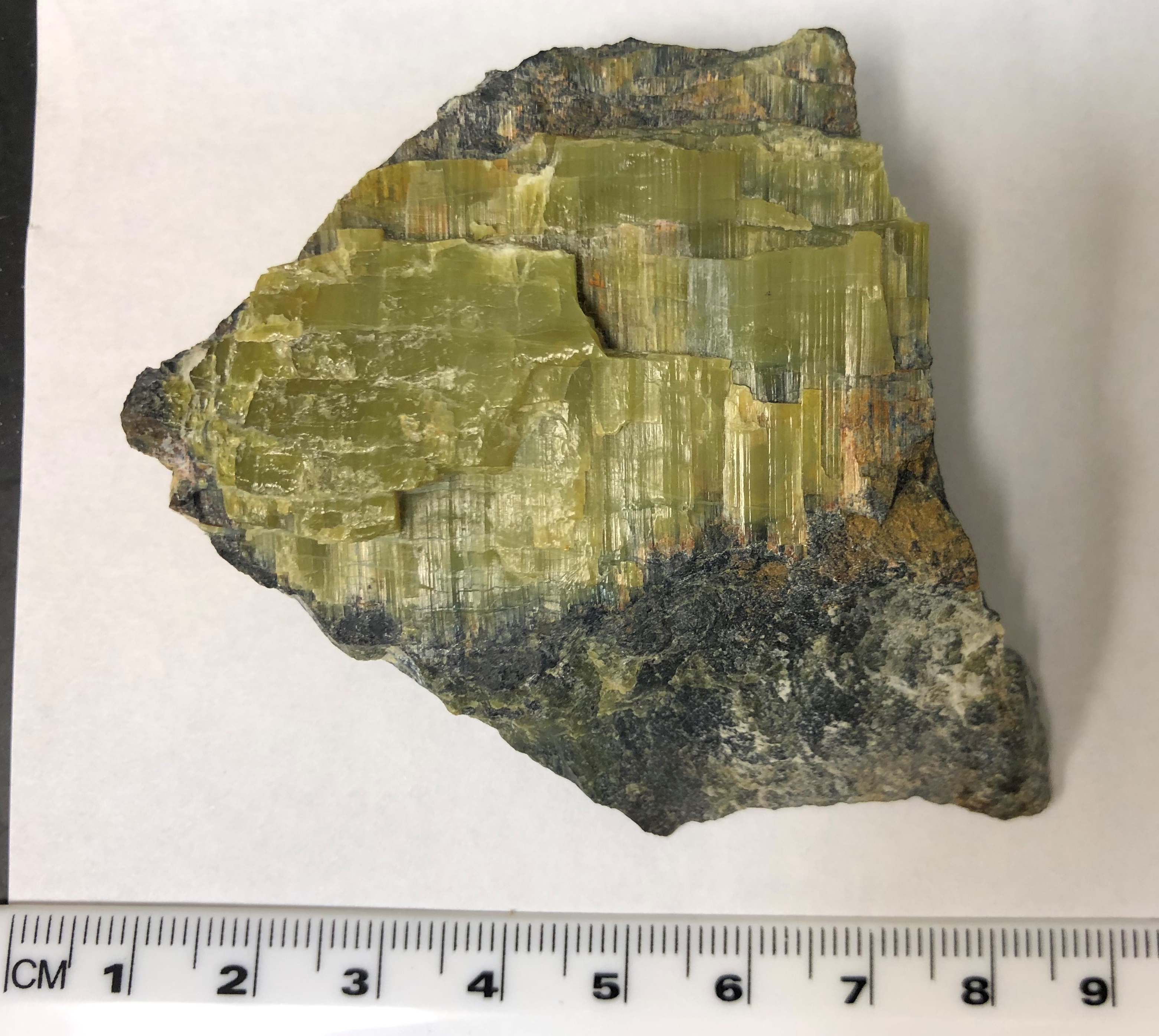
- Antigorite crystals in serpentinite from Poland

General
- Category: Phyllosilicate minerals
- Group: Kaolinite-Serpentine group, serpentine subgroup
- Formula: (Mg, Fe)_{3}Si_{2}O_{5}OH_{4}
- IMA symbol: Atg
- Strunz classification: 9.ED.15
- Crystal system: Monoclinic

Identification
- Color: Green, yellowish-green, blueish-gray
- Crystal habit: Massive or platy
- Cleavage: (001) Perfect
- Fracture: Brittle
- Mohs scale hardness: 3.5–4
- Luster: Vitreous to greasy
- Streak: Greenish white
- Specific gravity: 2.5–2.6
- Optical properties: Biaxial (−)
- Refractive index: 1.53–1.575
- Birefringence: δ = 0.005–0.006

Antigorite is a lamellated, monoclinic mineral in the phyllosilicate serpentine subgroup with the ideal chemical formula of (Mg,Fe^{2+})_{3}Si_{2}O_{5}(OH)_{4}. It is the high-pressure polymorph of serpentine and is commonly found in metamorphosed serpentinites. Antigorite, and its serpentine polymorphs, play an important role in subduction zone dynamics due to their relative weakness and high weight percent of water (up to 13 weight % H_{2}O). It is named after its type locality, the Geisspfad serpentinite, Valle Antigorio in the border region of Italy/Switzerland and is commonly used as a gemstone in jewelry and carvings.

== Geologic occurrences ==
Antigorite is found in low-temperature, high-pressure (or high-deformation) environments, including both extensional and compressional tectonic regimes. Serpentines are commonly found in the ultramafic greenschist facies of subduction zones, and are visible on the Earth's surface through secondary exhumation. Serpentinites that contain antigorite are usually highly deformed and show distinct textures, indicative of the dynamic region where they were formed. Antigorite serpentinites commonly have associated minerals of magnetite, chlorite, and carbonates. Olivine under hydrothermal action, low grade metamorphism and weathering will transform into antigorite, which is often associate with talc and carbonate.

+ 4H_{2}O + SiO_{2} →

+ 3CO2 → + + 3H_{2}O

== Physical properties ==
Lamellated antigorite occurs in tough, pleated masses. It is usually dark green in color, but may also be yellowish, gray, brown or black. It has a Mohs scale hardness of 3.5–4 and its lustre is vitreous to greasy. Antigorite has a specific gravity of 2.5–2.6. The monoclinic crystals show micaceous cleavage, a distinguished property of phyllosilicates, and fuse with difficulty. Serpentinite rocks that consist of mostly antigorite are commonly mylonites. The antigorite grains that make up these rocks are very fine (on the order of 1 to 10 microns) and are fibrous, which defines a texture in the rock caused by lattice preferred orientation.

=== Gemstone properties ===
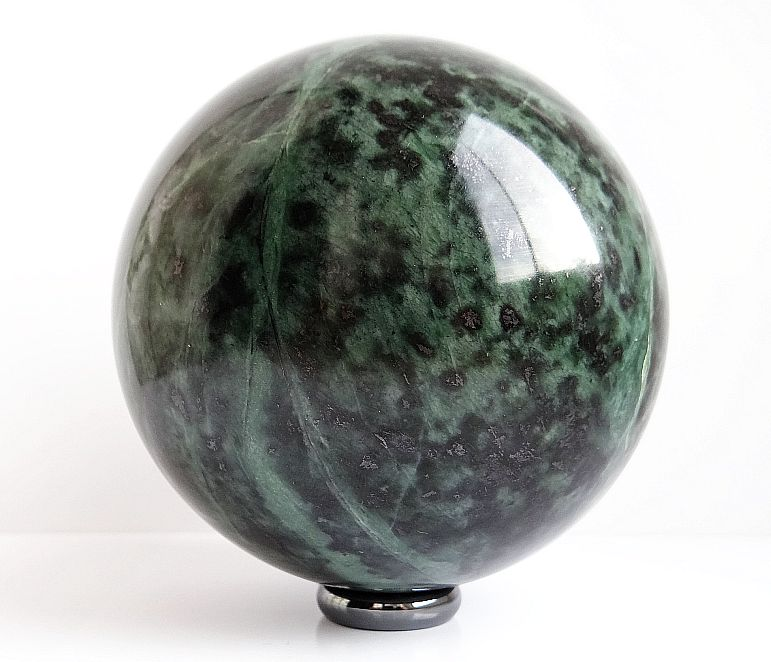
Polished antigorite

Antigorite is used as gemstones or for carvings when it appears pure and translucent, although many crystals have black specks of magnetite suspended within. The gem types of antigorite are Bowenite and Williamsite. Bowenite, known for George T. Bowen from Rhode Island (the variety's type locality), who first analyzed the mineral, is translucent and light to dark green, often mottled with cloudy white patches and darker veining. It is the serpentine most frequently encountered in carving and jewelry, and is the state mineral of Rhode Island, United States. A bowenite cabochon featured as part of the "Our Mineral Heritage Brooch", was presented to U.S. First Lady Mrs. Lady Bird Johnson in 1967. Williamsite is very translucent and has a medium to deep apple-green color. Somewhat resembling jade, Williamsite is often cut into cabochons and beads. Williamsite often has magnetite or chromite inclusions. Oddly, the presence of these inclusions often increases the value of a specimen. The most valuable williamsite is found in Maryland and southern Pennsylvania. The supply of this mineral from the Maryland-Pennsylvania region is declining due to construction and depletion of deposits.

== Crystal structure ==
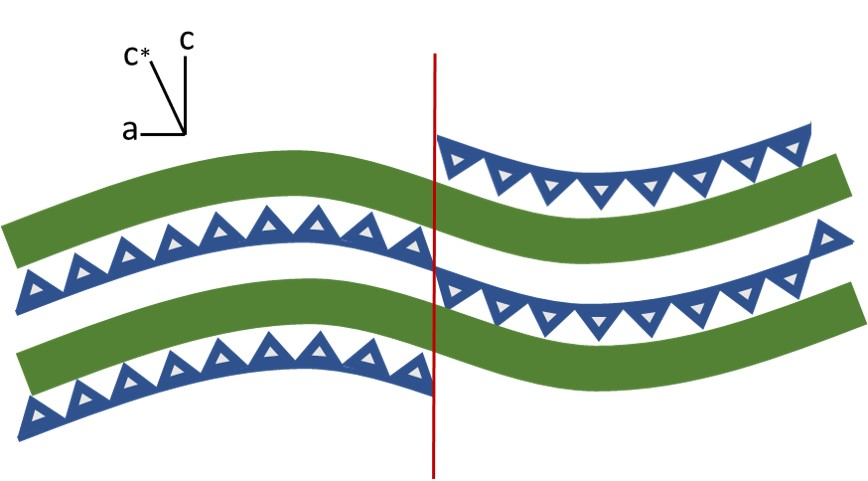
Simplified crystal structure of antigorite looking down the b axis. Blue triangles indicate SiO_{4} tetrahedra, green layers indicate Mg octahedra. Red line indicates polarity reversal. In this case, m = 17.

The magnesian serpentines (antigorite, lizardite, chrysotile) are trioctahedral hydrous phyllosilicates. Their structure is based on 1:1 octahedral-tetrahedral layer structures. Antigorite is monoclinic in the space group Pm. Although the magnesian serpentines have similar compositions, they have significantly different crystallographic structures, which are dependent on how the SiO_{4} tetrahedra sheets fit in with the octahedral sheets. Antigorite's basic composition has a smaller ratio of octahedral to tetrahedral cations (relative to lizardite and chrysotile), allowing the structure to compensate for the misfit of sheets through periodic flipping of the curved tetrahedra layers, and subsequently their polarity. Polysomes of antigorite are defined by the number of individual tetrahedra (denoted as the value m) which span a wavelength of the direction of curvature. The sheets of tetrahedra allow the platy, fibrous crystals to separate parallel to the 001 (basal) plane, giving antigorite its perfect cleavage.

== See also ==
- Serpentine subgroup
- Serpentinite
- Subduction zone metamorphism – Hydrous minerals of a subducting slab
