= Gillet de Laumont =

French mineralogist (1747–1834)

François Pierre Nicolas Gillet de Laumont (28 May 1747 – 1 June 1834) was a French mineralogist.

He was born in Paris, educated at a military school and served in the army from 1772 to 1784, when he was appointed inspector of mines. His attention in his leisure time was wholly given to mineralogy, and he assisted in organizing the new École des Mines in Paris.

He was author of numerous mineralogical papers in the "Journal et Annales des Mines". The mineral laumontite, which Laumont discovered in the mines of Huelgoat, was named after him by René Just Haüy. After the death of Jean-Baptiste L. Romé de l'Isle in 1790, Laumont purchased his large collection of minerals and crystals.

During his career, he was awarded with the Ordre de la Réunion (1813), the Légion d'honneur (1815) and the Ordre de Saint-Michel (1819). He died in Paris in 1834.
