= Bowenite =

Semi-precious gemstone

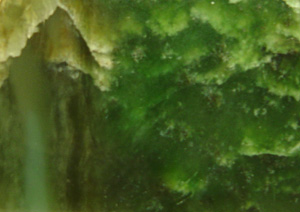
Polished slab of bowenite serpentine, a variety of antigorite.

Bowenite is a hard, compact variety of the serpentinite species antigorite (Mg_{3}(OH)O_{4}Si_{2}O_{5}). Classed as a semi-precious gemstone, it has been used for tools, weapons and jewellery by the Māori in New Zealand, and for jewellery by Fabergé. Deposits are found in several places around the world including Afghanistan, China, New Zealand, South Africa and the United States. It typically ranges in colour from dark green to light olive green, and in shades approaching yellow. Bowenite was named by James D. Dana in 1850 after George T. Bowen, who analyzed it in 1822.

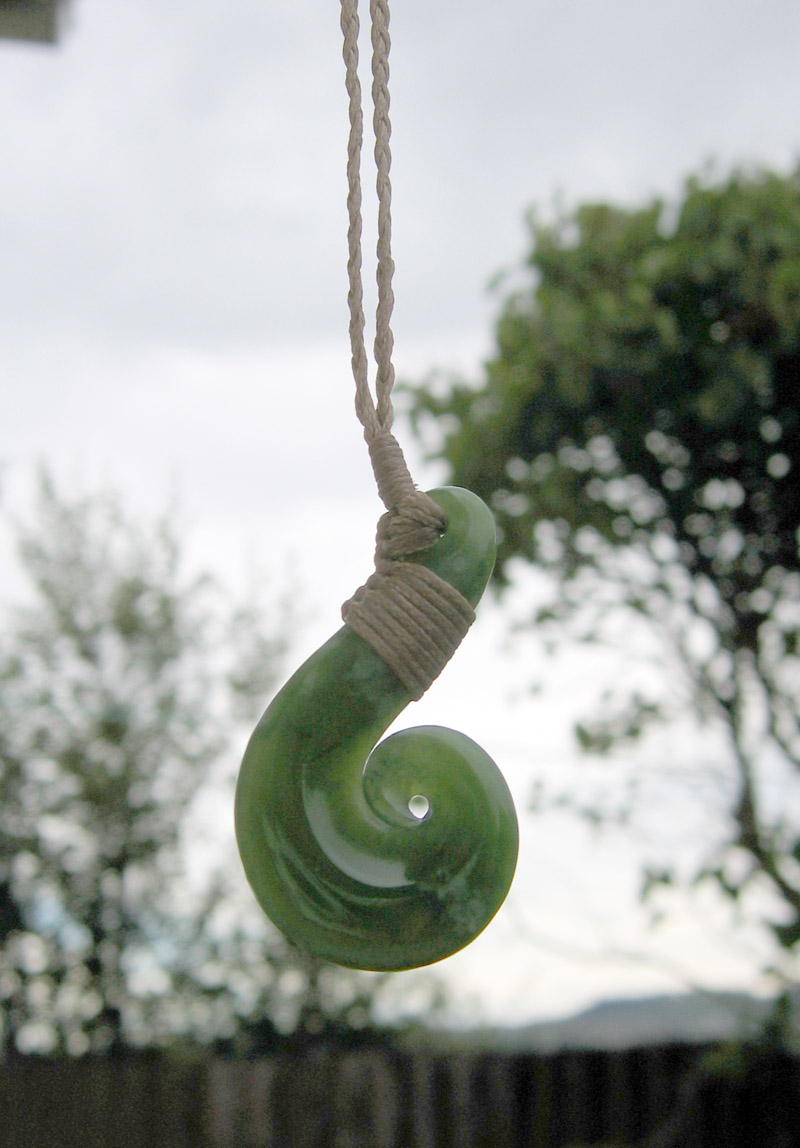
Pounamu pendant

Together with nephrite jade the Māori class bowenite as pounamu, which is also known as greenstone, and is of particular significance to the Ngāi Tahu iwi on whose traditional lands on the South Island of New Zealand most deposits are found. Historically it was used for tools, weapons and ornaments, although modern use is limited to jewellery, such as Tiki. The South Island deposits are legally protected, and taking material without Ngāi Tahu permission has led to prosecutions. In 1992 Ngāi Tahu approved the 'Pounamu Resource Management Plan' to manage deposits of this commercially valuable resource.

Bowenite is the state mineral of the U.S. state of Rhode Island.

Most deposits of bowenite are small, although a large deposit was discovered in South Africa in 1989. Deposits in China are in the Suzhou region, which accounts for its also being known as Suzhou jade with carving in elaborate designs.
