= Zeolite facies =

Zeolite facies describes the mineral assemblage resulting from the pressure and temperature conditions of low-grade metamorphism.

The zeolite facies is generally considered to be transitional between diagenetic processes which turn sediments into sedimentary rocks, and prehnite-pumpellyite facies, which is a hallmark of subseafloor alteration of the oceanic crust around mid-ocean ridge spreading centres. The zeolite and prehnite-pumpellyite facies are considered burial metamorphism as the processes of orogenic regional metamorphism are not required.

Zeolite facies is most often experienced by pelitic sediments; rocks rich in aluminium, silica, potassium and sodium, but generally low in iron, magnesium and calcium. Zeolite facies metamorphism usually results in the production of low temperature clay minerals into higher temperature polymorphs such as kaolinite and vermiculite.

Mineral assemblages include kaolinite and montmorillonite with laumontite, wairakite, prehnite, calcite and chlorite. Phengite and adularia occur in potassium rich rocks. Minerals in this series include zeolites, albite, and quartz.

This occurs by dehydration of the clays during compaction, and heating due to blanketing of the sediments by continued deposition of sediments above. Zeolite facies is considered to start with temperatures of approximately 50 - 150 °C and some burial is required, usually 1 - 5 km.

Zeolite facies tends to correlate in clay-rich sediments with the onset of a bedding plane foliation, parallel with the bedding of the rocks, caused by alignment of platy clay minerals in a horizontal orientation which reduces their free energy state.

Generally plutonic and volcanic rocks are not greatly affected by zeolite facies metamorphism, although vesicular basalts and the like will have their vesicles filled with zeolite minerals, forming amygdaloidal texture. Tuff can also become zeolitized, as is seen in the Obispo formation on the California coast.

== See also ==
- Diagenesis
- List of rock textures or rock microstructure
