= Julian Goldsmith =

American mineralogist and geochemist

Julian Royce Goldsmith (1918–1999) was a mineralogist and geochemist at the University of Chicago (Moore, 1971). Goldsmith, along with colleague Fritz Laves, first defined the crystallographic polymorphism of alkali feldspar (Newton, 1989). Goldsmith also experimented on the temperature dependence of the solid solution between calcite and dolomite (Newton, 1989). Goldsmith's research also led him to experiment with the determination of the stability of intermediate structural states of albite (Newton, 1989). For his outstanding contributions to the study of mineralogy and geochemistry, Goldsmith was awarded the prestigious Roebling Medal by the Mineralogical Society of America in 1988 (Newton, 1989). The mineral julgoldite was named for him.
