= Greenschist =

Metamorphic rock

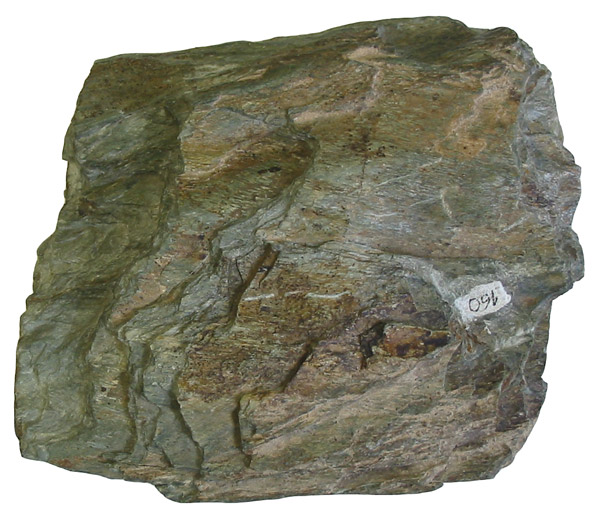
Chlorite schist, a type of greenschist

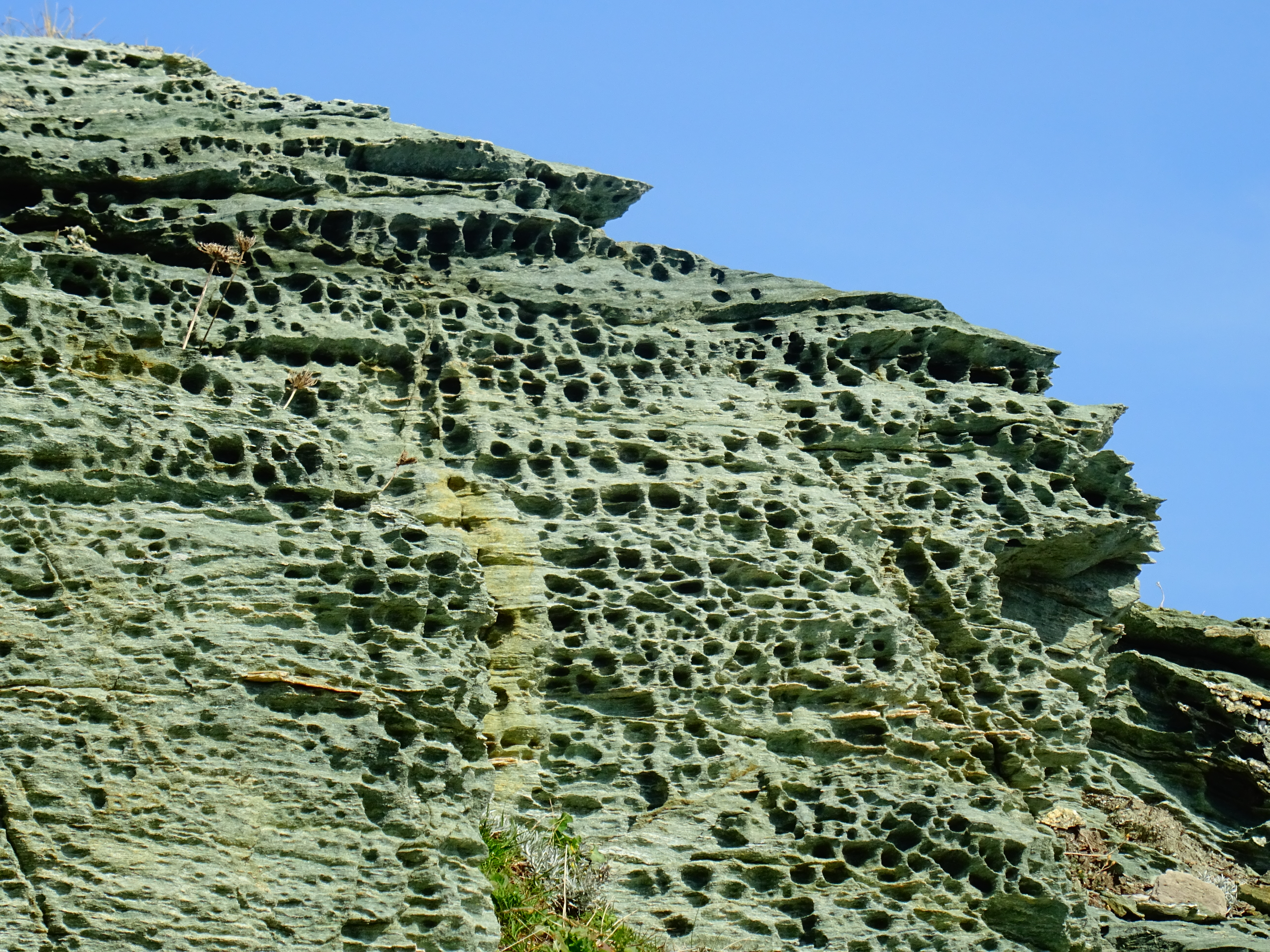
Greenschist (prasinite) at Cap Corse in Corsica, France

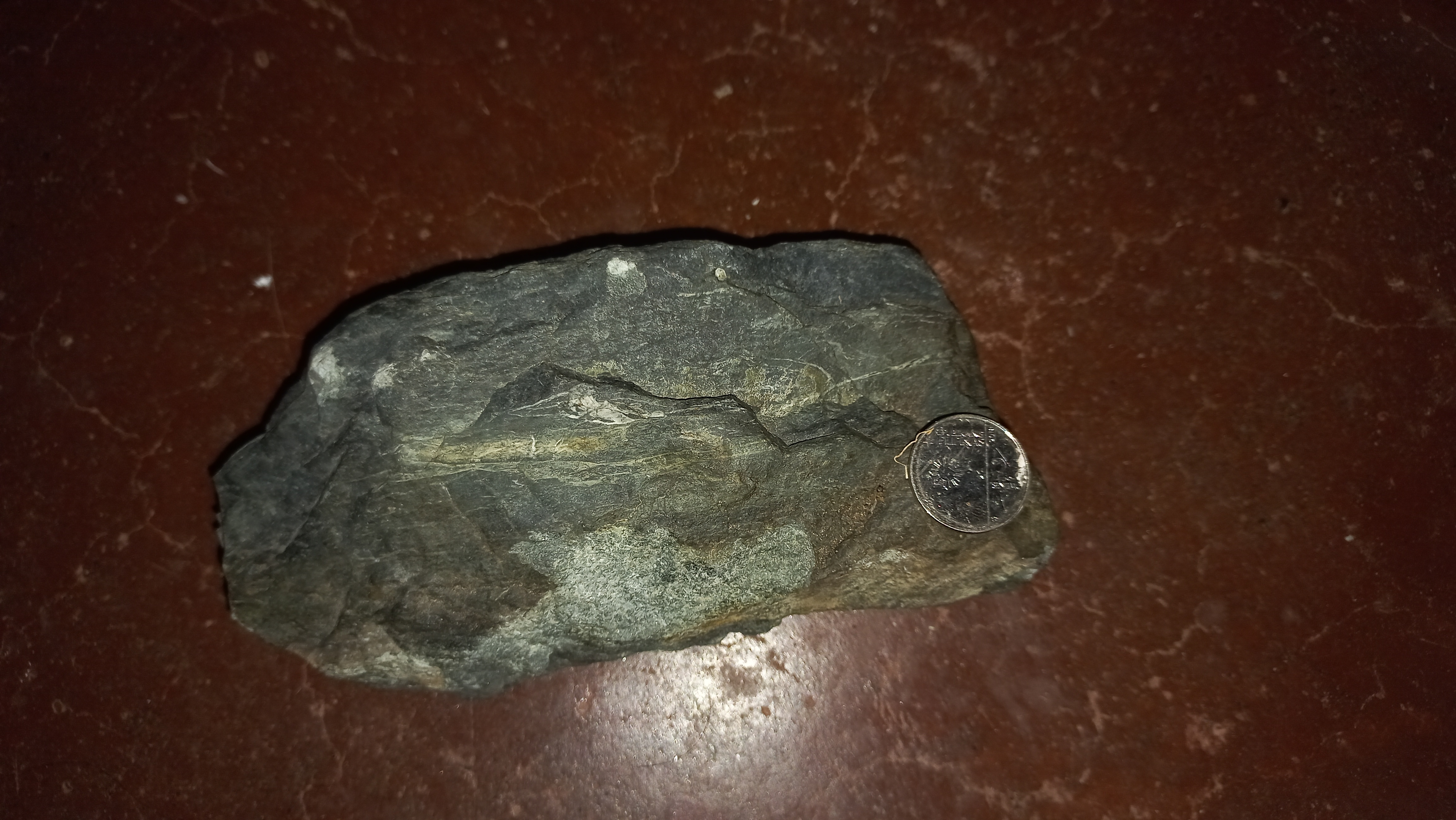
Greenschist (epidote) from Itogon, Benguet, Philippines

Greenschists are metamorphic rocks that formed under the lowest temperatures and pressures usually produced by regional metamorphism, typically 300–450 °C (570–840 °F) and 2–10 kilobars (29,000–145,000 psi). Greenschists commonly have an abundance of green minerals such as chlorite, serpentine, and epidote, and platy minerals such as muscovite and platy serpentine. The platiness gives the rock schistosity (a tendency to split into layers). Other common minerals include quartz, orthoclase, talc, carbonate minerals and amphibole (actinolite).

Greenschist is a general field petrologic term for metamorphic or altered mafic volcanic rock. In Europe, the term prasinite is sometimes used. A greenstone is sometimes a greenschist but can also be rock types without any schistosity, especially metabasalt (spilite). However, basalts may remain quite black if primary pyroxene does not revert to chlorite or actinolite. To qualify for the name, a rock must also exhibit schistosity or some foliation or layering. The rock is derived from basalt, gabbro or similar rocks containing sodium-rich plagioclase feldspar, chlorite, epidote and quartz.

== Petrology ==
Greenschist is defined by the presence of the minerals chlorite, epidote, or actinolite, which give the rock its green color. Greenschists also have pronounced schistosity. Schistosity is a thin layering of the rock produced by metamorphism (a foliation) that permits the rock to easily be split into flakes or slabs less than 5 to 10 millimeters (0.2 to 0.4 in) thick. This arises from the presence of chlorite or other platy minerals that become aligned in layers during metamorphism. Greenschist may also contain albite and often has a lepidoblastic, nematoblastic or schistose texture defined primarily by chlorite and actinolite. Grain size is rarely coarse, due primarily to the mineral assemblage. Chlorite and to a lesser extent actinolite typically exhibit small, flat or acicular crystal habits.

Greenstone is a field term for any massive mafic volcanic rock that has been altered to a greenish color by the formation of the same minerals that give the green color to greenschist, whether or not the rock displays schistosity. The term has also been used to describe any igneous intrusions into the Coal Measures Group of Scotland, to describe chamosite-rich mudstone of Early Jurassic age in Great Britain, or for nephrite or other greenish gemstones.

== Greenschist facies ==
Graph of metamorphic facies temperature and pressure ranges

Greenschist facies is determined by the particular temperature and pressure conditions required to metamorphose basalt to form the typical greenschist facies minerals chlorite, actinolite, and albite. Greenschist facies results from low temperature, moderate pressure metamorphism. Metamorphic conditions which create typical greenschist facies assemblages are called the Barrovian Facies Sequence, and the lower-pressure Abukuma Facies Series. Temperatures of approximately 400 to 500 °C (750 to 930 °F) and depths of about 8 to 50 kilometres (5 to 31 miles) are the typical envelope of greenschist facies rocks.

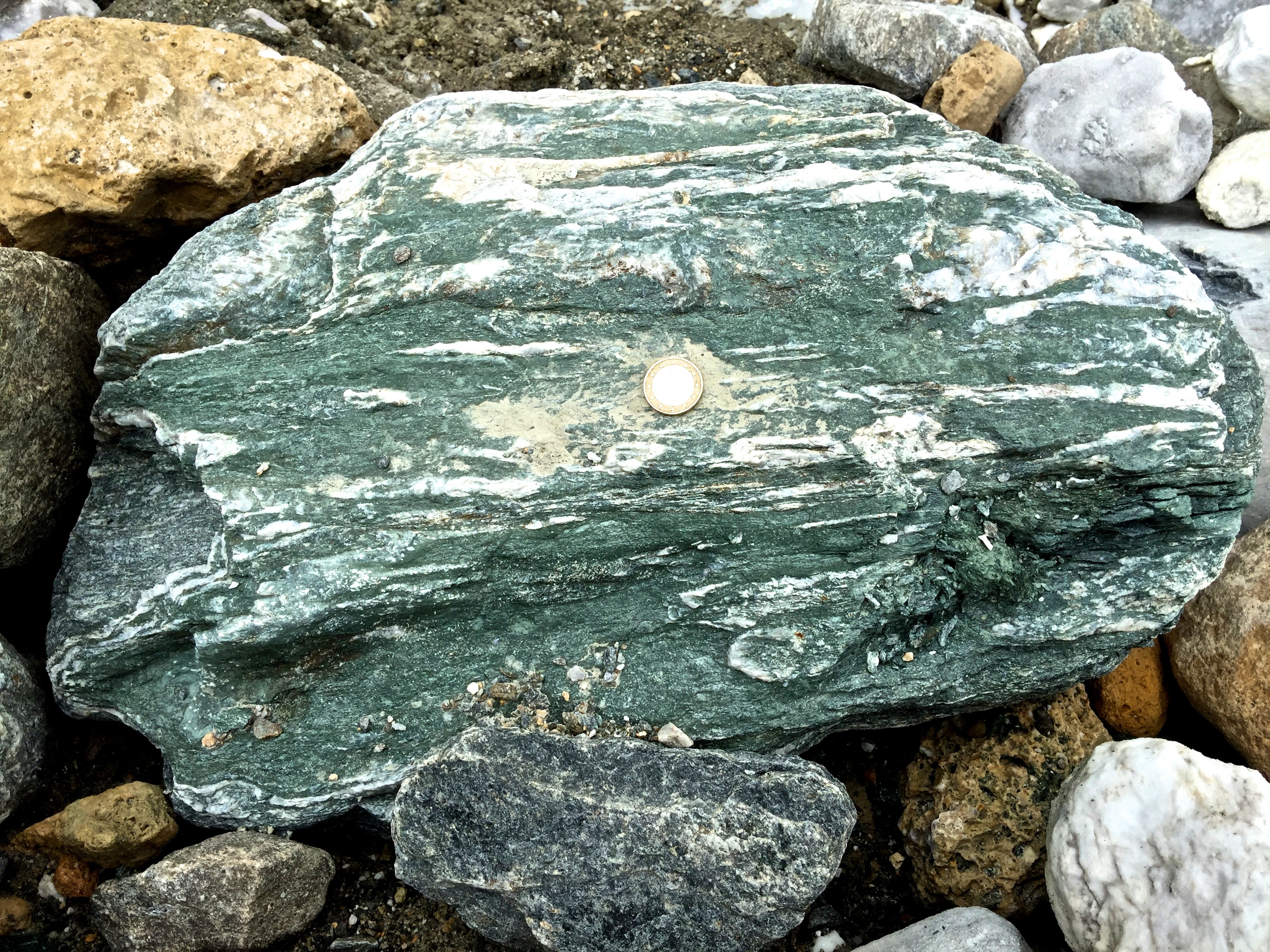
Prasinite variety of greenschist (Mont-Cenis massif, French Alps)

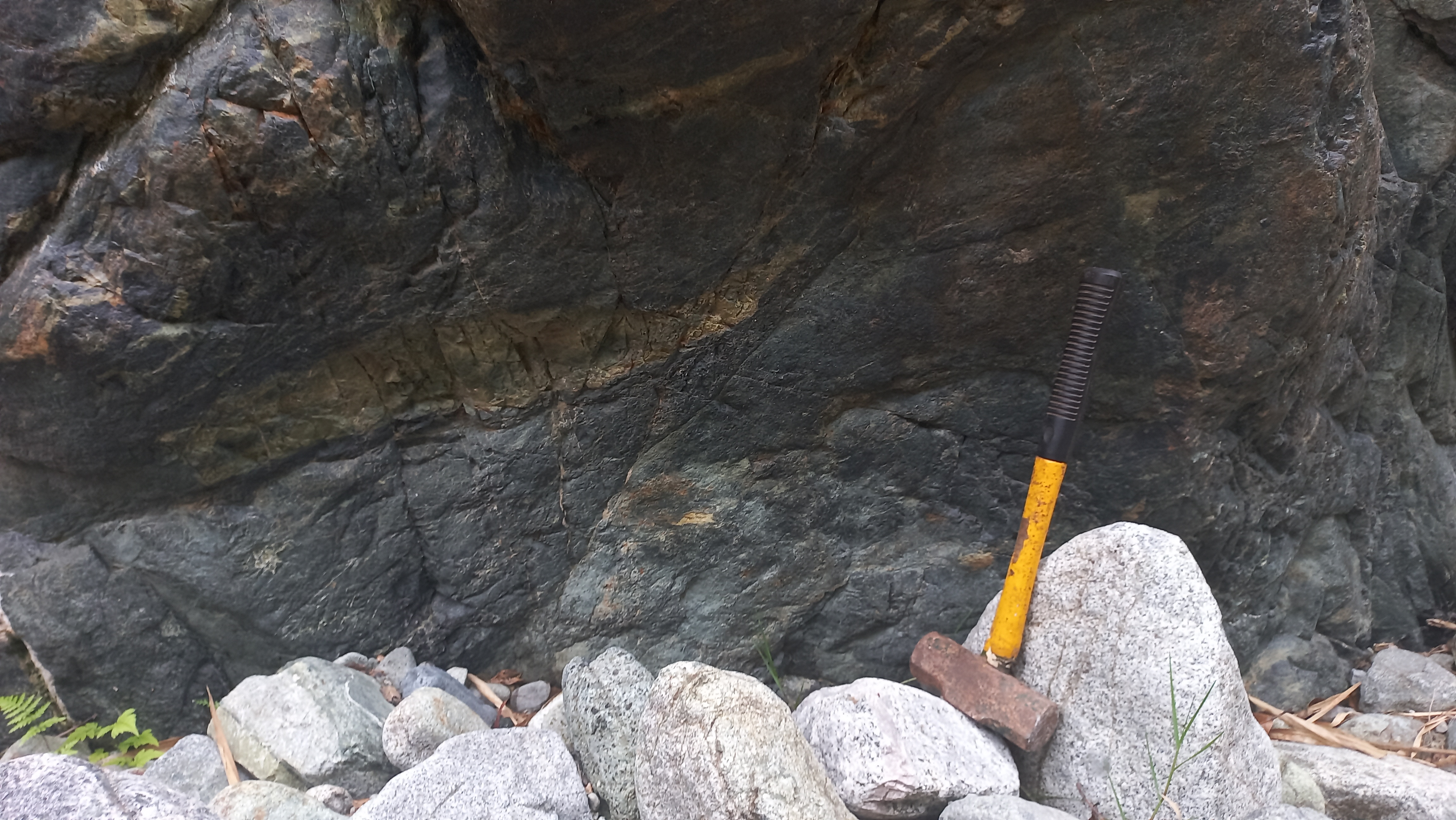
Outcrop of amphibole epidote variety of greenschist, Philippines

The equilibrium mineral assemblage of rocks subjected to greenschist facies conditions depends on primary rock composition.

- Basalt: chlorite + actinolite + albite +/- epidote
- Ultramafic: chlorite + serpentine +/- talc +/- tremolite +/- diopside +/- brucite
- Pelites: quartz +/- albite +/- k-feldspar +/- chlorite, muscovite, garnet, pyrophyllite +/- graphite
- Calc-silicates: calcite +/- dolomite +/- quartz +/- micas, scapolite, wollastonite, etc.

In greater detail the greenschist facies is subdivided into subgreenschist, lower and upper greenschist. Lower temperatures are transitional with and overlap the prehnite-pumpellyite facies and higher temperatures overlap with and include sub-amphibolite facies.

If burial continues along Barrovian Sequence metamorphic trajectories, greenschist facies gives rise to amphibolite facies assemblages, dominated by amphibole and eventually to granulite facies. Lower pressure, normally contact metamorphism produces albite-epidote hornfels while higher pressures at great depth produces eclogite.

Oceanic basalts in the vicinity of mid-ocean ridges typically exhibit sub-greenschist alteration. The greenstone belts of the various Archean cratons are commonly altered to the greenschist facies. These ancient rocks are noted as host rocks for a variety of ore deposits in Australia, Namibia and Canada.

Greenschist-like rocks can also be formed under blueschist facies conditions if the original rock (protolith) contains enough magnesium. This explains the scarcity of blueschist preserved from before the Neoproterozoic Era 1000 Ma ago when the Earth's oceanic crust contained more magnesium than today's oceanic crust.

== Use ==
=== Europe ===
In Minoan Crete, greenschist and blueschist were used to pave streets and courtyards between 1650 and 1600 BC. These rocks were likely quarried in Agia Pelagia on the north coast of central Crete.

Across Europe, greenschist rocks have been used to make axes. Several sites, including Great Langdale in England, have been identified.

=== Eastern North America ===
A form of chlorite schist was popular in prehistoric Native American communities for the production of axes and celts, as well as ornamental items. In the Middle Woodland period, greenschist was one of the many trade items that were part of the Hopewell culture exchange network, sometimes transported over thousands of kilometers.

During the time of the Mississippian culture, the polity of Moundville apparently had some control over the production and distribution of greenschist. The Moundville source has been shown to be from two localities in the Hillabee Formation of central and eastern Alabama.

== See also ==
- List of minerals
- List of rock types
- Metamorphism
- Pounamu, another type of rock frequently called greenstone
