= Polysome (crystallography) =

Mineral structure

In crystallography, the term polysome is used to describe overall mineral structures which have structurally and compositionally different framework structures.

A general example is amphiboles, in which cutting along the {010} plane yields alternating layers of pyroxene and trioctahedral mica.
