= Pumpellyite =

Pumpellyite series

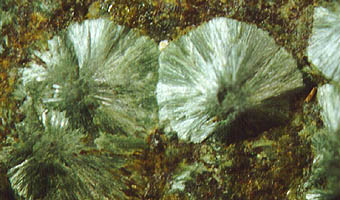

General
- Category: Sorosilicate
- IMA symbol: Pmp
- Strunz classification: 9.BG.20
- Crystal system: Monoclinic
- Crystal class: Prismatic (2/m) (same H-M symbol)
- Space group: A2/m

Identification
- Color: Olive green to bluish green
- Cleavage: Good in two directions
- Fracture: Uneven
- Tenacity: Brittle
- Mohs scale hardness: 5.5-6
- Luster: Vitreous, dull
- Streak: White
- Diaphaneity: Translucent
- Specific gravity: 3.2

Pumpellyite is a group of closely related sorosilicate minerals:

- pumpellyite-(Mg): Ca_{2}MgAl_{2}[Si_{2}O_{6}OH][SiO_{4}](OH)_{2}(OH)
- pumpellyite-(Fe2+): Ca_{2}Fe^{2+}Al_{2}[Si_{2}O_{6}OH][SiO_{4}](OH)_{2}(OH)
- pumpellyite-(Fe3+): Ca_{2}Fe^{3+}Al_{2}[Si_{2}O_{6}OH][SiO_{4}](OH)_{2}O
- pumpellyite-(Mn2+): Ca_{2}Mn^{2+}Al_{2}[Si_{2}O_{6}OH][SiO_{4}](OH)_{2}(OH)
- pumpellyite-(Al): Ca_{2}AlAl_{2}[Si_{2}O_{6}OH][SiO_{4}](OH)_{2}O

Pumpellyite crystallizes in the monoclinic-prismatic crystal system. It typically occurs as blue-green to olive green fibrous to lamellar masses. It is translucent and glassy with a Mohs hardness of 5.5 and a specific gravity of 3.2. It has refractive indices of n_{α}=1.674–1.748, n_{β}=1.675–1.754 and n_{γ}=1.688–1.764.

Pumpellyite occurs as amygdaloidal and fracture fillings in basaltic and gabbroic rocks in metamorphic terranes. It is an indicator mineral of the prehnite-pumpellyite metamorphic facies. It is associated with chlorite, epidote, quartz, calcite and prehnite.

It was first described in 1925 for occurrences in the Calumet mine, Houghton Co., Keweenaw Peninisula, Michigan, and named for United States geologist Raphael Pumpelly (1837–1923).

The first actual discovery of the silicate was made by Gheorghe Munteanu-Murgoci in the Lotru Mountains in 1900, being named Lotrite however, it was not until 1947 that soviet mineralogist Vladimir Sobolev proved that Munteanu-Murgoci's lotrite and Palache's pumpellyite were the exact same mineral chemically and structurally and by that point the term pumpellyite had become firmly established.

== See also ==
- Chlorastrolite
- Dallasite
