= Prehnite-pumpellyite facies =

The prehnite-pumpellyite facies is a metamorphic facies typical of subseafloor alteration of the oceanic crust around mid-ocean ridge spreading centres. It is a metamorphic grade transitional between zeolite facies and greenschist facies representing a temperature range of 250 to 350 °C and a pressure range of approximately two to seven kilobars. The mineral assemblage is dependent on host composition.

- In mafic rocks the assemblage is chlorite, prehnite, albite, pumpellyite and epidote.
- In ultramafic rocks the assemblage is serpentine, talc, forsterite, tremolite and chlorite.
- In argillaceous sedimentary rocks the assemblage is quartz, illite, albite, and stilpnomelane chlorite.
- In carbonate sediments the assemblage is calcite, dolomite, quartz, clays, talc, and muscovite.
