= Laumontite =

Calcium zeolite mineral

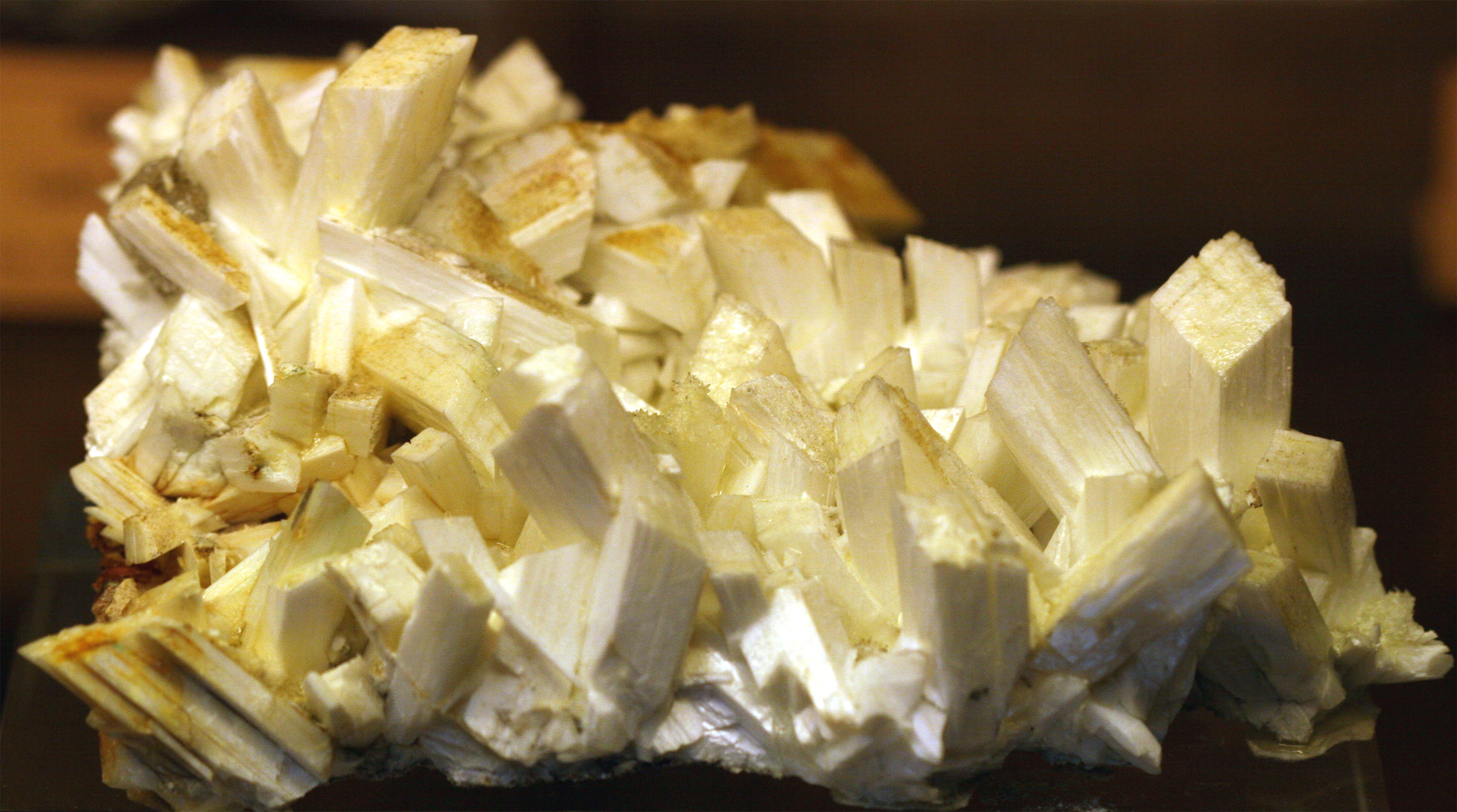

General
- Category: Tectosilicate minerals
- Group: Zeolite group
- Formula: CaAl_{2}Si_{4}O_{12}·4H_{2}O
- IMA symbol: Lmt
- Strunz classification: 9.GB.10
- Crystal system: Monoclinic
- Crystal class: Prismatic (2/m) (same H-M symbol)
- Space group: C2/m

Identification
- Color: White, colorless, yellowish, brownish
- Cleavage: Perfect, two directions
- Fracture: Uneven
- Mohs scale hardness: 4

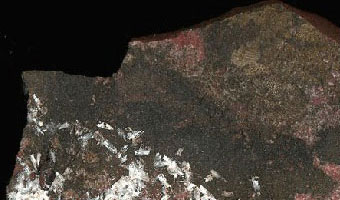
Laumontite crystals

Laumontite is a mineral, one of the zeolite group. Its molecular formula is CaAl_{2}Si_{4}O_{12}·4H_{2}O, a hydrated calcium-aluminium silicate. Potassium or sodium may substitute for the calcium but only in very small amounts.

It is monoclinic, space group C2/m. It forms prismatic crystals with a diamond-shaped cross-section and an angled termination. When pure, the color is colorless or white. Impurities may color it orange, brownish, gray, yellowish, pink, or reddish. It has perfect cleavage on [010] and [110] and its fracture is conchoidal. It is very brittle. The Mohs scale hardness is 3.5-4. It has a vitreous luster and a white streak. It is found in hydrothermal deposits left in calcareous rocks, often formed as a result of secondary mineralization. Host rock types include basalt, andesite, metamorphic rocks and granites. It forms at a temperature of about 100 °C (212 °F), and becomes unstable above about 150 °C (302 °F), and so its presence in sedimentary rocks indicates that these have experienced intermediate diagenesis.

The identification of laumontite goes back to the early days of mineralogy. It was first named lomonite by R. Jameson (System of Mineralogy) in 1805, and laumonite by René Just Haüy in 1809. The current name was given by K.C. von Leonhard (Handbuch der Oryktognosie) in 1821. It is named after Gillet de Laumont who collected samples from lead mines in Huelgoat, Brittany, making them the type locality.

Laumontite easily dehydrates when stored in a low humidity environment. When freshly collected, if it has not already been exposed to the environment, it can be translucent or transparent. Over a period of hours to days the loss of water turns it opaque white. In the past, this variety has been called leonhardite, though this is not a valid mineral species. The dehydrated laumontite is very friable, often falling into a powder at the slightest touch.

It is a common mineral, found worldwide. It can be locally abundant, forming seams and veins. It is frequently associated with other zeolites, including stilbite and heulandite. Notable occurrences are India; Paterson, New Jersey; Pine Creek, California; Iceland; Scotland; and the Bay of Fundy, Nova Scotia. Prehnite pseudomorphs after laumontite (epimorphs) have been found in India.
