= Prehnite =

Inosilicate of calcium and aluminium: Transitional to phyllosilicate

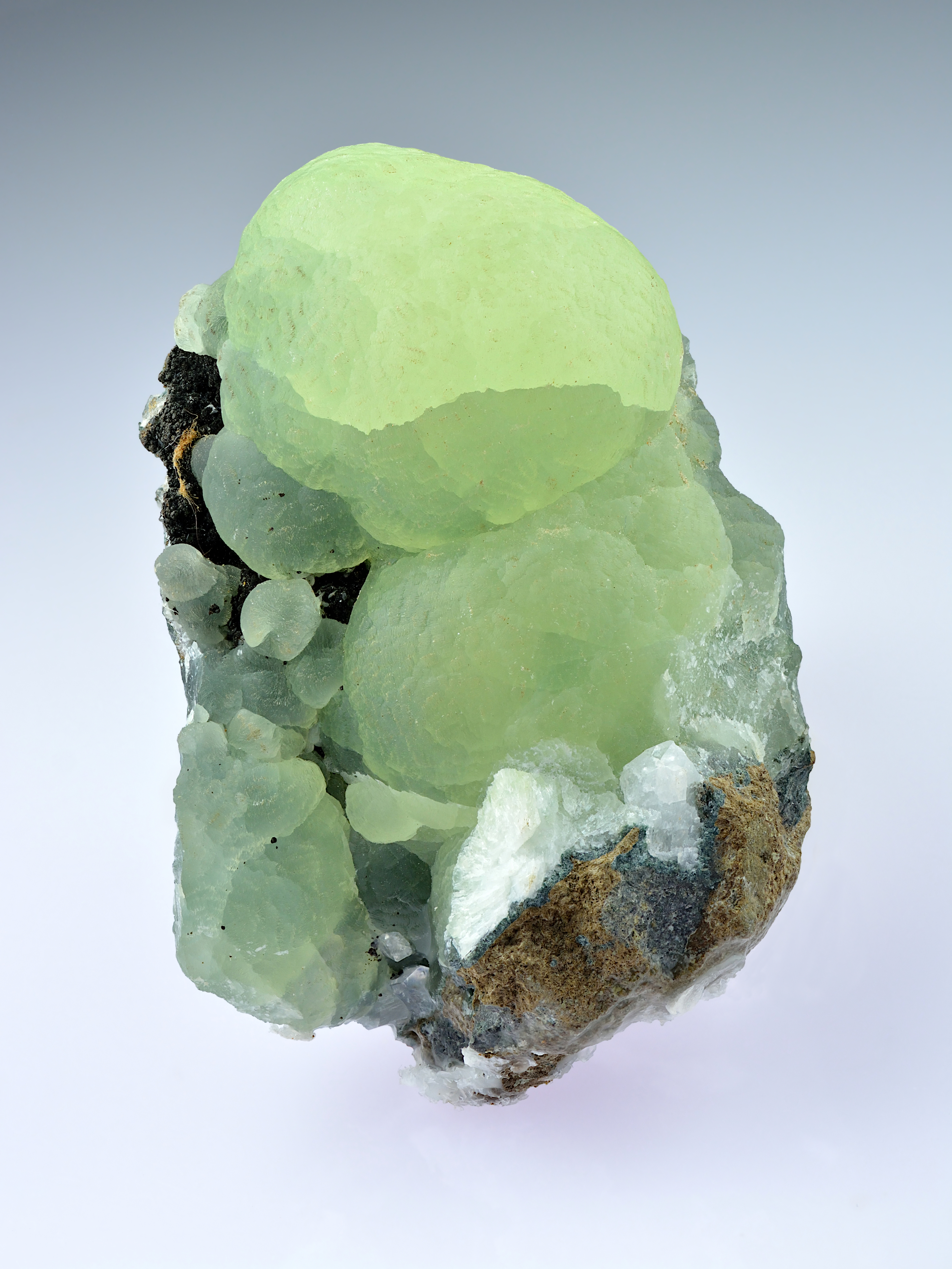

General
- Category: Silicate mineral
- Formula: Ca_{2}Al(AlSi_{3}O_{10})(OH)_{2}
- IMA symbol: Prh
- Strunz classification: 9.DP.20 (Inosilicate transitional to phyllosilicate)
- Dana classification: 72.1.3.1 (Phyllosilicate)
- Crystal system: Orthorhombic
- Crystal class: Pyramidal (mm2) (same H-M symbol)
- Space group: P2cm

Identification
- Color: Colorless to gray to yellow, yellow-green or white
- Crystal habit: Globular, reniform to stalactitic
- Twinning: Fine lamellar
- Cleavage: Distinct on [001]
- Tenacity: Brittle
- Mohs scale hardness: 6–6.5
- Luster: Vitreous to pearly
- Streak: White
- Diaphaneity: Semi-transparent to translucent
- Specific gravity: 2.8–2.95
- Optical properties: Biaxial (+)
- Refractive index: nα = 1.611 – 1.632 nβ = 1.615 – 1.642 nγ = 1.632 – 1.665
- Birefringence: δ = 0.021 – 0.033
- Dispersion: weak r > v
- Ultraviolet fluorescence: Fluorescent, short UV=blue white mild peach, long UV=yellow

Prehnite is an inosilicate of calcium and aluminium with the formula: Ca_{2}Al(AlSi_{3}O_{10})(OH)_{2} with limited Fe^{3+} substitutes for aluminium in the structure. Prehnite crystallizes in the orthorhombic crystal system, and most often forms as stalactitic, botryoidal, reniform or globular aggregates, with only just the crests of small crystals showing any faces, which are almost always curved or composite. Very rarely will it form distinct, well-individualized crystals showing a square-like cross-section, including those found at the Jeffrey Mine in Asbestos, Quebec, Canada and China. Prehnite is brittle with an uneven fracture and a vitreous to pearly luster. Its hardness is 6.5, its specific gravity is 2.80–2.95 and its color varies from light green to yellow, but also colorless, blue, pink or white. In April 2000, rare orange prehnite was discovered in the Kalahari Manganese Fields, South Africa. Prehnite is mostly translucent, and rarely transparent.

Though not a zeolite, prehnite is found associated with minerals such as datolite, calcite, apophyllite, epidote, stilbite, laumontite, and heulandite in veins and cavities of basaltic rocks, sometimes in granites, syenites, or gneisses. It is an indicator mineral of the prehnite-pumpellyite metamorphic facies.

It was first described in 1788 for an occurrence in the Karoo dolerites of Cradock, Eastern Cape Province, South Africa. It was named for Colonel Hendrik Von Prehn (1733–1785), commander of the military forces of the Dutch colony at the Cape of Good Hope from 1768 to 1780.

It is used as a gemstone.

Extensive deposits of gem-quality prehnite occur in the basalt tableland surrounding Wave Hill Station in the central Northern Territory, of Australia.

== Gallery ==
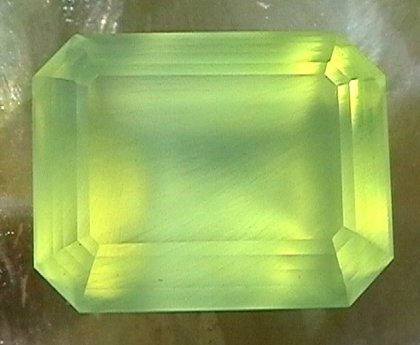
Emerald cut prehnite, 1.85 cm × 1.42 cm, 4.6 grams.

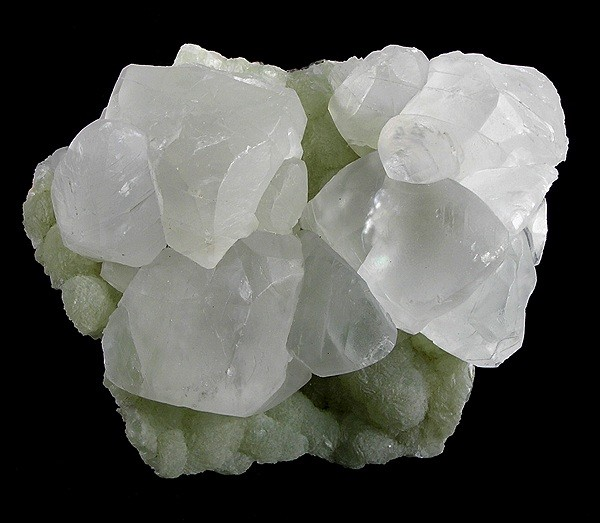
Thin plate of pea-green prehnite on which have grown calcites

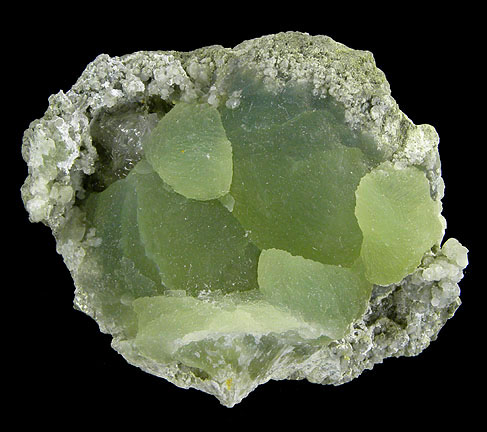
Water green color spheres of crystallized prehnite with minor calcite on basalt

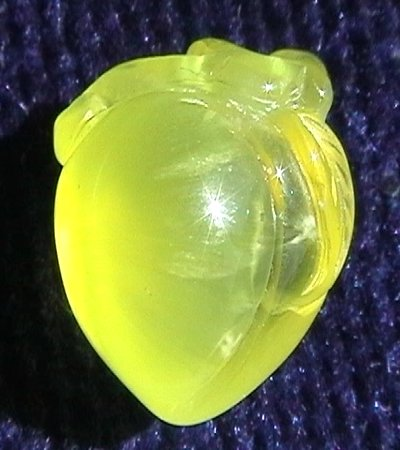
Carved yellow prehnite pendant, 2.4 cm × 1.8 cm, 5.5 grams

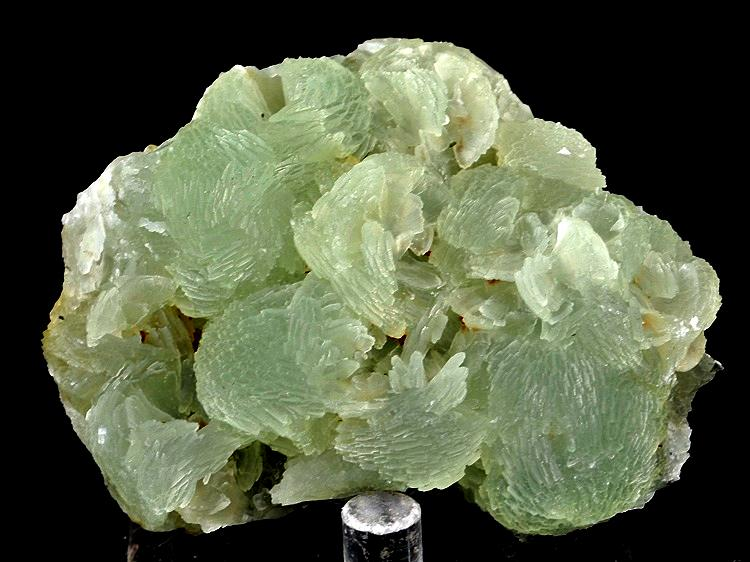
Pastel-green rosettes of prehnite blades on matrix

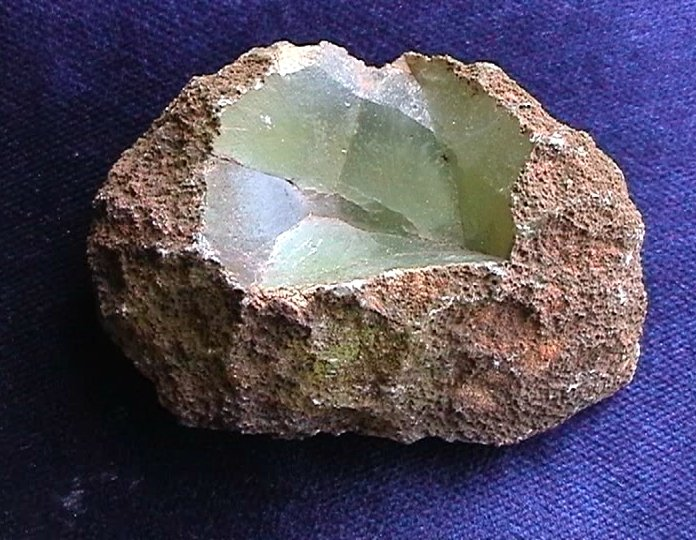
Prehnite nodule fragment, 11.0 cm × 7.0 cm, 338 grams.

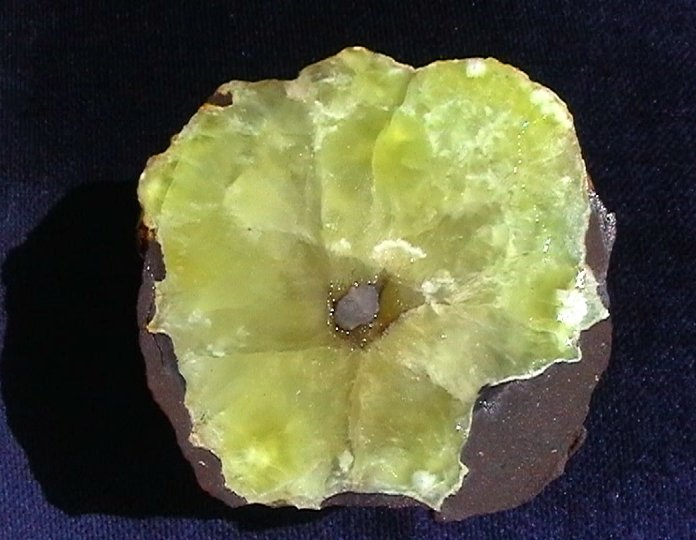
Sliced prehnite fragment with calcite core, 9.0 cm diameter.

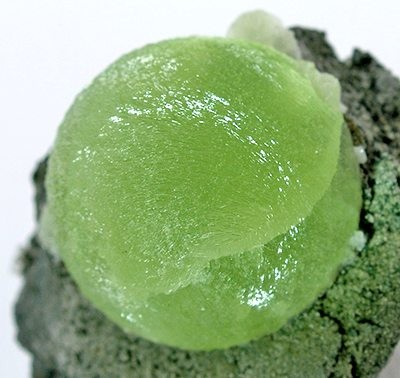
A 2 cm prehnite ball of top quality and color

== See also ==
- List of minerals
- List of minerals named after people
