= Greenstone Ridge Trail =

Hiking trail on Isle Royale in Michigan, United States

Coordinates: 48°02′07″N 88°48′31″W

- Length: 40 miles (64 kilometres)
- Location: Michigan
- Use: Hiking
- Elevation gain/loss: 1,555 m (5,102 ft)
- Difficulty: Medium

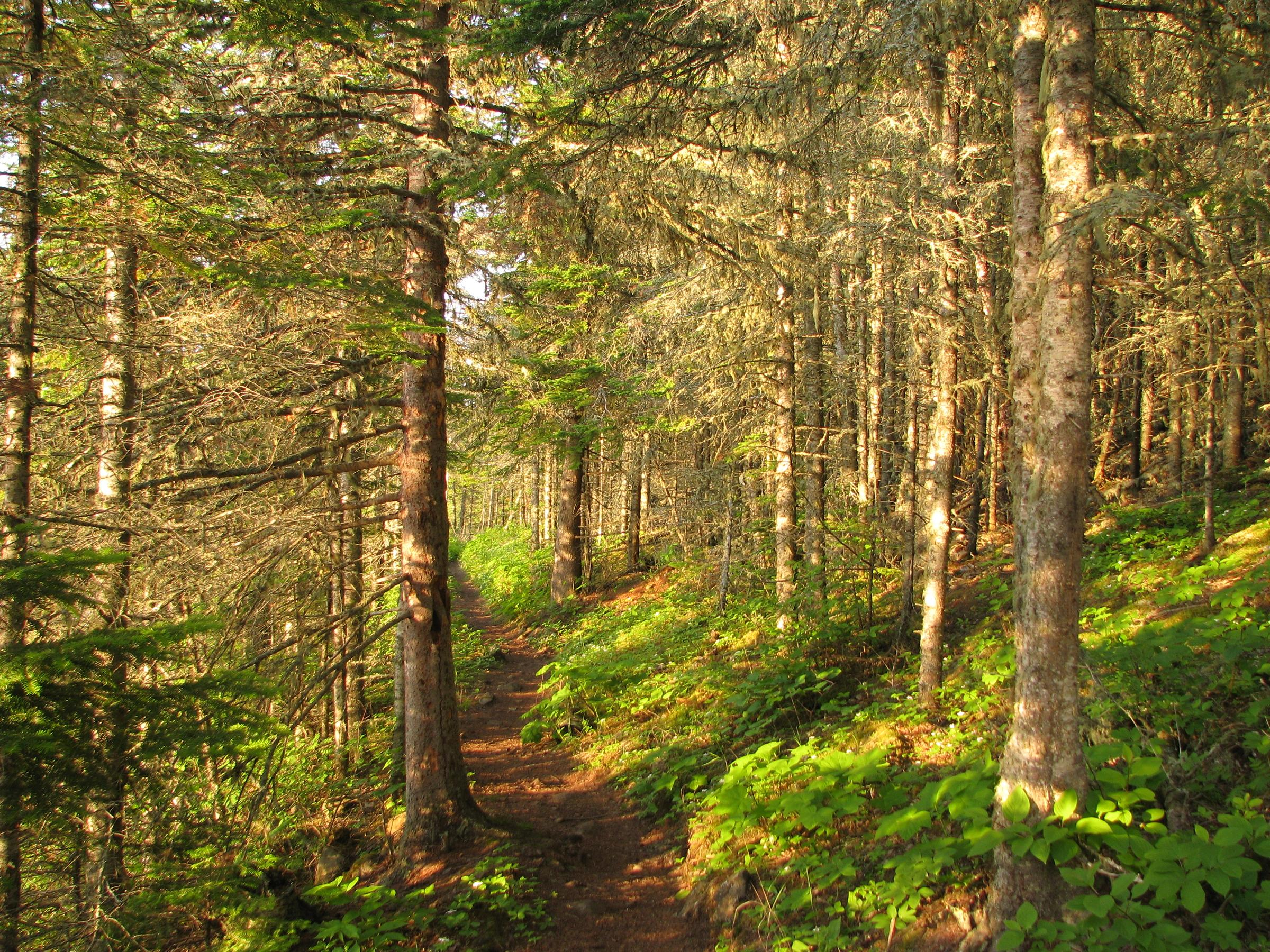
Trail in woodlands

The Greenstone Ridge Trail is a 40-mile-long (64 km) hiking trail on Isle Royale, in Lake Superior, northern Michigan. The island is within Isle Royale National Park.

There are no roads on the island, a wilderness area and national park, so the trail doubles as the primary means of land transportation across the island.

== Route ==
The trail extends from Windigo Harbor and the Windigo Ranger Station on the island's western end, east across Isle Royale, to Rock Harbor and the Rock Harbor Lodge.

The Greenstone Ridge Trail generally follows the top of Greenstone Ridge, a low ridge that forms the east/west spine of the island and surmounts Mount Desor, the highest point of Isle Royale. Hikers may appreciate the higher elevations as they can reduce biting mosquitoes, which are found in great numbers in the lower elevation wetlands.

== Natural history ==
Hikers may see signs of the wolves and moose on Isle Royale; although these animals are scarce and shy, the woodlands that adjoin the trail are their habitat. The Greenstone Ridge and its Trail are both named after Chlorastrolite (Greenstone), a local semiprecious stone that is the state gem of the U.S. state of Michigan. Greenstone can be seen in various locations on Isle Royale, including shoreline pebbles.

== See also ==
- Index list of Isle Royale National Park
