= Patuxent =

Patuxent may refer to:

== People ==
- Patuxent people, an Algonquian people indigenous to what is now the Mid-Atlantic United States

== Places and geological features ==
- Patuxent, Maryland, an unincorporated community in Charles County
- Patuxent Ice Stream, between the Patuxent Range and Pecora Escarpment
- Patuxent Range, a mountain chain in Antarctica
- Patuxent River, Maryland
- Patuxent Wildlife Research Center, a U.S. Fish and Wildlife Service facility in Beltsville, Maryland
- Naval Air Station Patuxent River, an installation of the United States Navy in St. Mary's County, Maryland
- Calvert County, Maryland, once known as Patuxent County
- Woodwardville, Maryland, an unincorporated community known as Patuxent from 1927 to the 1980s

== Other ==
- Patuxent River stone, the state gem of Maryland
- USS Patuxent (AT-11), sea-going tugboat in commission with the United States Navy from 1909 to 1924
- USS Patuxent (AO-44), an oiler in commission with the United States Navy from 1942 to 1946
- USNS Patuxent (T-AO-201), a fleet replenishment oiler in service with the United States Navy since 1995.
