= Conglomerate Bay, Michigan =

Unincorporated place in Michigan, US

Coordinates: 48°04′42″N 88°35′06″W

Conglomerate Bay, Michigan, was an unincorporated place on Isle Royale. It had a post office for part of July 1878.
