= Population fragmentation =

Form of population segregation

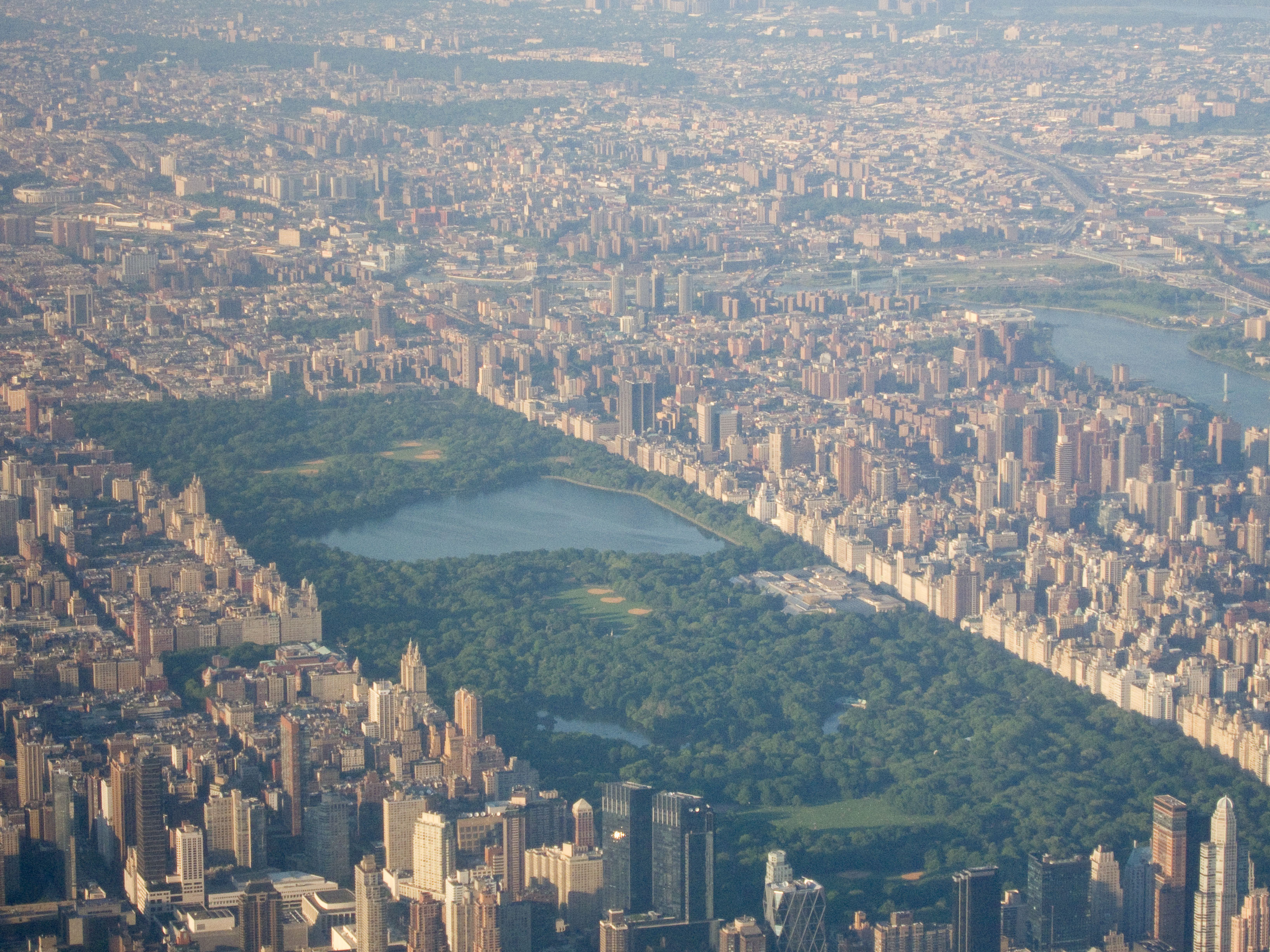
Central Park in New York City

Population fragmentation is a form of population segregation. It is a biological consequence of habitat fragmentation in which a population is divided into smaller, isolated groups due to physical separation, leading to genetic drift and inbreeding.

== Causes ==
Population fragmentation is characterized by habitat loss and degradation, leading to a decrease in population size and connectivity. This degradation can be caused by natural forces or, especially in modern times, anthropogenic factors. General causes of fragmentation include:

- The development of land around a protected area, even through the addition of a single road lane or fence line.
- The captivity, capture or killing of species in an area that links populations.
- The movement of a population away from other individuals of that species, such as the natural introduction of wolves and moose on Isle Royale.
- Geologic processes, such as landslides or volcanoes, dividing a habitat.
- Rising sea levels separating islands from what was once a common landmass.
- Global warming, especially when coupled with mountains, reducing movement from one habitat to another.

== Genetic effects ==
The consequences of population fragmentation are mostly genetic, contributing to various effects such as inbreeding depression, which leads to reduced genetic variability within fragmented populations. This reduction in variability decreases population fitness for several reasons. First, inbreeding increases competition among closely related individuals, lowering the evolutionary fitness of the species as a whole. Second, reduced genetic variability increases the likelihood that lethal homozygous recessive traits will be expressed, which can decrease average litter size and further reduce population size.

Small populations are also more vulnerable to genetic drift, which leads to less and/or random fixation of alleles. As a result, this leads to higher levels of homozygosity and negatively affects individual fitness. Since individuals in small populations are more likely to be related, they are more likely to inbreed. The effectiveness of natural selection may be compromised as well, harming the performance of a species by allowing deleterious mutations to accumulate in these small populations. Because individuals in the small populations are more likely to be related, the likelihood of inbreeding also rises. Over time, the evolutionary potential of a species—and its ability to adapt to environmental changes, such as climate change—is decreased. Limited gene flow further constrains adaptation and can increase a species' susceptibility to extinction.

Depending on how severely fragmented a population is, the resulting genetic impacts will differ in severity. If a population is split into many, equal-sized populations, gene flow may be equal among all the populations. In other cases, movement of individuals and their genes may occur mostly between nearby fragmented populations, replicating a linear, stepping-stone-like design. This creates an uneven dispersal of genetic information across the broader range. More complex population arrangements, may mirror a source-sink dynamic, where a larger population serves as a source for a large number of small populations. In cases of significantly isolated fragmented populations, they may experience little to no gene flow, increasing their susceptibility to extinction. Overall, genetic consequences depend on how easily individuals can move among fragments and how consistently genes are exchanged over time.

While population bottlenecks resulting from fragmentation are generally expected to lower genetic diversity over time, some species experiencing these conditions are nevertheless able to maintain relatively high levels of genetic diversity. Fragmentation into multiple, smaller subpopulations, particularly when gene flow is low, can adequately preserve allelic richness—the number of alleles present in a population—although often at the expense of reduced heterozygosity.

Population fragmentation caused by habitat fragmentation has also been shown to increase genetic differentiation among subpopulations, as there is less gene flow due to physical separation.

== Proposed conservation solutions ==
Population fragmentation can result in reduced gene flow, increasing the risk for inbreeding depression and extinction overall. However, the implications of population fragmentation on conservation efforts requires further research. Gene flow, which is the transfer of genetic material from one population to another, leads to genetically and phenotypically similar organisms. Additionally, it can increase biodiversity in a population by introducing new alleles from various individuals. To reduce the effects, or prevent population fragmentation, researchers propose multiple solutions as it relates to human activity. First, they state that the removal of barriers (i.e., fencing, highways) could restore populations. This is especially relevant for urban areas, where building infrastructure can physically prevent back-and-forth movement between habitats, forcing them to relocate or even form new populations. However, barrier removal is not always possible, especially in rapidly urbanizing environments.

A second proposed solution is to maintain connectivity between habitats located beyond barriers, as well as high-quality habitats (i.e., climate control, reduced pollution levels). Researchers had aquatic species in mind when proposing these solutions and they may not have the same applications for terrestrial organisms. The effects of climate change may make it difficult to achieve these solutions without relevant legislation. Similarly, researchers from a separate study proposed resisting policies that support habitat fragmentation and controlling human access to habitats as to not disrupt them. Again, this may only be achievable through policy implementation. Lastly, understanding the implications of climate change and differing species can be impacted based on their ecological niche requires further research.

== Wildlife corridors ==
A major solution to consider when mitigating the effects of population fragmentation is a wildlife corridor. Wildlife corridors serve as designated connecting routes between fragmented landscapes, giving animals the ability to travel from one area to another. In doing so, they enable access to necessary resources, support and maintain gene flow, and allow for natural behaviors on which animals rely for survival. The efficacy of wildlife corridors depends on a number of factors, including their placement, width, and structural design. Research on migratory ungulates across the United States has shown that corridors positioned along previously established migratory designed as overpasses that resemble natural habitat tend to support higher crossing rates than enclosed structures. Studies also indicate that corridors must be adequately wide to accommodate natural movement patterns and reduce edge effects, and that regular maintenance of fencing and other guiding structures is necessary to ensure long-term functionality.

=== Case studies ===
Case studies from various regions demonstrate how wildlife corridors can lessen the impacts of population fragmentation.

- Banff National Park: Along the Trans-Canada Highway in Banff National Park, a system of wildlife overpasses and underpasses along the Trans-Canada Highway has become a prominent success story for restoring species connectivity in a heavily fragmented landscape. Since their construction, wildlife-vehicle collisions in the park have decreased by roughly 80%, and mortality for multiple species dropped by 50–100%. Genetic studies at the park have also demonstrated that these crossing structures restore population connectivity by enabling carnivores like grizzly and black bears to migrate, breed, and exchange genes across the roadway.
- Florida Panther Project: One of the first examples of constructing wildlife crossing structures to safeguard animals in the United States occurred on I-75 in Florida. This project succeeded in preventing panther deaths and facilitating the expansion of endangered panther populations through the construction of 23 underpass structures. Increased panther movement has allowed for more successful breeding, which results in gene flow and the persisting survival of the species.

== See also ==
- Gene flow
- Genetic erosion
- Habitat fragmentation
- Landscape ecology
- Metapopulation
- Patch dynamics
- Wildlife corridor
