= Mount Desor =

Mountain in United States of America

- Location within Michigan

Highest point
- Elevation: 1,394 ft (425 m)
- Prominence: 792 ft (241 m)
- Coordinates: 47°57′20″N 89°00′46″W

Geography
- Location: Isle Royale National Park, Keweenaw County, Michigan, U.S.
- Parent range: Superior Upland
- Topo map: USGS Sugar Mountain

Climbing
- Easiest route: Trail hike

Mount Desor is the tallest mountain within Isle Royale National Park. Located on Isle Royale in Lake Superior and with an elevation of 1,394 feet (420 m), it is the third highest peak on the lake.

The 45-mile-long (72 km) Greenstone Ridge Trail crosses the summit of Mount Desor as it traverses the length of the island. The summit is a 8.5-mile (13.7 km) hike from nearest ferry landing.

On an autumn day after most of the foliage has fallen, it is possible to see Lake Superior's Siskiwit Bay to the south. In other seasons, the view of the surrounding terrain from the densely wooded spot is limited.

== See also ==
- List of U.S. National Parks by Elevation
