= Cumberlandite =

Plutonic rock

Coordinates: 42°0′17.5″N 71°27′13″W

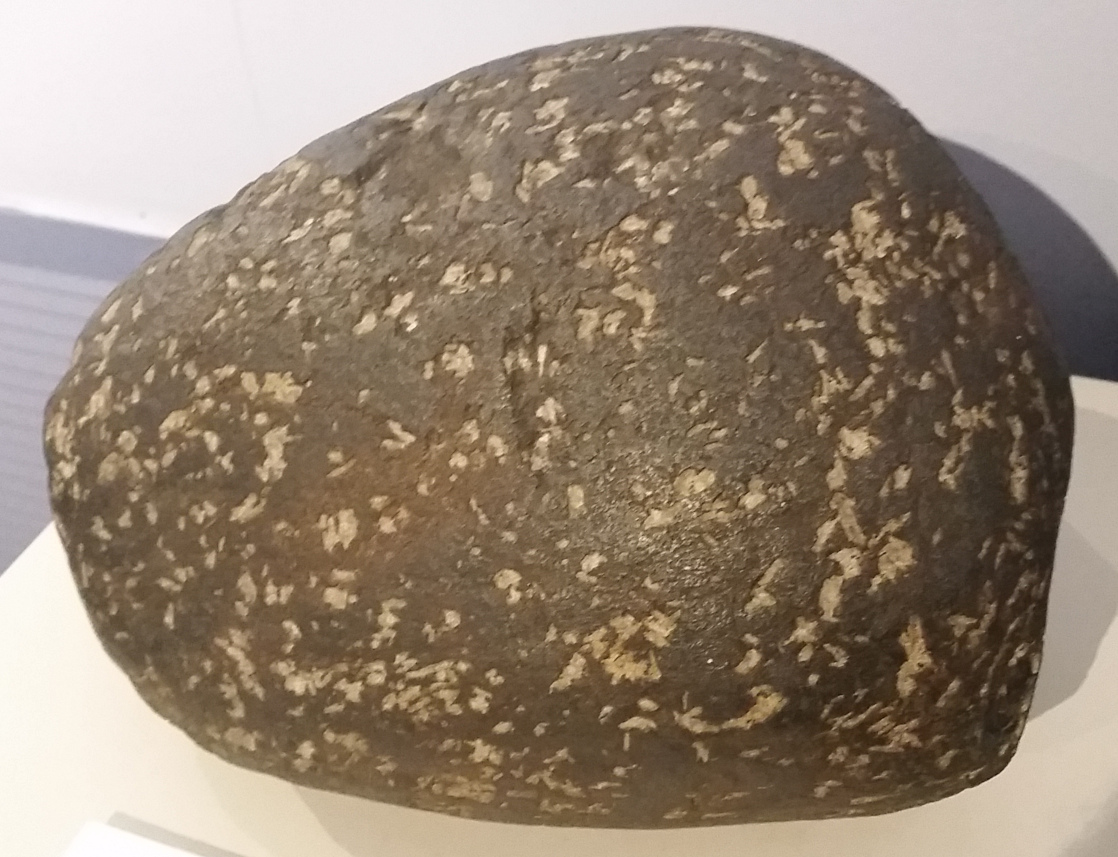
Specimen of cumberlandite on display at the Roger Williams Park Museum of Natural History and Planetarium. Specimen is approximately 1 foot (30 cm) wide.

Cumberlandite is a specific type of plutonic rock called a melanocratic troctolite, or melatroctolite. It is the state rock of Rhode Island and can be found in a 4-acre (0.016 km^{2}) lot in Cumberland, Rhode Island at Iron Mine Hill. Further traces can be found scattered throughout the Narragansett Bay watershed as far as Martha's Vineyard and Block Island. Cumberlandite is not exclusive to Rhode Island; it is also found in Taberg, Sweden. It is slightly ferrimagnetic due to its high concentration of iron.

== Background ==
Colonial settlers recognized its value as ore during the 18th and 19th centuries. Historical records reveal that it was smelted as early as 1703, and it was used in forging cannons during significant events such as the Siege of Louisbourg in 1745 and possibly the American Revolutionary War.

Cumberlandite weathers to a brownish black with white crystals and has secondary chlorite and saussurite. It is predominantly found in glacial deposits stretching from south of its origin to the southern shores of Narragansett. Cumberlandite is denser than common granites or metamorphic rocks. Its unique origin, distinct appearance, and ease of identification contributed to its selection as the Rhode Island state rock.

== Petrology ==
Cumberlandite is an uncommon mafic igneous rock known as a melanocratic troctolite, or by IUGS classification, titaniferous magnetite melatroctolite.

Bulk rock geochemistry shows the below analysis with trace Pb:

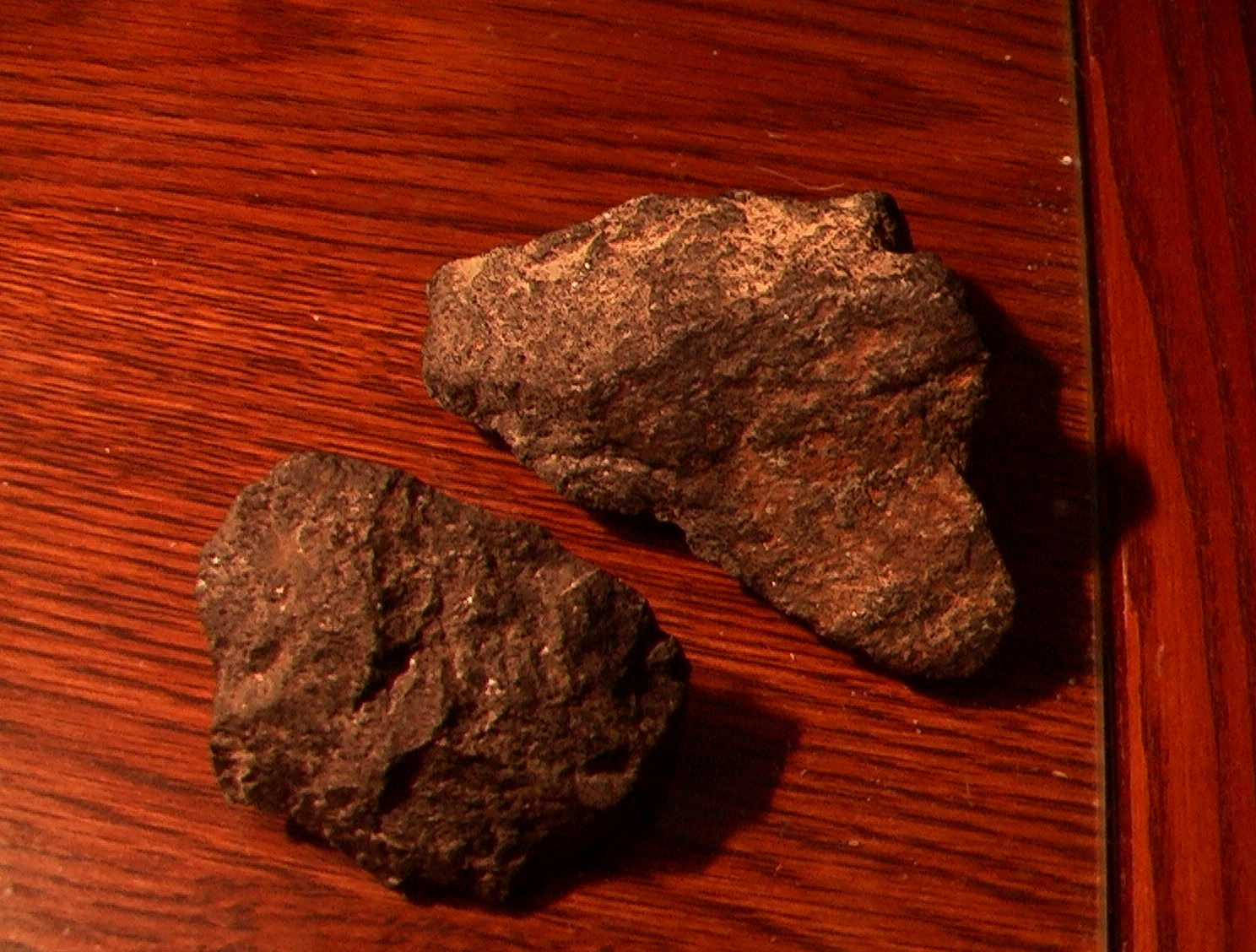
Two pieces of cumberlandite

Bulk Rock Geochemistry
Oxide	Weight %
SiO2	22.35
TiO2	9.75
Al2O3	5.26
MgO	16.10
Fe2O3	14.05
FeO	28.84
MnO	0.43
CaO	1.17
Na2O	0.44
K2O	0.10
P2O5	0.02
V2O3	0.18
S	0.38
Zn	0.71
Cu	0.08
CO & Ni	0.08
H2O	0.42
CO2	0.02
Sum	100.38

Troctolites are unusual olivine-rich pyroxene-poor gabbros common in layered mafic intrusions believed to have formed as cumulates in a magma chamber. Cumberlandite has light phenocrysts of labradorite in a dark, fine to medium-grained matrix of magnetite, ilmenite, olivine, and hercynite spinel. Magnetite and ilmenite cumulates are also common in layered intrusions and these minerals can account for up to 70 percent of the rock's volume contributing to the rock's high density and magnetism. The preferred orientation of the plagioclase crystals gives the rock a lamination.

In Rhode Island, the rock is part of the Esmond-Dedham Subterrane with an uncertain age ranging widely from Late Proterozoic to around the Devonian. He-Magnetite dating suggest an improbable age of 1.5Ga. Given its chemical composition and the presence of inclusions from a nearby gabbro, experts believe the rock is mid-Paleozoic.
