= International Wolf Center =

Non-profit organization in Minnesota, US

Coordinates: 47°54′20.73″N 91°49′40.13″W

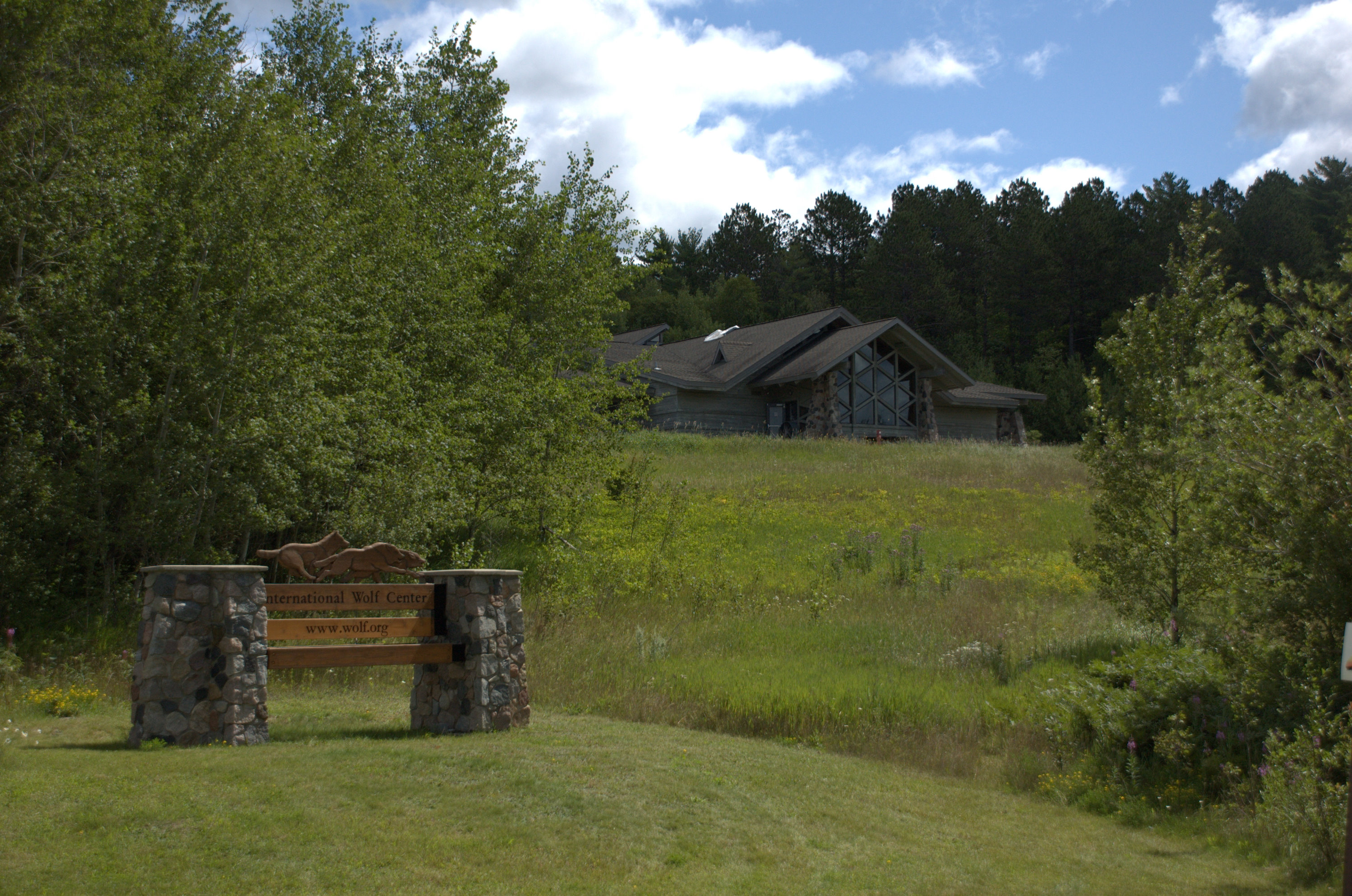
IWC Entrance

The International Wolf Center (IWC) is a research and educational organization based near Ely, Minnesota, United States focused on wolves and their ecology. The Wolf Center operates an interpretive center in Ely open to the public, where visitors can view captive "ambassador wolves" in natural surroundings through large windows, and can learn about wolves through a variety of exhibits and programs. This organization lies within Superior National Forest. It also sponsors research symposia and offsite educational programs, publishes International Wolf magazine, and provides information about wolves via its website.

In response to wolf controversies, the Wolf Center does not take a stand on how wolves should be managed (such as by hunting or trapping), as long as healthy wolf populations are maintained. Its policy is to provide the most accurate, up-to-date information possible about wolves and let people make their own decisions.

== Exhibits and activities ==
Founded in 1985 by a group of biologists led by wolf biologist Dr. L. David Mech, the International Wolf Center opened in June 1993. The Wolf Center is housed in a 17,000-square-foot (1,600 m^{2}) facility near Ely, Minnesota and features gray wolves (Canis lupus) viewable through large windows that allow visitors to watch the wolves communicate, hunt, eat and play. Visitors have the opportunity to view a 1.25-acre (5,100 m^{2}) enclosure that is home to an Exhibit Pack of ambassador wolves, representing several North American subspecies, including Arctic, Northwestern, and Great Plains. The Center introduces new wolf pups every four years.

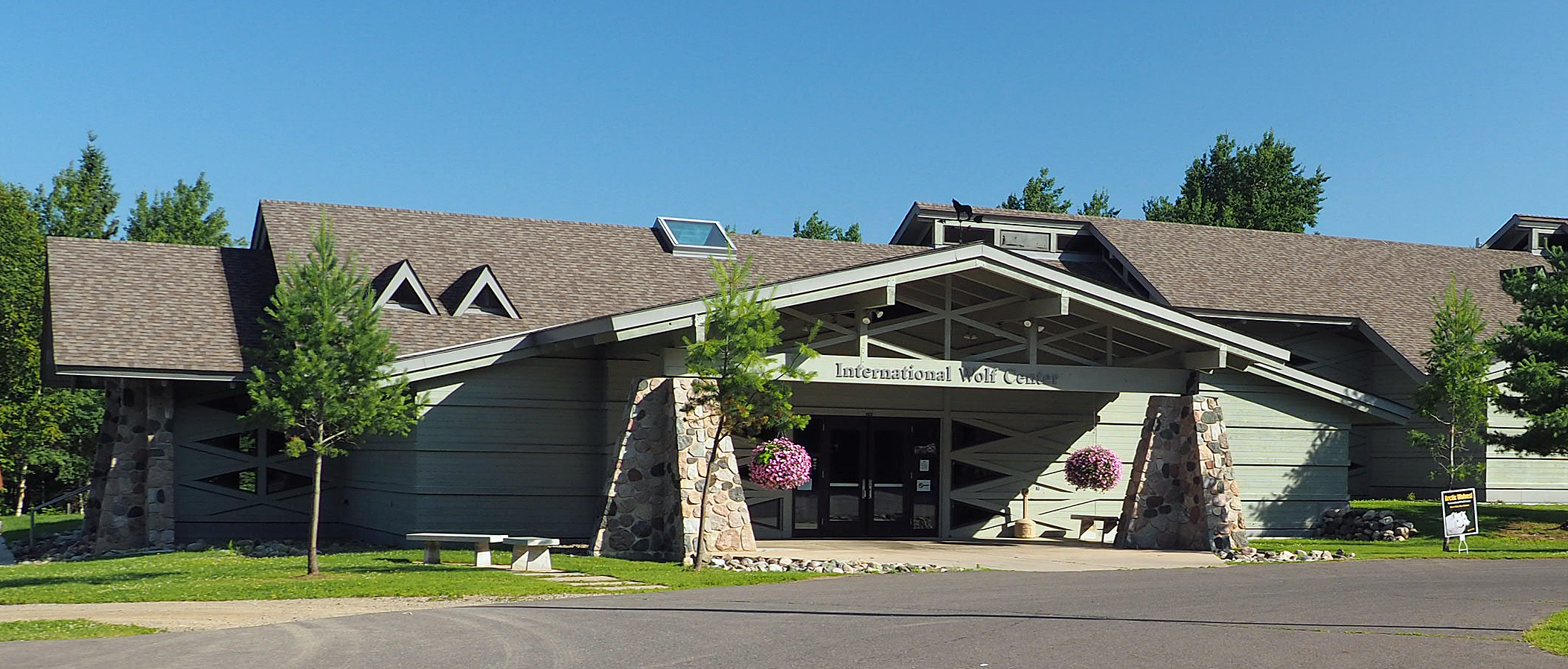
IWC Building

In addition to the on-site wolves, the Center offers various educational programs at its Ely interpretive facility, as well as wolf hot spots in northern Minnesota. Afternoon, weekend and week-long programs include howling trips, snowshoe treks, radio tracking, family activities, dog sledding, videos, presentations, demonstrations and hikes. The Center also houses a new Discover Wolves! exhibit, the Little Wolf exhibit designed specifically for children ages three to nine, a theater for watching documentaries on a variety of wolf-related topics, and a "Wolf Den" store.

International Wolf magazine is published quarterly by the International Wolf Center. The publication is free to members of the International Wolf Center, and selected articles from each issue are available online.

To help accomplish its mission, the International Wolf Center provides a support program for educators, including distance learning opportunities as part of the "WolfLink" initiative that brings the center into hundreds of classrooms each year.

The center sponsored a video game called WolfQuest, which has been developed by the Minnesota Zoo. WolfQuest is an educational computer game that is intended to teach children and teens about the life of a wild wolf in Yellowstone National Park. Two episodes have been released thus far; WolfQuest: Amethyst Mountain, and WolfQuest: Slough Creek.
