= Wolves and moose on Isle Royale =

Predator-prey relationship

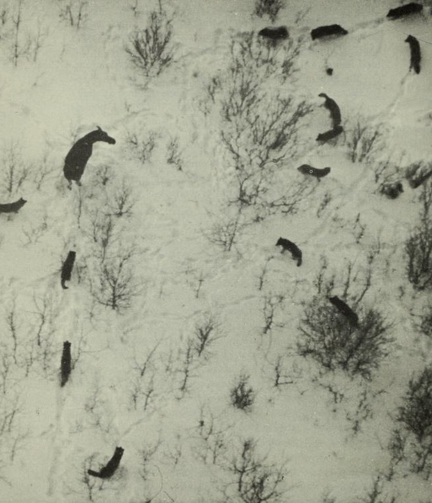
A pack of wolves hunting a moose on Isle Royale, 1966

The single predator-single prey relationship between wolves and moose on Isle Royale in Lake Superior is unique, and has been the subject of detailed study since 1958. Isle Royale, the principal island of Isle Royale National Park in Michigan in the United States, is an isolated island with little migration of animals into and out of the island, and as a U.S. national park, human interaction and impact on the two species is also limited. Both the wolves and the moose first became established populations on Isle Royale in the 1900s. The populations of both moose and wolves have shown repeated spikes and declines and have not settled to a balanced relationship. The moose populations have ranged from 500 to 2500 while the number of wolves has ranged from almost 50 to down to two. From 2018 to 2019, 19 wolves were released at Isle Royale in hopes of bringing stability to the ecosystem, and as of 2020, there are estimated to be 14 wolves remaining on the island.

The relationship between wolves and moose on Isle Royale has been the subject of the longest predator-prey research study, begun in 1958. The wolves have been subject to inbreeding and carry a spinal deformity. As of the 2014 count, there were only 9 wolves on the island, with the 2015–2017 counts showing only 2. A review completed in 2014 determined that new wolves would not be introduced into the park to attempt a genetic rescue, but as of December 2016, the National Park Service had instead decided to introduce 20 to 30 wolves to the island. In 2018, three females and one male wolf from Minnesota were transferred to the island system.

Isle Royale National Park is made up of about 400 islands, and is in the northwest portion of Lake Superior. It is about 50 miles (80 km) from Michigan's shore, and 12 miles (19 km) from the Canadian shore. The main island is about 45 miles (72 km) long, and nine miles (14 km) wide at the widest point, with an area of 205 square miles (530 km^{2}). There are no roads, and no motorized vehicles are allowed on the island. The park is closed from September to May, during which the wolf-moose study personnel are the only human residents on the island.

== Wolf-moose dynamics interactions ==
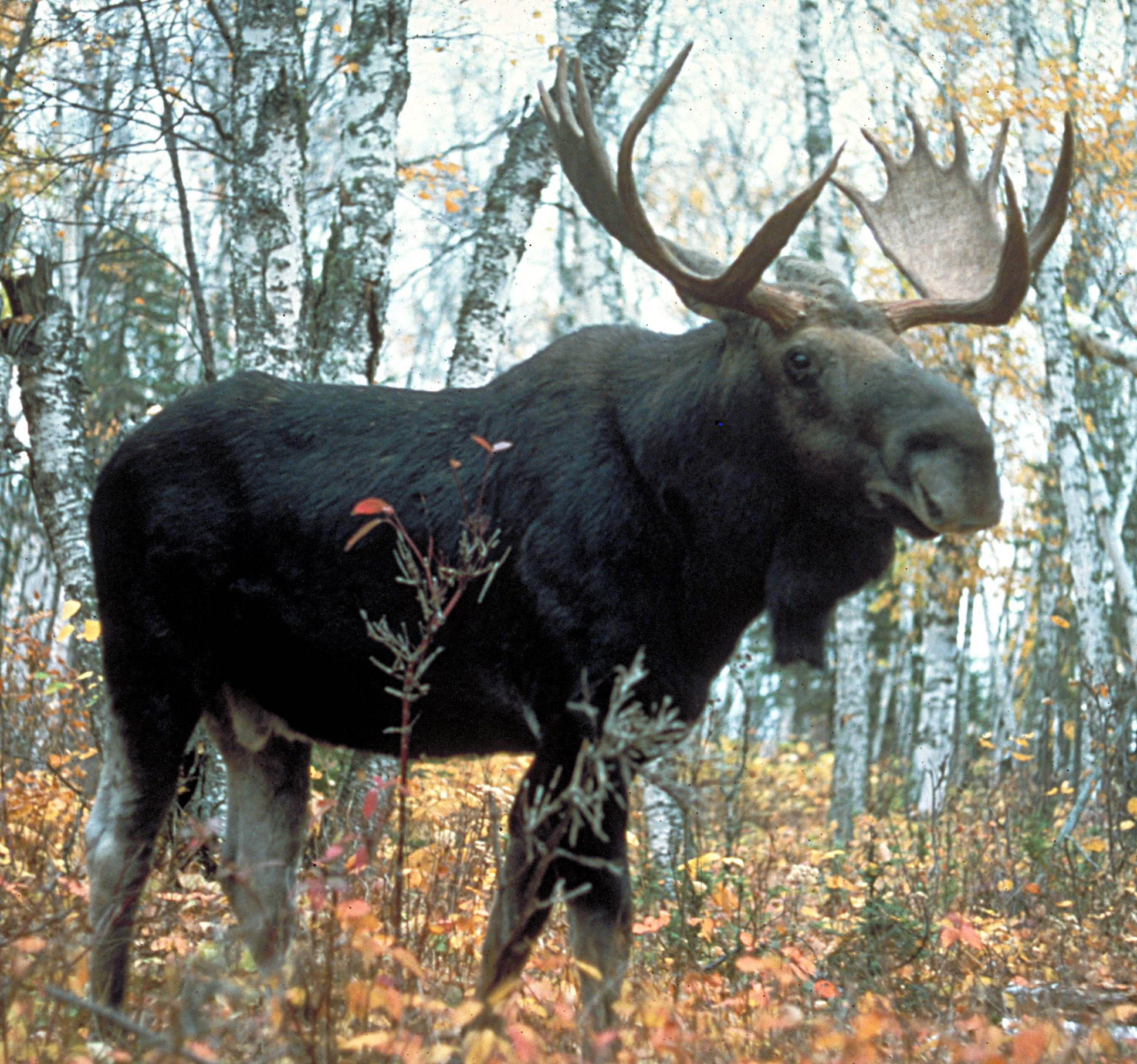
Moose health and population on Isle Royale have a great effect on other animal and plant life.

As an isolated island, Isle Royale initially had neither wolves nor moose. The moose are believed to have either swum across Lake Superior from Minnesota in the early 1900s or were stocked on the island by humans for the purpose of recreational hunting. In 1949 a few wolves, possibly only a single pair, crossed an ice bridge from Ontario to the island during a harsh winter. But because only one pair of wolves migrated to the island, they have suffered from severe inbreeding. According to Rolf Peterson, a professor at Michigan Technological University and the lead wolf-moose researcher, "Moose were isolated here 100 years ago. Most of the genes are still here, but they have enough population (to compensate). There are so few wolves that they have lost genetic variability. The scientific dogma suggests that they are not going to make it." In fact, all of the wolves' DNA on Isle Royale can be traced back to one ancestor. Inbreeding leads to inbreeding depression and fitness problems, often accompanied by violent social rejection by other wolves.

When the study began in 1958, many researchers believed the two species would eventually reach a population equilibrium of about 25 wolves and 1,500 moose; but there has been no sign of this, with populations fluctuating unpredictably. The highest number of moose observed since the arrival of wolves was 2,450 in 1995. The highest number of wolves observed was 50 in 1980 followed by a population crash to 14 by 1982. As of 2005, there were 540 moose, the lowest recorded, and a relatively high population of 30 wolves. In 2008, there were 700 moose and 23 wolves.

The density of the two species depends strongly on the density of forage. Moose prefer birch and aspen trees, which used to grow plentifully on the island, but over a century of moose browsing have been largely replaced by the less nutritious balsam fir, which now makes up 59% of a moose's diet. Even this has declined dramatically: as of 2002, understory growth of balsam fir was at 5%, down 40% from 19th century observations. The plant is more plentiful on the east side of the island, which draws a higher concentration of moose. Because balsam fir does not give sufficient moisture, moose have recently been spotted eating snow, a very rare occurrence. They have also been sighted eating lichen, which researcher Rolf Peterson has compared to eating dust. When the moose population grows too high, the balsam fir population crashes, leading to a crash in the moose population, in a continuing population "see-saw". Moose mostly die from the consequences of malnutrition: they become emaciated and slowed down by arthritis, until they are easy prey for a wolf pack. Also, calves suffer from malnutrition when they are born during a winter with snow too deep for easy foraging.

Moose make up nine-tenths of an Isle Royale wolf's diet (the remainder being snowshoe hare and beaver). Moose in their prime years commonly outrun wolves in a hunt, especially on soft snow: moose can cross snow two feet deep at 20 mph (32 km/h). Even if wolves can catch up to a moose, they cannot always bring it down; researchers often find wolves with hunting bruises and scars. To improve their chances, wolves pick out moose which are calves, old, diseased, or injured. The typical moose killed is about 12 years old and suffers from arthritis, osteoporosis, and/or periodontitis. Eighty to ninety percent of moose are brought down by wolves rather than directly by disease, and each wolf kills an average of between 0.44 and 1.69 moose per month.

== Wolf population dynamics ==
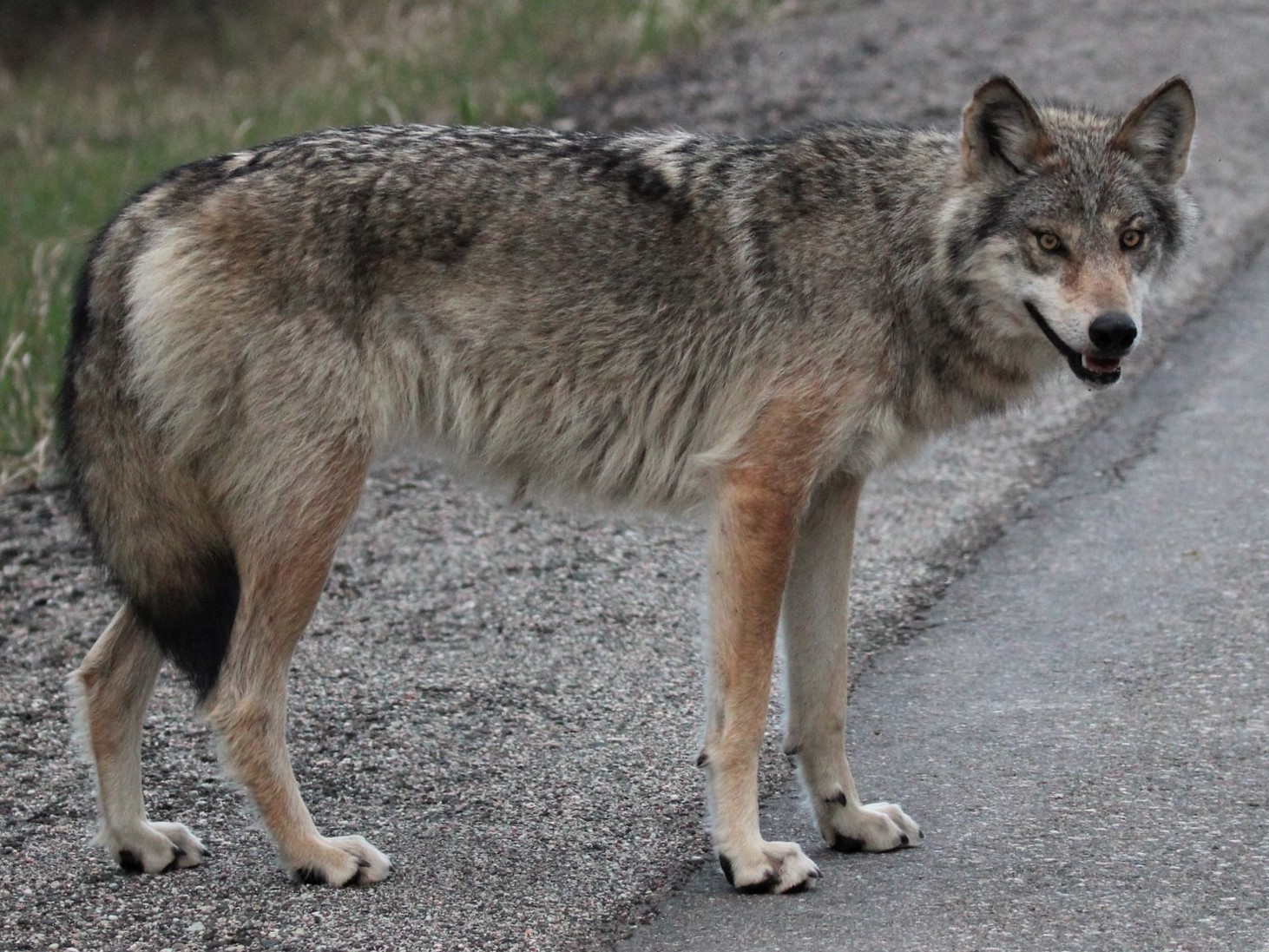
The wolf is the prominent predator on Isle Royale.

Wolves on the island have, historically, been separated into three or four packs, with each pack usually having between three and eight members, including two or three pups. The number of wolves in a pack depends mainly on the amount of snow that fell in the previous winter. In winters with light snow, pups tend to leave the pack to find mates, so packs run at four or five members; in heavily snowy winters, the pups stay with the pack, which can reach ten to twelve members. If many members of a pack die, the pack dissolves and a new one forms within a year. One pack will dissolve about once every thirty years.

In 2006, the wolf population, with the exception of 10 loners and separate pairs, formed three packs; the East pack, the Middle pack, and the Chippewa Harbor pack. Wolf packs on the island have been known to fight to try to extend their territory and, thus, supply of moose. In 2006, the East pack killed Chippewa Harbor pack's alpha male, as witnessed by John Vucetich, a professor at Michigan Technological University and one of the lead researchers on the island, who believed that the Chippewa Harbor pack may die off without their leader.

=== Old Gray Guy ===
In early 1997, a particularly virile male wolf that had not been born on Isle Royale was observed by researchers on the island. This was the first time that an adult wolf had entered the island's isolated population since the study began, and he is assumed to have crossed over the ice from mainland Ontario, 15 miles away. The wolf, designated M93 by Isle Royale researchers and later nicknamed "Old Gray Guy" because of his pale fur, was larger and more territorial than the other Isle Royale wolves. Old Gray Guy's pack grew to an unusually large 10 wolves, and drove one of the other four packs to extinction. Over the course of eight years of breeding, the wolf produced 34 pups, which in turn produced an additional 45 pups. It was determined that by 2009, 56% of the wolves on Isle Royale were descended from Old Gray Guy.

Scientists expected that the introduction of Old Gray Guy's genes to an inbred population would create a "genetic rescue" population boom, but the overall wolf population did not substantially increase over time. In an interview with The New York Times in 2011, wolf researcher John A. Vucetich said that this should not be taken as evidence against the "genetic rescue" theory, suggesting that other factors may have kept the wolf population from growing further and that the Isle Royale population may have disappeared entirely if Old Gray Guy had never arrived. Furthermore, Old Gray Guy's offspring soon began breeding with one another, leading a new set of traits to become reinforced by heavy inbreeding. A 2023 study found that Old Gray Guy's impact on the gene pool had been partially reversed as his inbred descendants died without offspring.

== Trends ==
Initially, it was thought that the wolf and moose populations would reach a stable balance. However, during the nearly sixty years of the study, the populations of both species have fluctuated up and down with the number of moose ranging from a high of nearly 2500 down to 500 and the number of wolves ranging from a high of 50 down to one in 2017/18.

During 2016, the wolf population was nearly extirpated with only two severely inbred wolves present. The moose population was about 2/3rd of its historical maximum with ample forage and growing rapidly. Absent a new infusion of migrant wolves, or human intervention, the original situation of a high moose population limited only by starvation is the prospect.

In December 2016, the National Park Service (NPS) put forward a plan in which they would add 20 to 30 wolves to the island in order to prevent the pack from disappearing completely.

In December 2017, Sarah Hoy et al. of Michigan Technological University published results of a 40-year study showing a decrease in the size and lifespans of moose. Analysis of moose skulls documents a 16% shrinkage likely consistent with warming winters which are correlated with smaller brain size in one-year-old moose. The moose population has tripled in the past decade, reaching about 1,600 in the 2017 survey, but as wolf die off approaches, competition for food due to overpopulation will become a further stress on moose.

In March 2018, with the release of the final Environmental Impact Statement, the NPS formally proposed to relocate 20 to 30 wolves to the island over a three-year time period, starting immediately. An official Record of Decision was released on 7 June 2018 selecting this preferred alternative over several others including taking no action, introducing wolves over a longer 20-year period, and delaying immediate action but allowing for the possibility of future action after the continued monitoring of moose population metrics. By June 2018, the NPS was actively developing specific implementation strategies. By the end of 2018, three females and a male were trapped in Minnesota and relocated to the park, with more to come. Over the following months the newly introduced male wolf died and one of the females left the island via an ice bridge. In early 2019 eleven more wolves were trapped in Canada and released in the park. Three of the fifteen wolves on the island appeared to be forming a new pack in late 2019. As many as 14 wolves were on the island as of April 2020. At least two new pups were noticed in September 2020. After the 2021–2022 winter study, researchers estimated there were 28 wolves.

== Other species ==
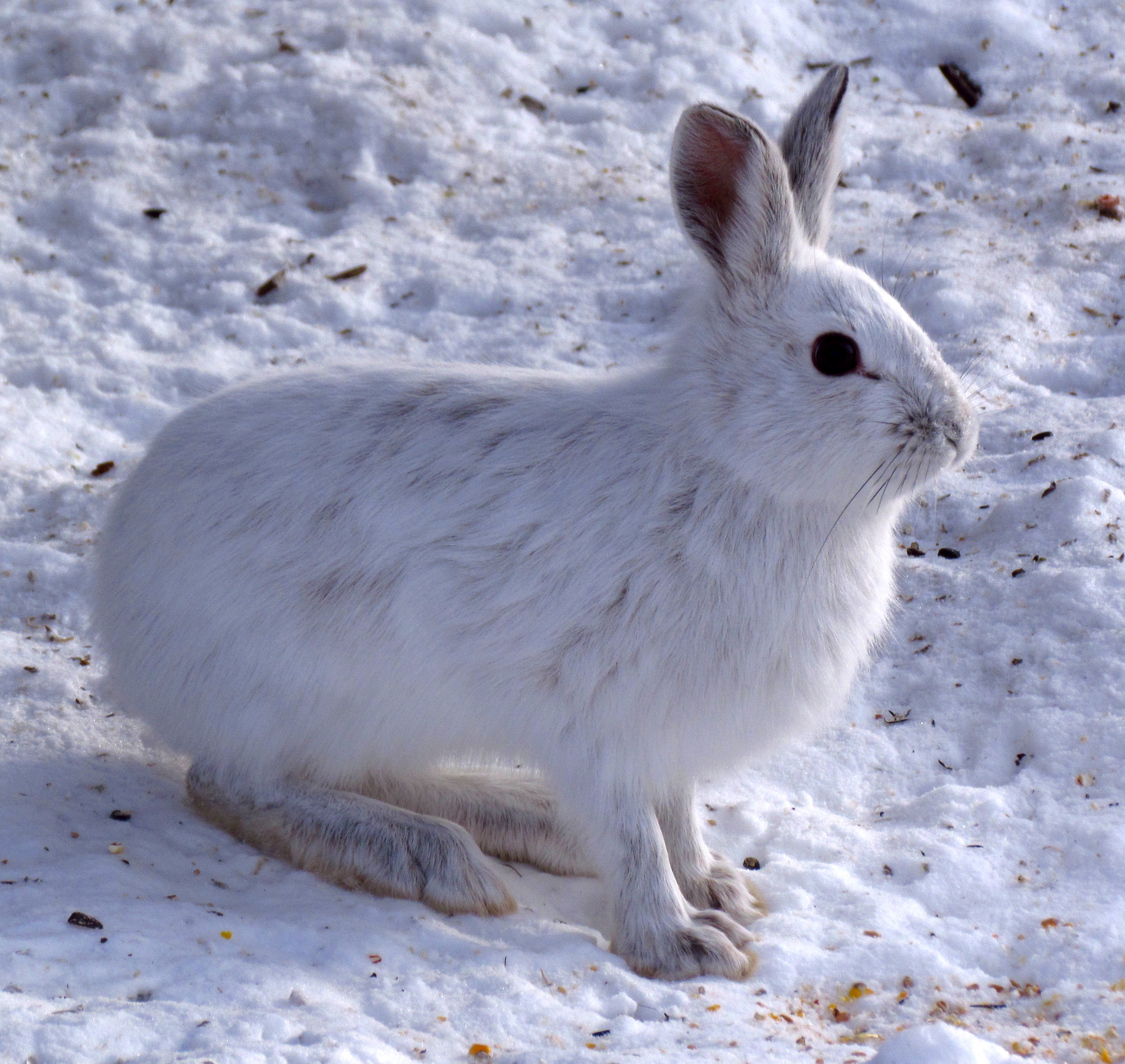
A snowshoe hare, one of the other species impacting the wolf and moose on Isle Royale.

Once a moose is brought down and killed, wolves have to compete with scavenging ravens. Ravens are tenacious scavengers that can easily dodge the strike of a wolf and are unbothered by them. Ravens can eat and store up to two pounds (0.91 kg) in a few days, which is minuscule compared to the storage capacity of wolves, which is up to eighteen pounds (8.2 kg) in just a few hours.

Other anti-social species have an effect, though rather small, on the relationship between wolves and moose on Isle Royale. Before wolves hunted them to extinction, coyotes used to inhabit the island. Beavers and snowshoe hares also have an effect on both populations, because beavers and snowshoe hares are the only two animals that wolves prey on excluding moose, constituting a tenth of an Isle Royale wolf's diet. The beaver population has sharply declined since the arrival of wolves, but they still are present, and though they are not a prime food source for typical wolves, they are the second to moose as the most consumed animal by the wolves on the island. Beavers benefit both species. They are as easy prey for wolves and they create aquatic macrophytes, very nutritional plants for moose, although the macrophytes are also consumed by the beavers. Though wolves are thought to contribute to the decline in beaver, researchers believe that the decline of aspen, the primary food source of beavers, which used to be plentiful, could have led to their decrease. Beavers have been exposed to predation by having to travel long distances to find the only parts of the island where aspen remains.

Snowshoe hares, the third most consumed animal by wolves on Isle Royale constitute a very small portion of the wolves' diet, because snowshoe hares are so difficult to catch. Researchers have found that wolves do not show much interest in preying on hares, and only feed on them incidentally. Snowshoe hares have a negative effect on moose as they eat some of the same vegetation that moose eat, which only contributes to the decline in appropriate forage for moose. The red fox is yet another animal that inhabits Isle Royale; red foxes mainly feed on snowshoe hares and occasionally scavenge on moose, or any other meat a wolf leaves behind. Wolves do not commonly hunt foxes, though wolves have been observed killing foxes when they attempt to feed on an animal carcass.

== Climate effects ==
Climate plays a major role in the moose-wolf relationship as well. Since El Niño hit in 1998, the climate has warmed up, which has significantly affected the moose population across North America. The warmer climate in recent years has produced more Moose winter ticks, which consume the blood of animals, making them more susceptible to anemia, and induce the moose to scratch off their hair, exposing them to hypothermia in cold weather. A moose can have tens of thousands of ticks feeding on its blood at one time, each sucking up to one milliliter of blood. The biting ticks cause a lot of discomfort for the moose, so they try to get the ticks off their bodies by biting off their hair, and rubbing up against trees. This preoccupies moose, and keeps them from browsing for food, which can lead to malnutrition. Compounded with blood loss, moose weakened by ticks are easier for wolves to kill. Ticks are more prominent in years where spring arrives earlier than usual, because when they fall on ground not covered in snow, then they can reproduce. Otherwise, they die out. Then, if the summer is hot, ticks are able to reproduce at a higher rate. Hot summers also lead to moose resting in the shade, or in the water to keep cool, making them easier prey for wolves. Also, hot summers lead to tougher foraging for moose which makes them less prepared and more vulnerable to the winter.

Not only has the recent warming of Isle Royale hurt the moose, but completely opposite problems harm them also. Harsh winters pose significant problems to moose, because moose have problems finding food when there is too much snow on the ground. The less snow there is, the more freely moose can move around the island. When there is a significant amount of snow, moose stay in conifer swamps, making them easier prey for wolves, because they are more confined, and immobilized due to the snow. Deep or heavy snow decreases the speed and agility of moose that is necessary to evade wolf attacks, and calves born during a winter with particularly deep snow are more vulnerable to being weaker prey for wolves later on in their lives because of foraging problems that occur when the snow is deep. The keen survival instincts of moose have been clearly evident from the studying of their actions on Isle Royale. Female moose (called "cows") have been spotted on nearby smaller islands, around the main island of Isle Royale, because they swim across to give birth. This allows for them to give birth and raise their young without the threat of wolves preying on their young when they are vulnerable. This also causes trouble for moose that are born in the winter, because they can no longer swim across the water to another island, and must raise the new calf in the snow. Once the calves are physically mature, they are able to swim back, and are then able to better protect themselves from wolves, as they are then in their prime years.

== Studies ==
In 1958, as a graduate student at Purdue University, L. David Mech began studying the wolves of Isle Royale. One of the first publications on the subject of the wolves on the Island of Isle Royale was the book "The Wolves of Isle Royale" by Mech, which led to the prominence of both the author and the topic. The book was published in 1966 by the Department of the Interior, having evolved from his doctoral thesis. Mech's project would become the world's longest-running predator-prey study.

== Bibliography ==
- "Food Fight: Wolves Pack Up to Out-Eat Ravens." Ascribe Higher Education News Service (August 19, 2004): NA.
- The Moose of Isle Royale, (1934). Adolph Murie. Ann Arbor: University of Michigan, Museum of Zoology, Misc. Publication No. 25. Study of the moose population before the wolves arrived.
