= Mozarkite =

State rock of Missouri

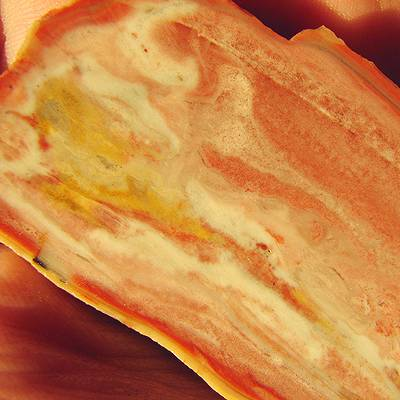
Mozarkite

Mozarkite is a form of chert (flint). It is the state rock of Missouri. The name is a portmanteau, formed from Mo (Missouri), zark (Ozarks), and ite (meaning rock).

Mozarkite consists essentially of silica (quartz - SiO_{2}) with varying amounts of chalcedony. It has won distinction as a particular form or variety of chert because of its unique variation of colors and its ability to take a high polish. It has the hardness of 7-7.5 on the Mohs scale, which qualifies it as a suitable material for semi-precious gemstone, and has a density of about 2.65 g/cm^{3}. Typically, the colors are different hues of red, pink, and purple with varying tints of green, gray and brown. It is collected and admired by lapidarists across the country.

Interest in collecting mozarkite in Missouri started in the early 1950s, in Benton County, Missouri. It is found primarily in west-central Missouri, south of the Missouri River, and west of the Lake of the Ozarks. Mozarkite occurs in the Cotter Dolomite of Ordovician age, which means it is some 450 million years old. It is found in residual boulders in the soil on hill slopes, along ditches, and in roadcuts where the boulders are exposed in the soil formed by weathering of the Cotter Dolomite.

== State Rock ==
- Mozarkite was designated the official state rock of Missouri by the 74th Missouri General Assembly in 1967.
