= Nelsonite =

Igneous rock

- Igneous rock
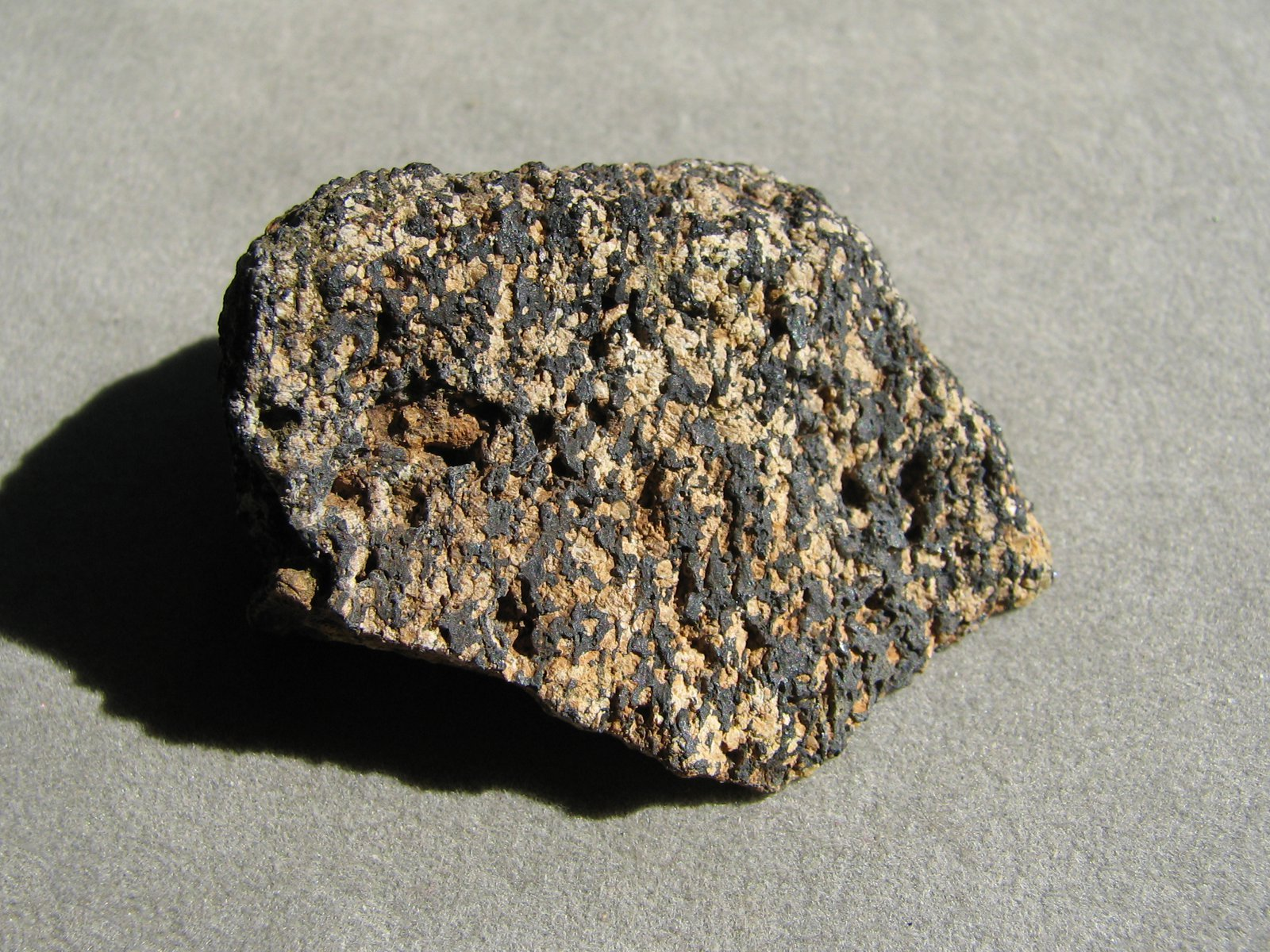
- Nelsonite from Nelson County, Virginia

Composition
- Ilmenite and apatite

Identification
Formula	FeO.TiO_{2}.nFe_{2}O_{3} Ca_{3}(F,Cl)(PO_{4})_{3}
Hardness	5 - 6
Specific gravity	3.7 - 4.1 bulk; ilmenite: 4.5-5.0
Streak	ilmenite: black to brownish-red apatite: white
Color	black metallic and light-colored
Habit	even-granular texture
Luster	metallic to sub-metallic
Fracture	conchoidal
Tenacity	brittle
Texture	holocrystalline

Nelsonite is an igneous rock primarily constituted of ilmenite and apatite, with anatase, chlorite, phosphosiderite, talc, or wavellite appearing as minor components. Rocks are equigranular with a grain size around 2–3 mm. The black ilmenite is slightly magnetic while the whitish apatite is not.

== Name ==
It was named for Nelson County, Virginia, and is also found in that state's Amherst and Roanoke counties. In 2016, the Virginia legislature designated it as the official State Rock of Virginia.

== Use ==
At one time, it was mined for the primary extraction of titanium dioxide. Titanium dioxide from ilmenite is used as a white paint pigment, and in the early 1900s as a colorant of artificial teeth. The calcium phosphate from apatite is used as agricultural fertilizer. While no active mining of nelsonite occurs in Virginia, active mining occurs in parts of China for rare-earth elements.

== Formation ==
Anorthosite-related nelsonite occurs mainly as veins and lensoidal intrusions in anorthosite complex or wall rocks. Magma liquids rich in iron, titanium, and phosphorus formed immiscible and eutectic mixtures crystallizing around 850–1000 °C followed by intense fractionation. Disagreement exists on the role liquid immiscibility plays in generating nelsonite and Fe–Ti oxides ore. It is not common to have such relatively large density differentials of mineral constituents as seen in nelsonite; ilmenite (4.7–5.2 g/cm^{3}) and apatite (~3.5 g/cm^{3}). Nelsonites experience differential weathering. Exposed apatite within the nelsonite is readily removed through solution by meteoric waters that can result in a cellular or sponge-like ilmenite mass.

== Occurrence ==
Nelsonites are generally associated with anorthosite intrusions and are scarce worldwide. Nelsonite occurs at various localities, including Nelson, Amherst, and Roanoke Counties, VA; Carthage and Cheney Pond, NY; Laramie, WV; Washington State; Quebec, Canada; and China.

=== Roseland–Piney River district, Virginia ===
Nelsonite occurs in alkalic Roseland anorthosite, and in gneiss, granulite, and charnockitic rocks surrounding the anorthosite. Multiple varieties of equigranular nelsonite are present in the Roseland–Piney River district.

- Ilmenite nelsonite: the most abundant variety; commonly occurs in marginal parts of the anorthosite and in surrounding rocks near the anorthosite contact.
- Rutile nelsonite: occurs only within the anorthosite.
- Magnetite and biotite nelsonite: limited to the rocks surrounding the Roseland anorthosite.
- Hornblende nelsonite
- Gabbro-nelsonite: a rock intermediate in composition between gabbro and nelsonite

The prefixes ilmenite, rutile, magnetite, biotite, and hornblende denote special richness of the rocks in these minerals.
