= List of U.S. state minerals, rocks, stones and gemstones =

Leaders of states in the U.S. which have significant mineral deposits often create a state mineral, rock, stone or gemstone to promote interest in their natural resources, history, tourism, etc. Not every state has an official state mineral, rock, stone and/or gemstone, however.

In the chart below, a year which is listed within parentheses represents the year during which that mineral, rock, stone or gemstone was officially adopted as a state symbol or emblem.

== Table of minerals, rocks, stones and gemstones ==
| State, federal district, territory | Mineral | Rock or stone | Gemstone |
|---|---|---|---|
| Alabama | Hematite (1967) | Marble (1969) | Star blue quartz (1990) |
| Alaska | Gold (1968) | | Nephrite jade (1968) |
| Arizona | Wulfenite (2017) | | Turquoise (1974) |
| Arkansas | Quartz (1967) | Bauxite (1967) | Diamond (1967) |
| California^{[A]} | Gold (1965); California's nickname is the Golden State | Serpentinite (1965) | Benitoite (1985) |
| Colorado^{[B]} | Rhodochrosite (2002) | Yule marble (2004) | Aquamarine (1971) |
| Connecticut | Almandine garnet (1977) | | |
| Delaware | Sillimanite (1977) | | |
| Florida^{[C]} | | Agatized Coral (1979) | Moonstone (1970) |
| Georgia | Staurolite (1976) | | Quartz (1976) |
| Hawaiʻi | | | Black coral (1987) |
| Idaho | | | Star garnet (1967) |
| Illinois | Fluorite (1965) | Dolostone (2022) | |
| Indiana | | Salem limestone (1971) | |
| Iowa | | Geode (1967) | |
| Kansas | Galena (2018) | Greenhorn Limestone, from which the Kansas Stone Posts were cut. (2018) | Jelenite, a form of amber (2018) |
| Kentucky | Calcite (2024) | Kentucky agate (2000) | Freshwater pearl (1986) |
| Louisiana | Agate (2011) | | Lapearlite (Eastern oyster shell) (2011) |
| Maine | Tourmaline (1971) | Granitic pegmatite (2023) | |
| Maryland | Chromite (2025) | | Patuxent River stone agate (2004) |
| Massachusetts^{[D]} | Babingtonite (1971) | Roxbury puddingstone (1983) | Rhodonite (1979) |
| Michigan | | Petoskey stone fossilized coral (1965) | Chlorastrolite (aka Isle Royale greenstone) (1972) |
| Minnesota | | | Lake Superior agate (1969) |
| Mississippi | | Petrified wood (1976) | Mississippi Opal (2023) |
| Missouri | Galena (1967); Missouri's nickname is the Lead State | Mozarkite (1967) | |
| Montana | | | Sapphire (1969) and Montana Agate (1969) |
| Nebraska | | Prairie agate (1967) | Blue chalcedony (1967) |
| Nevada | Metal: Silver (1977); Nevada's nickname is the Silver State | Sandstone (1987) | Precious Gemstone: Virgin Valley black fire opal (1987) Semiprecious Gemstone: Nevada turquoise (1987) |
| New Hampshire | Beryl (1985) | Granite (1985); New Hampshire's nickname is the Granite State | Smoky quartz (1985) |
| New Jersey | Franklinite (2023) | | |
| New Mexico | | | Turquoise (1967) |
| New York | | | Garnet (1969) |
| North Carolina | Gold (2011) | | Emerald (1973) |
| North Dakota | | Knife River Flint (2025) | |
| Ohio | | | Ohio flint (1965) |
| Oklahoma | Crystal: Hourglass selenite (2005) | Barite Rose (1968) | |
| Oregon^{[E]} | State Twin Minerals: Oregonite (2013) and Josephinite (2013) | Thunderegg (1965) | Oregon sunstone labradorite (1987) |
| Pennsylvania | | | |
| Rhode Island | Bowenite serpentine (1966) | Cumberlandite (1966) | |
| South Carolina | | Blue granite (1969) | Amethyst (1969) |
| South Dakota | Rose quartz (1966) | | Fairburn agate (1966) and State Jewelry: Black Hills Gold |
| Tennessee | Agate (2009) | Limestone (from 1979 to present) and formerly Tennessee agate (from 1969 until 2009) | Tennessee River Pearl (1979) |
| Texas | Precious Metal: Silver (2007) | Oligocene petrified palmwood (1969) | Gemstone: Texas blue topaz (1969) Gem Cut: "Lone Star Cut" (1977) |
| Utah | Copper (1994) | Coal (1991) | Topaz (1969) |
| Vermont | Talc (1991) | Granite (1992) and Marble (1992) and Slate (1992) | Grossular garnet (1991) |
| Virginia | | Nelsonite (2016) | |
| Washington | | | Petrified wood (1975) |
| West Virginia^{[F]} | | Bituminous coal (2009) | Mississippian Lithostrotionella fossil coral (1990) |
| Wisconsin | Galena (1971) | Red granite (1971) | |
| Wyoming | | | Wyoming nephrite jade (1967) |

== See also ==
- Lists of U.S. state insignia
- List of U.S. state fossils

== Endnotes ==
1. In 1965, California became the first state to name an official state rock. A 2010 effort led by State Senator Gloria J. Romero, a Democrat from Los Angeles, sought to remove serpentine from its perch as the state's official stone. Organizations such as the Asbestos Disease Awareness Organization have supported the move as the olive green rock is a source of chrysotile, a form of asbestos that can cause mesothelioma and other forms of cancer. Geologists have rallied to oppose the bill, arguing that there is no way to be harmed from casual exposure to serpentine. The bill did not reach a final vote and died in committee at the end of August 2010. In 1986, California named benitoite as its state gemstone, a form of the mineral barium titanium silicate that is unique to the Golden State and only found in gem quality in San Benito County.
2. Colorado is the only state whose geological symbols reflect the national flag's colors: red (rhodochrosite), white (yule marble), and blue (aquamarine).
3. Florida's state gem, moonstone, was adopted to highlight Florida's role in the United States' Lunar program, which landed the first astronauts on the Moon.
4. Since 1983, Massachusetts has had three other official state rocks: State Historical Rock (Plymouth Rock), State Explorer Rock (Dighton Rock), and State Building and Monument Stone (Granite). In 2008, a State Glacial Rock (Rolling Rock) was designated as well.
5. A measure passed the Oregon Senate in March 1965 naming the thunderegg as Oregon's state rock, in a move that was supported as a way to stimulate tourism in the state. The thunderegg, a nodule-like geological structure, similar to a geode, that is formed within a rhyolitic lava flow, were said by the Native Americans of Warm Springs to have been created by thunder spirits that lived in the craters of Mount Hood and Mount Jefferson.
6. In 2009, West Virginia named bituminous coal as its official state rock, in a resolution that noted that the coal industry plays an "integral part of the economic and social fabric of the state". West Virginia joined Kentucky and Utah, which also recognize coal as a state mineral or rock. The drive to name coal as an official state symbol was initiated by a high school student from Wharncliffe, West Virginia, who initiated her project at a school fair and collected 2,500 signatures on a petition that was submitted to legislators.
