= Chlorastrolite =

Bluish-green sorosilicate, state gemstone of Michigan

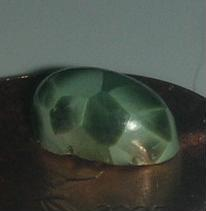
- Chlorastrolite (1972)

General
- Category: Minerals
- Formula: Ca_{2}MgAl_{2}(Si_{2}O_{7})(SiO_{4})(OH)_{2} · H_{2O}

Identification
- Color: Green, blueish

Chlorastrolite, also known as Isle Royale Greenstone, Green Starstone, and Turtle Back, is a green or bluish green stone. Chlorastrolite has finely radiating or stellate (for examples, see crystal habits) masses that have a "turtleback" pattern. The stellate masses tend to be chatoyant, meaning they have a varying luster. This chatoyancy can be subtranslucent to opaque. Cholorastrolite is a variety of pumpellyite: Ca_{2}(Mg,Fe)Al_{2}(SiO_{4})(Si_{2}O_{7})•(OH)_{2}H_{2}O. Chlorastrolite was once thought to be an impure variety of prehnite or thomsonite.

== Occurrences ==
Chlorastrolite occurs as amygdaloid structures and fracture fillings in basalt, and when the water and wave action has worn away the basalt, they are found as beach pebbles and granules in loose sediments. It is found in the Keweenaw Peninsula of the Upper Peninsula of Michigan and Isle Royale in Lake Superior. Isle Royale is a National Park, and so it is illegal to collect specimens there. It is difficult to identify an unpolished pebble of chlorastrolite. Most gem quality chlorastrolite stones are very small, and it is rare to find one that is larger than a half inch. The largest gem quality stone is in the Smithsonian Museum and measures 1.5 by 3 inches.

It was first described from Isle Royale, Lake Superior by C. T. Jackson and J. D. Whitney in 1847. Chlorastrolite, also known as greenstone, is the official state gem of Michigan.

== Other names ==
- Green starstone is most common in Michigan's Upper Peninsula.
- Greenstone or Isle Royale greenstone and Lake Superior greenstone.
- Turtle back is a name sometimes given because of the overall pattern, particularly in polished pieces, which roughly resembles that of a turtle shell.
- Uigite is a variety found on the island of Skye off the coast of Scotland.
- Zonochlorite is a misnomer sometimes given rounded masses of chlorastrolite within or weathered out of amygdaloidal cavities, especially those from the area around Nipigon Bay (on Lake Superior), Ontario, Canada. Confusion may derive from the fact that zonochlorite is sold as faux chlorastrolite.

== Sources ==
- R.V.Dietrich: Gemrocks - chlorastrolite
- Norman King Huber, 1979, The geologic story of Isle Royale National Park, USGS Bulletin 1309
- Mindat w/ locations
