= L. David Mech =

American biologist (born 1937)

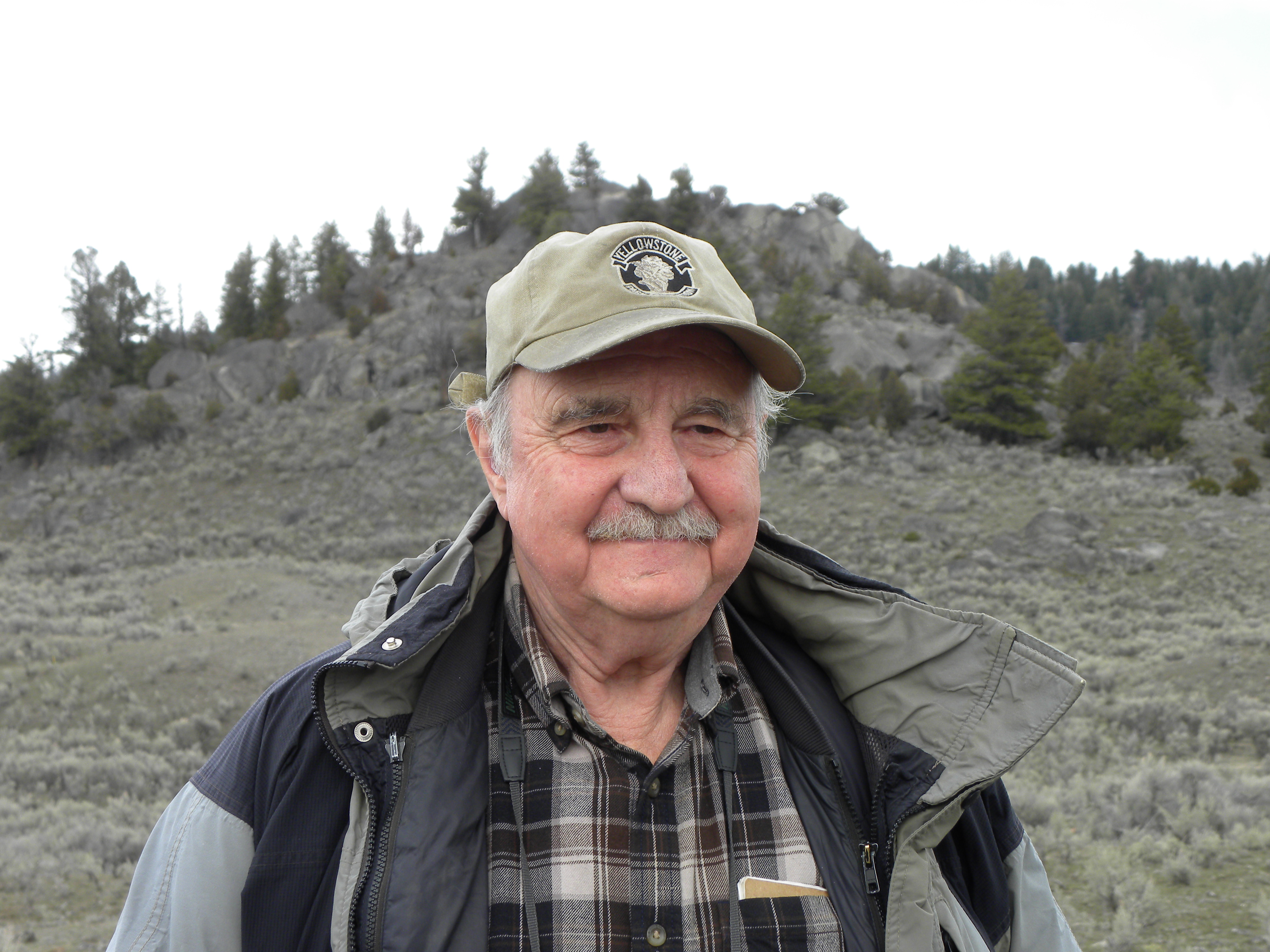
- Mech in 2017
- Born: January 18, 1937 (age 89); Auburn, New York, US
- Education: Cornell University, Purdue University
- Known for: Wolf ecology and behavior research
- Scientific career
- Fields: Biology, ecology
- Workplaces: University of Minnesota, U.S. Geological Survey
- Website: davemech.org

Lucyan David Mech (/miːtʃ/; born January 18, 1937), also known as Dave Mech, is an American biologist specializing in the study of wolves. He is a senior research scientist for the U.S. Geological Survey and an adjunct professor at the University of Minnesota. He has researched wolves since 1958 in locations including northern Minnesota, Isle Royale, Alaska, Yellowstone National Park, Ellesmere Island, and Italy.

Mech is the founder of the International Wolf Center and the vice-chair of its board of directors. The project to create the facility, which he started in 1985, was an outgrowth of his wolf research as well as his ambition to educate people about the nature of wolves, so that they may come to respect the creature through understanding.

He has published eleven books about wolves and other wildlife, including The Wolf: The Ecology and Behavior of an Endangered Species (1970) and Wolves: Behavior, Ecology, and Conservation, which he co-edited with Luigi Boitani (2003). His 1997 book The Arctic Wolf: Ten Years with the Pack received an honorable mention by the National Outdoor Book Award (Nature and the Environment category). His latest book, with Doug Smith and Dan MacNulty, is Wolves on the Hunt: the Behavior of Wolves Hunting Wild Prey.

== Early life and education ==
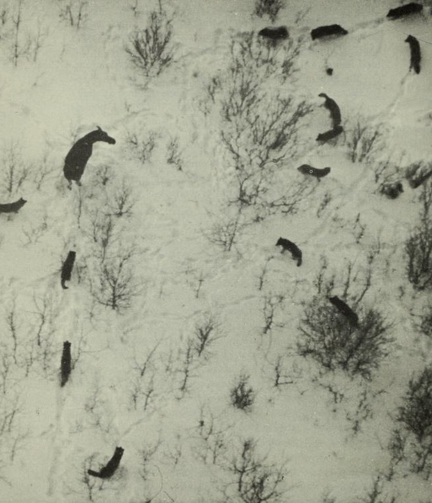
1966 photo by David Mech: Wolves holding moose at bay at Isle Royale

Mech was born in Auburn, New York, on January 18, 1937, and raised in Syracuse. He obtained a B.S. degree in conservation from Cornell University in 1958 and a Ph.D. in wildlife ecology from Purdue University in 1962.

From 1958 to 1962, Mech was a graduate student at Purdue, studying the wolves of Isle Royale, on Lake Superior, beginning in 1958. His first book was The Wolves of Isle Royale, published in 1966 by the Department of the Interior, having evolved from his doctoral thesis. In 1966, he studied wolves in the Superior National Forest in Minnesota.

== Career and research ==
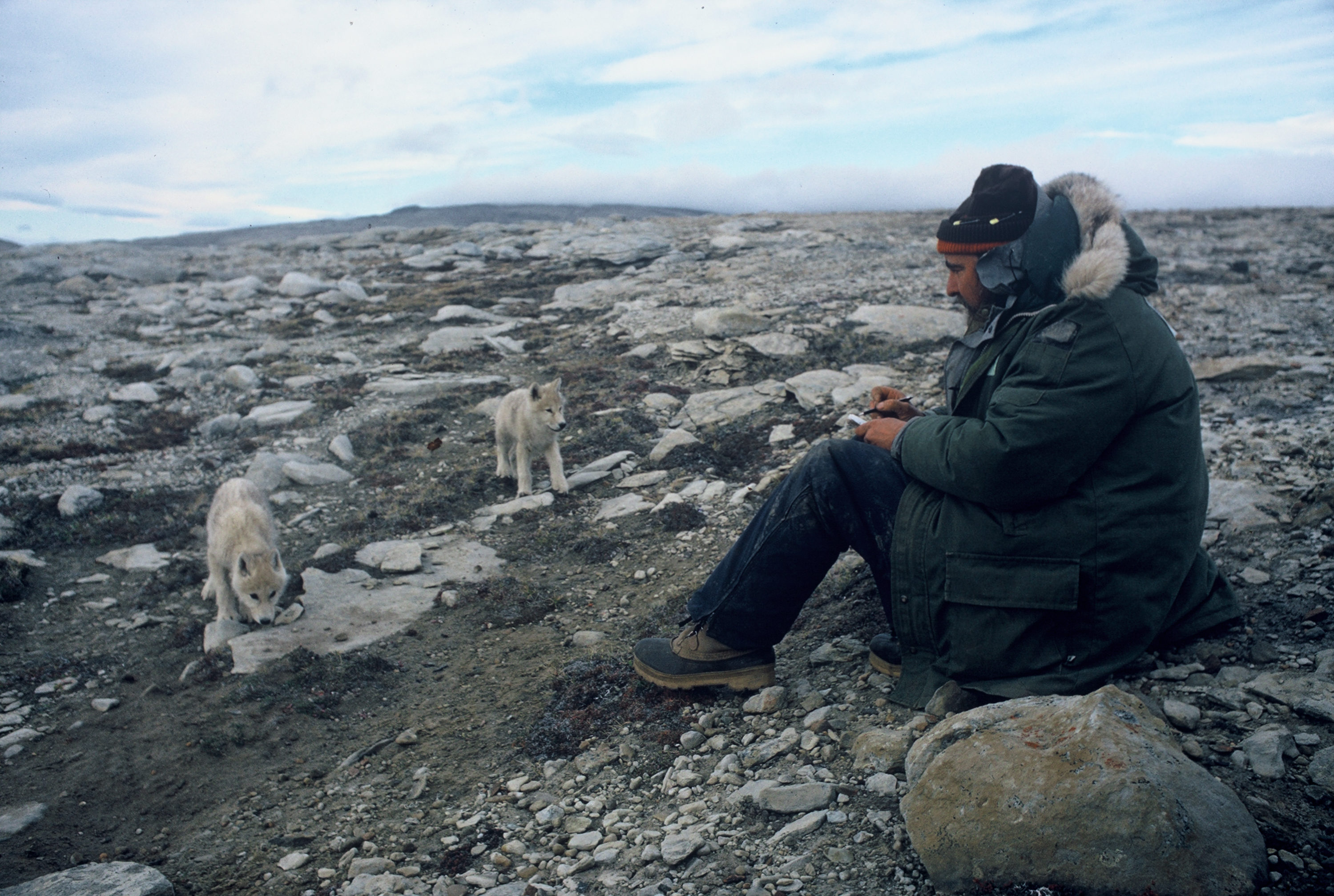
David Mech studying Arctic wolves

Beginning in 1986, Mech spent 25 summers observing wolves on Ellesmere Island. He said that his research on the wolves there was different, because it is one of the few places where they are not afraid of people, making that experience one of the best in his life. In addition, there were no trees or bushes to hide wolves from view in the tundra. In the summer, Mech found a den near the military and weather base at Eureka. He witnessed wolf interactions within a family unit and watched them hunting muskoxen; this type of research had not been done before. In an interview, Mech said, "The kind of stuff I got here was not just the objective behavioral stuff, but the kind of thing you get from living with a pet of some sort. You get an insight into the thing. You get to know the animal." Mech and photographer Jim Brandenburg together produced several articles and a film for National Geographic. The Ellesmere research concentrated on observing the interactions of pack members with each other and with pups around a den. The study also encompassed wolf interactions with muskoxen and arctic hares and wolf movements throughout the year using GPS collars.

Mech's research involves monitoring wolf–deer relations in the Superior National Forest of Minnesota, examining relations between the two populations as well as the effects of snow conditions and canine parvovirus on that system. He has also conducted research in Denali National Park, Alaska; Ellesmere Island, Nunavut, Canada; and in Yellowstone National Park. The Denali work involved studying the interactions between wolves and caribou, moose, and Dall sheep. The Yellowstone National Park studies concentrated primarily on wolf interactions with prey, including mortality and survival studies of elk.

Mech serves as a senior research scientist for the United States Geological Survey (USGS) since 1999, and prior to that, he was a wildlife research biologist in the Biological Resources Division of the USGS, from 1969 to 1999.

=== Positions ===
An avid mushroom hunter and fur trapper, Mech has continued to support fishing, hunting, and trapping, which has led to criticism from animal protectionists. He believes that states can manage wolves sustainably and that states where wolves are no longer on the endangered list should determine how the animal should be managed. On his website, he lists mink trapping as one of his interests. He closed the abstract to "Is science in danger of sanctifying the wolf?", published in the January 2012 issue of Biological Conservation, with "The wolf is neither a saint nor a sinner except to those who want to make it so."

Mech was actively involved in the reintroduction of gray wolves to areas from which they had disappeared through human activities. After more than 45 years of population recovery, in 2020, the US Fish and Wildlife Service removed the gray wolf from the list of endangered species. The Mexican and Red wolves remain on the list, however.

Mech has also written about wolf management through regulation. According to him, every year, a certain percentage of a wolf population must be killed by humans (in addition to natural mortality) to keep the population stable. According to his findings, about 50% of young wolves over 5–10 months old must be killed each year to bring a wolf population under control. In a 2017 publication, he describes, among other things, livestock-depredation control in the United States.

Mech has declined to express an opinion on whether wolves should be hunted or trapped for their pelts, saying that his opinion on the subject is no better than that of anybody else.

== Publications ==
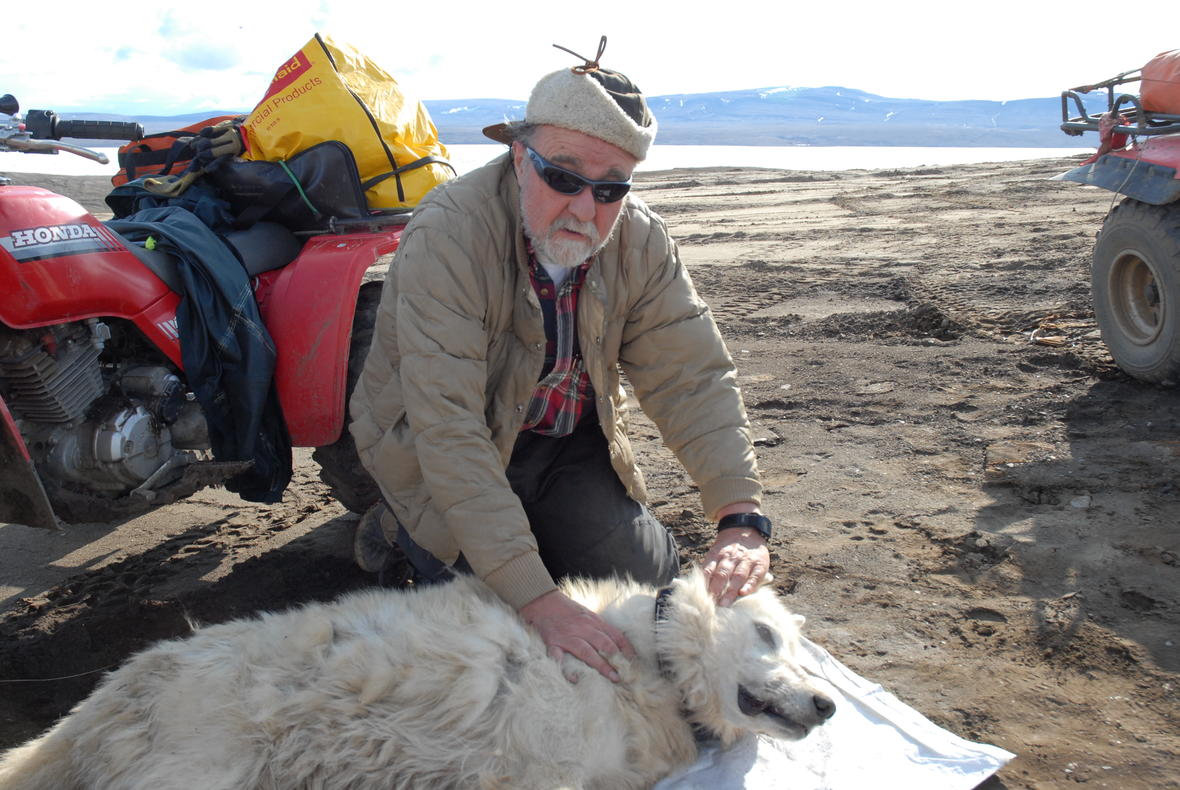
David Mech with a wolf tranquilized in order to fit a GPS tracking device

Mech has published approximately 380 scientific papers and 100 popular articles about wolves and other wildlife. He has written eleven books. These include The Wolf: The Ecology and Behavior of an Endangered Species (1970), Wolves: Behavior, Ecology, and Conservation, which he co-edited with Luigi Boitani (2003), and Wolves on the Hunt: The Behavior of Wolves Hunting Wild Prey (2015), with Doug Smith and Dan MacNulty. His 1997 book, The Arctic Wolf: Ten Years with the Pack, received an honorable mention by the National Outdoor Book Award (Nature and the Environment category). The International Wolf Center lists approximately 140 articles written by Mech, published from 1987 to the present, primarily in scientific journals.

== Awards ==
In 2005, Purdue University conferred upon Mech an additional honorary degree, with the statement: "Mech's long-term studies of the wolf and other wild vertebrates have resulted in nearly 400 scientific, semi-technical and popular publications or articles. His scholarly contributions have expanded the understanding of wolf ecology more than any other individual. No one has written about, spoken of or debated the status and future of the wolf more than him. He has contributed to virtually every wolf conservation effort that the planet has seen in recent decades. In recognition of his accomplishments, Mech was awarded the Wildlife Society's highest honor in 1993, the Aldo Leopold Award. Purdue previously honored him as recipient of the Distinguished Agricultural Alumni Award in 1995 and the Distinguished Undergraduate Research Award in 2000".
