= Patuxent River stone =

State gemstone of Maryland

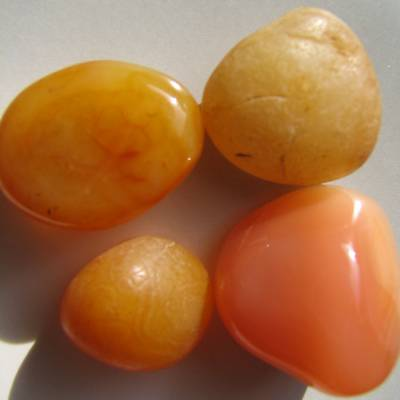
Tumbled specimens of Patuxent River Stone

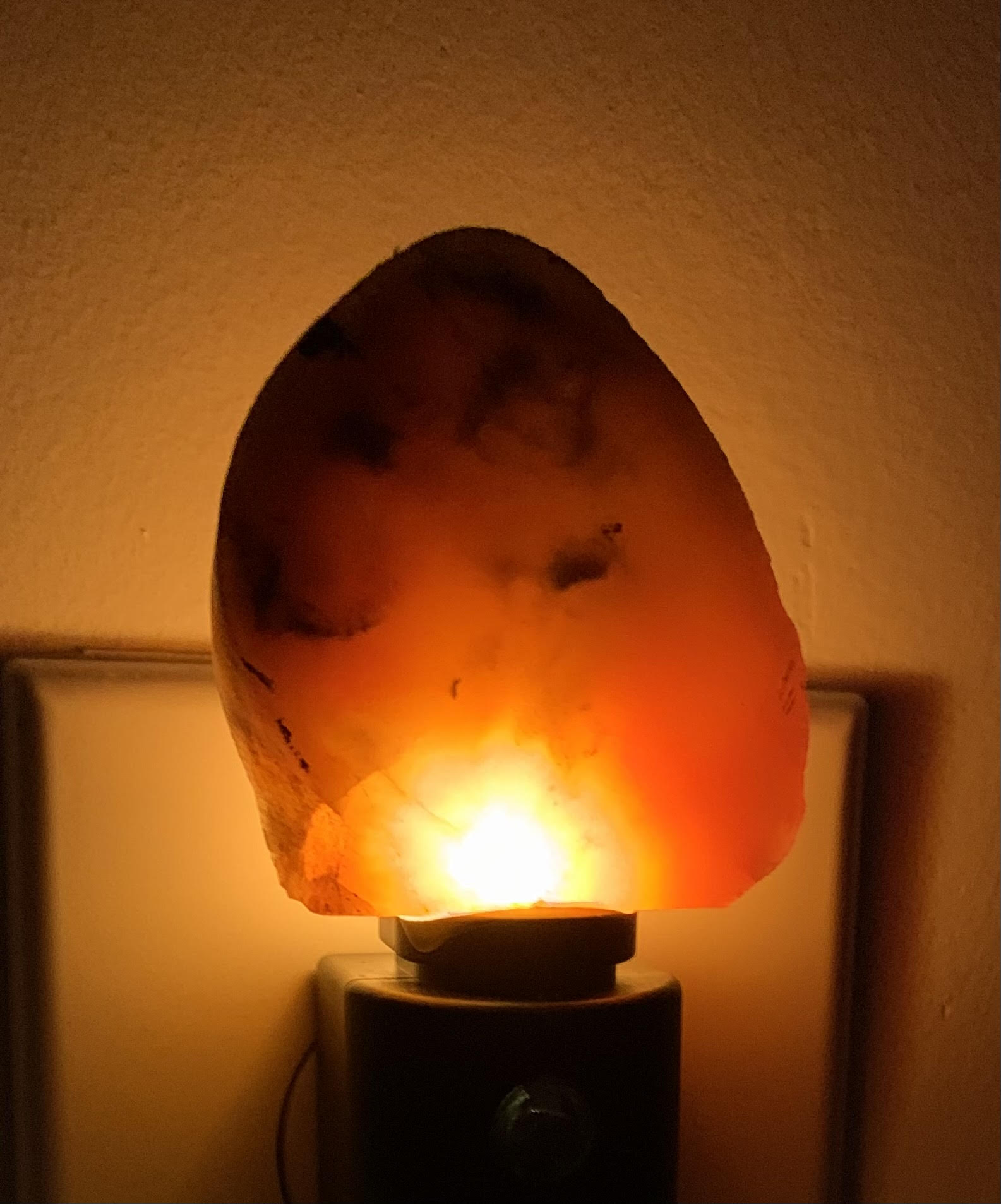
Patuxent River stone cut and Illuminated

The Patuxent River stone is the state gem of the U.S. state of Maryland. According to official state records, it is a form of agate; however, it is in fact an iron-stained quartzite. Patuxent River stone is found only in Maryland, and its yellow and red coloration is reminiscent of the state flag.

The Patuxent River stone became the state gem effective October 1, 2004, through the passage of Chapter 272, Acts of 2004; Code State Government Article, sec. 13-319.
