= Isle Royale =

Island in Lake Superior in Michigan, US

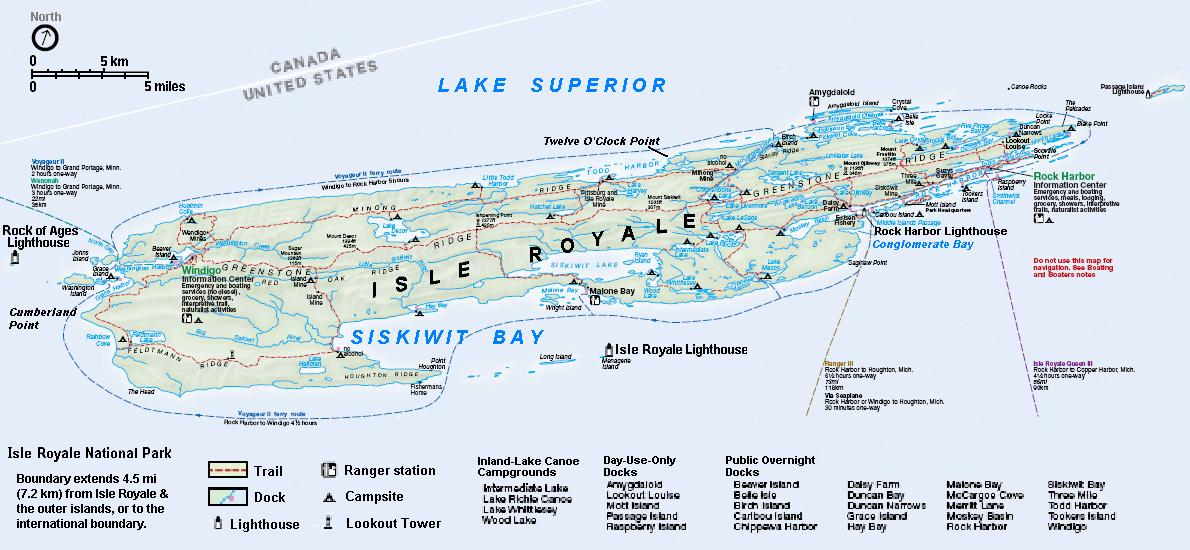
- Map of Isle Royale

- Location within Michigan

Geography
- Location: Lake Superior
- Coordinates: 48°0′N 88°55′W
- Area: 206.73 sq mi (535.4 km^{2})
- Length: 45 mi (72 km)
- Width: 9 mi (14 km)
- Highest elevation: 1,394 ft (424.9 m)
- Highest point: Mount Desor

Administration
- United States
- State: Michigan
- County: Keweenaw County
- Townships: Eagle Harbor / Houghton

Demographics
- Population: 0 (2000)

Isle Royale (/ˈrɔɪəl/, ROY-əl; French: Île Royale; Ojibwe: Minong) is an island of the Great Lakes located in the northwest of Lake Superior and part of the U.S. state of Michigan. The island, 450 smaller islands, and the surrounding waters make up Isle Royale National Park.

Isle Royale is 45 miles (72 km) long and 9 miles (14 km) wide, with an area of 206.73 square miles (535.4 km^{2}), making it the fifth-largest lake island in the world. In addition, it is the largest natural island in Lake Superior, the second-largest island in the Great Lakes (after Manitoulin Island), the third-largest in the contiguous United States (after Long Island and Padre Island), the largest in the contiguous U.S. with no road link to the mainland, and the 33rd-largest island in the United States.

Isle Royale is defined by the United States Census Bureau as Census Tract 9603 of Keweenaw County, Michigan. As of the 2000 census there was no permanent population on Isle Royale. After the island was made a national park, some existing residents were allowed to stay, and a few leases are still in effect.

== Geography ==
The highest point on the island is Mount Desor at 1,394 feet (425 m), or about 800 feet (240 m) above lake level. Isle Royale is within about 15 miles (24 km) from the shore of the Canadian province of Ontario (near the city of Thunder Bay) and 56 miles (90 km) the Keweenaw Peninsula, itself part of Upper Peninsula, on the Michigan shore. There are no roads on the island, and wheeled vehicles or devices, other than wheelchairs, are not permitted. Rock Harbor has wheeled carts available to move personal belongings from the Rock Harbor marina to the cabins and hotel. Also, the National Park Service employs tractors and utility terrain vehicles to move items around the developed areas at Windigo, Rock Harbor, and Mott Island.

Topsoil tends to be thin, which favors trees that have horizontal root patterns such as balsam fir, white spruce, and black spruce.

=== Interior lakes ===
Siskiwit Lake is the largest lake on the island. It has cold, clear water which is relatively low in nutrients. Siskiwit Lake contains several islands, including Ryan Island, the largest.

- Chicken Bone Lake
- Hatchet Lake
- Lake Desor
- Feldtmann Lake
- Intermediate Lake (Isle Royale)
- Lake Ritchie
- Sargent Lake

=== Climate ===
Source climate data for Isle Royale is lacking, particularly for the winter season, though general summaries of seasonal variations are available and data from nearby areas have been used to derive deductions for purposes of scientific study. For example, see the monthly temperature and precipitation table on the Isle Royale National Park page.

=== Geology ===
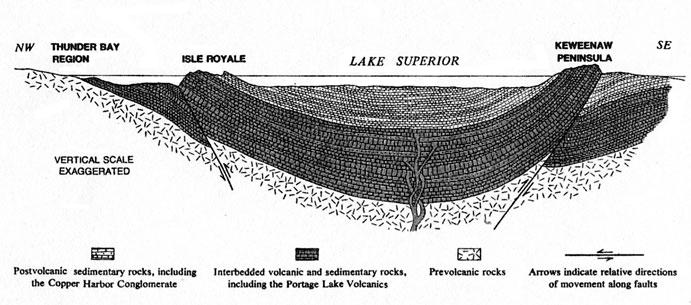
Cross-section of the Lake Superior basin showing the tilted strata of volcanic rock that form Isle Royale

The island is composed largely of ridges, running roughly southwest-to-northeast. The main ridge, Greenstone Ridge, is over 1,000 feet (300 m) in many places. Greenstone belts are exposed, with rounded stones of chlorastrolite, also known as greenstone, near and in the lake.

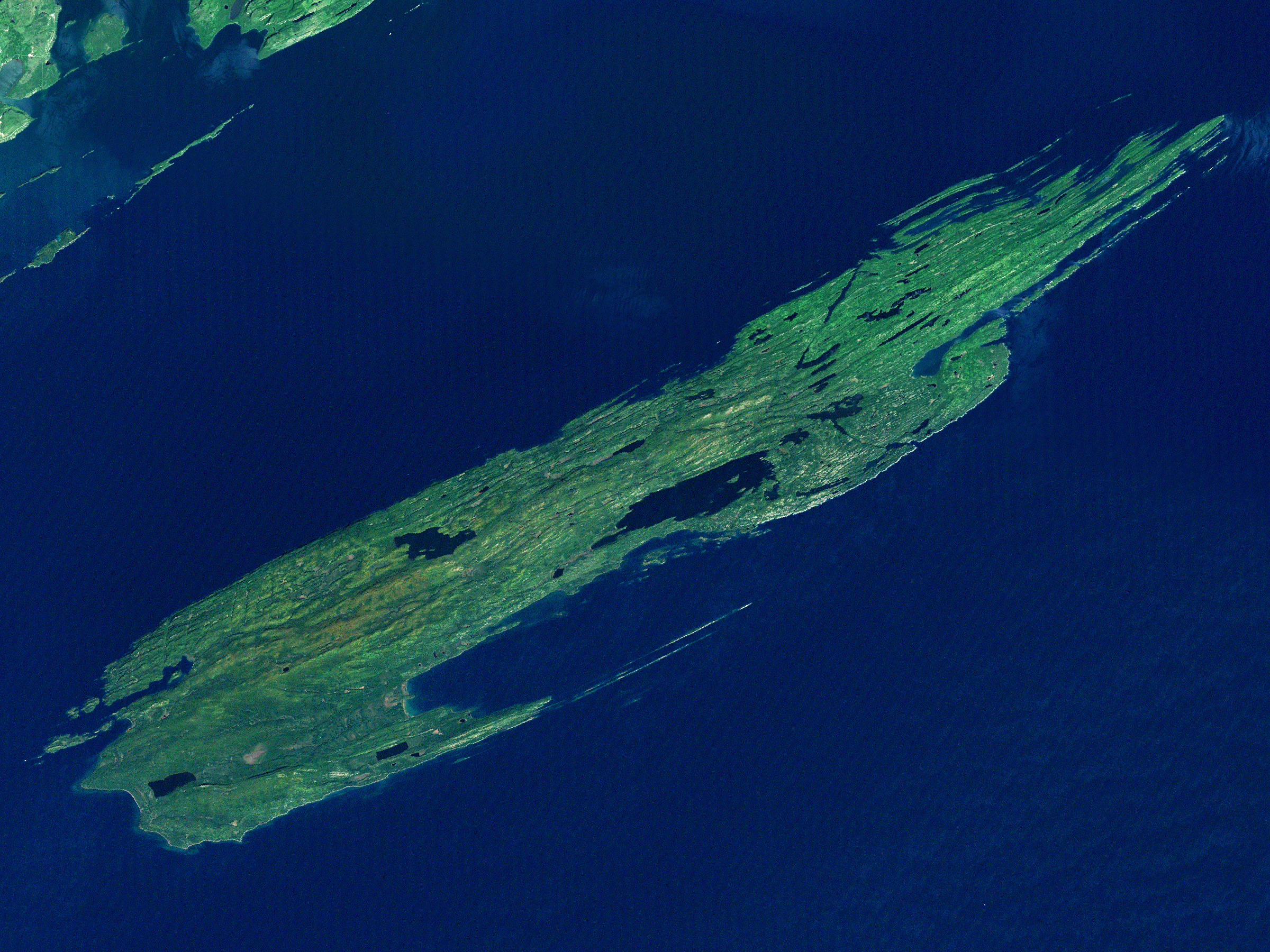
MODIS image of Isle Royale

According to the National Park Service, the north sides of the ridges tend to be steeper than the south sides. Coastal areas were once submerged beneath prehistoric lake waters, and contain many tumbled boulders and other large rocks.

=== Ecology ===
A number of habitats exist on the island, the primary being boreal forest, similar to neighboring Ontario and Minnesota. Upland areas along some of the ridges are effectively "balds" with exposed bedrock and a few scrubby trees, blueberry bushes, and hardy grasses. Occasional marshes exist, which are typically the by-product of beaver activities. There are also several lakes, often with wooded or marshy shores. The climate, especially in lowland areas, is heavily influenced by the cold waters of Lake Superior.

The island is well known among ecologists as the site of a long-term study of a predator–prey system, between moose and Great Lakes wolves. L. David Mech began this study in 1958 as a graduate student at Purdue University. There is a cyclical relationship between the two animals: as the moose increase in population, so do the wolves. Eventually, the wolves kill too many moose and begin to starve and lower their reproductive rates.

Historically neither moose nor wolves inhabited Isle Royale. Just prior to becoming a national park, the largest mammals on Isle Royale were Canadian lynx and the boreal woodland caribou. Archeological evidence indicates both of these species were present on Isle Royale for 3,500 years prior to being removed by direct human actions (hunting, trapping, mining, logging, fires and possibly the introduction of invasive species). The last boreal woodland caribou documented on Isle Royale was in 1925. Though Canadian lynx were removed by the 1930s some have periodically crossed the ice bridge from neighboring Ontario, Canada, the most recent being an individual sighting in 1980. Though lynx are no longer present on the island, their primary prey, snowshoe hares, remain. Before the appearance of wolves, coyotes were also a predator on the island. Coyotes appeared around 1905 and disappeared shortly after wolves arrived in the 1950s. Four wolves were brought from Minnesota in 2018, after some debate as to whether the introduction was an unnatural intervention.

Other common mammals are red foxes, beavers, and red squirrels. Some foxes are quite used to human contact, and can be seen prowling the campgrounds at dawn, looking for stray scraps left by unwary campers. For its part, the wolf is an elusive species which avoids human interaction. Few documented cases of direct wolf/human contact exist. Ermine have been periodically sighted around docks. Other mammals that can be seen include mink (along the various lake shores) and muskrats (occasionally at beaver ponds). Several species of bat also exist on the island. Reptiles include the eastern garter snake, painted turtle, and northern redbelly snake. Six species of frogs and three species of salamander also live on the island.

== History ==
The island was a common hunting ground for native people from nearby Minnesota and Ontario. A canoe voyage of thirteen miles is necessary to reach the island's west end from the mainland.

In prehistoric times, large quantities of copper were mined on Isle Royale and the nearby Keweenaw Peninsula. The region is scarred by ancient mine pits and trenches up to 70 feet (20 meters) deep. Carbon-14 testing of wood remains found in sockets of copper artifacts indicates that they are at least 6500 years old.

In Prehistoric Copper Mining in the Lake Superior Region, published in 1961, Drier and Du Temple estimated that over 750,000 tons of copper had been mined from the region. However, David Johnson and Susan Martin contend that their estimate was based on exaggerated and inaccurate assumptions. In 1670, a Jesuit missionary named Dablon published an account of "an island called Menong, celebrated for its copper." Menong, or Minong, was the native term for the island, and is the basis for the name of the Minong Ridge on the island.

Isle Royale was given to the United States by the 1783 treaty with Great Britain, but the British remained in control until after the War of 1812, and the Ojibwa peoples considered the island to be their territory. The Ojibwas ceded the island to the U.S. in the 1842 Treaty of La Pointe, with the Grand Portage Band unaware that neither they nor Isle Royale were in British territory. With the clarification to the Ojibwas of the 1842 Webster–Ashburton Treaty that was signed before the Treaty of La Pointe, the Ojibwas re-affirmed the 1842 Treaty of La Pointe in the 1844 Isle Royale Agreement, with the Grand Portage Band signing the agreement as an addendum to the 1842 treaty.

In the mid-1840s, a report by Douglass Houghton, Michigan's first state geologist, set off a copper boom in the state, and the first modern copper mines were opened on the island. Evidence of the earlier mining efforts was everywhere, in the form of many stone hammers, some copper artifacts, and places where copper had been partially worked out of the rock but left in place. The ancient pits and trenches led to the discovery of many of the copper deposits that were mined in the 19th century. The remoteness of the island, combined with the small veins of copper, caused most of the 19th-century mines to fail quickly. Between the miners and commercial loggers, much of the island was deforested during the late 19th century. In 1875, Isle Royale was set off from Keweenaw County, as a separate county, Isle Royale County. In 1897, the county was dissolved, and the island was reincorporated into Keweenaw County.

Isle Royale National Park was established on April 3rd, 1940, by Franklin D. Roosevelt. It was authorized by Congress on March 3, 1931. Once the island became a national park, logging and other exploitive activities ended, and the forest began to regenerate.

In 1980 a canine parvovirus epidemic swept though the island killing 36 of the 50 wolves living there. The severely inbred wolf population eventually fell to a single pair (who were simultaneously father-and-daughter and half-siblings) by early 2018.

The island was once the site of several lake trout and whitefish fisheries, as well as a few resorts. Today, it has no permanent inhabitants; the small communities of Scandinavian fishermen were removed by the United States National Park Service (NPS) after the island became a national park in 1940. About 12 families have lifetime leases for their cabins and claim Isle Royale as their heritage, and several descendant fishermen fish the Isle Royale waters commercially. The western tip of the island is home to several shipwrecks that are very popular with scuba divers, including the SS America. The NPS Submerged Resources Center mapped the 10 most famous of the shipwrecks in the park, and published Shipwrecks of Isle Royale National Park; The Archeological Survey, which gives an overview of the maritime history of the area.

=== Angelique Mott ===
In 1845, an Ojibwe woman named Angelique and her voyageur husband Charlie Mott were left on Isle Royale, as hires for Cyrus Mendenhall and the Lake Superior Copper Company. They were hired and carried to Isle Royale by Mendenhall's schooner, the Algonquin, first to scout for copper. Angelique found a large mass of copper ore, upon which she and her husband were hired to stay and guard until a barge could come to retrieve it, promised in no more than 3 months' time. They were dropped off in July and were left stranded there until the following Spring. They were left with minimal provisions, which consisted of a half-barrel of flour, six pounds of butter, and some beans. A supply boat was promised to arrive after the first few weeks, but it was never sent out.

Angelique and her husband were left to survive in the wilderness with limited supplies, on an island with scarce resources. They lost their canoe in a fall storm, and their fishing net was destroyed. By January 1846, Charlie went mad with hunger and even threatened to murder and eat Angelique. He returned to himself, loving and soft, but was weakening greatly, and eventually succumbed to his starvation, dying. Angelique was forced to leave the body in the cabin and created a brush shelter for herself to live in. She survived by eating poplar bark, bitter berries, and by pulling out her own hair, plaiting the strands, and creating snares with it, by which she caught rabbits on rare occasions. In the Spring of 1846, the Algonquin returned, and brought Angelique back to her mother. She died in 1874, in Sault Ste. Marie, Ontario.

The full events were chronicled in a footnote as told by Angelique in the first printing of a book called The Honorable Peter White by Ralph D. Williams in 1907; Angelique's story was pulled from the subsequent printing, thus making it the only written record that survives. Humans have not normally settled year-round on Isle Royale. For about three thousand years, Native Americans used the land for copper and fish. These Native Americans usually limited their visiting to the island in the summer. Americans in the nineteenth century did the same thing.

== Recreational activities ==
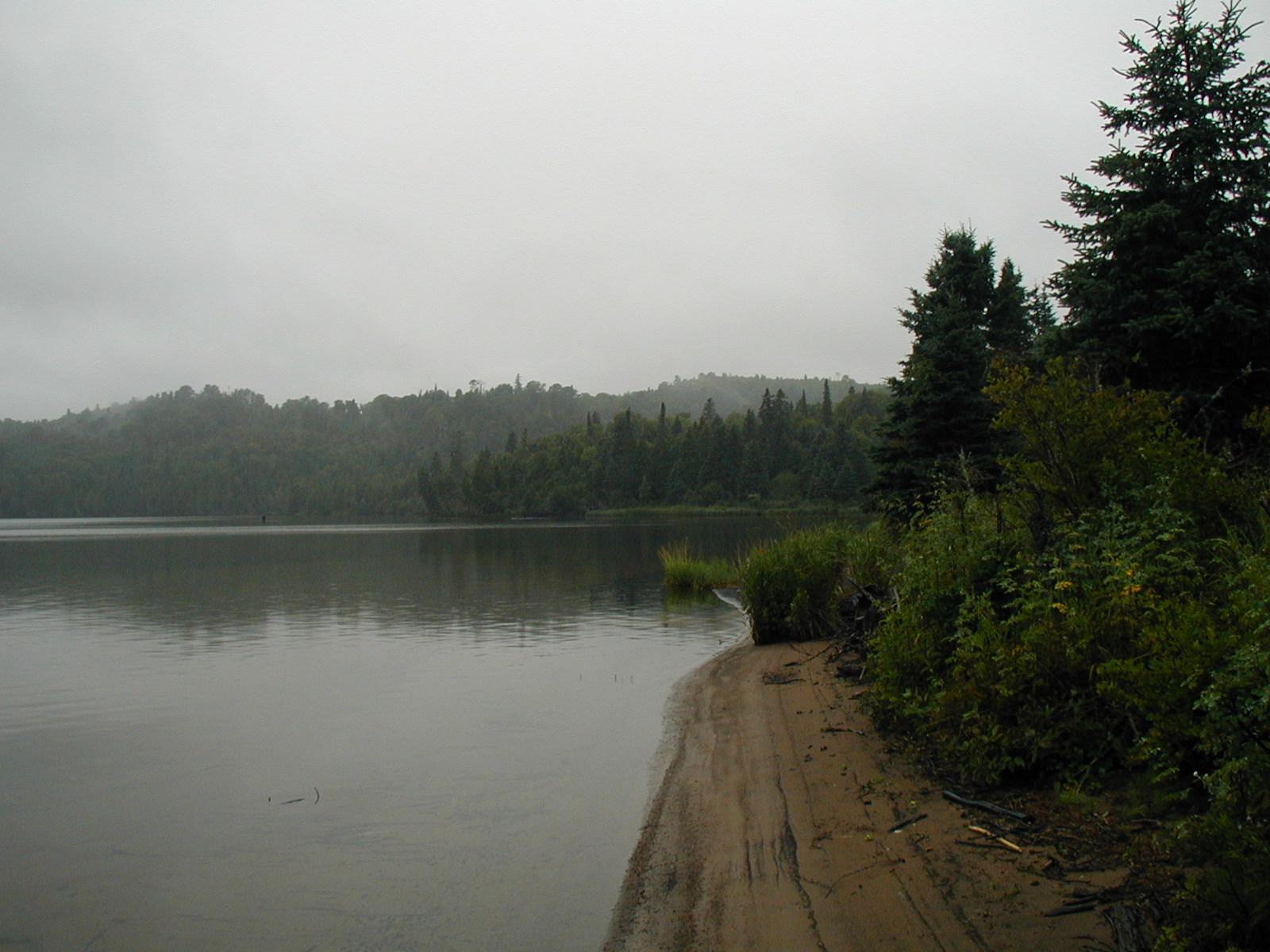
Beach near mouth of Washington Creek

The island and the 450 surrounding smaller islands and waters make up Isle Royale National Park. It is the least visited national park in the lower 48 states.

Recreational activity on Isle Royale includes hiking, backpacking, fishing, boating, canoeing, kayaking, and observing nature. Wheeled vehicles are not permitted on Isle Royale, such as bicycles or canoe portage devices; however, wheelchairs are allowed.

There are numerous campgrounds, many of which are only accessible by water. There are two small settlements on the island proper: Rock Harbor, which has a resort, a marina, and basic amenities, and Windigo, a smaller facility on the far western end of the island. Both Rock Harbor and Windigo have paid showers and provisions available.

A typical National Park Service campground consists of a few shelters (cabin-like structures with one wall of mosquito-proof screen), individual tent sites with picnic table, and group camping sites. There are one or more pit toilets at each facility. Campgrounds along the shore have a boat dock and overnight boaters are a common sight at some campgrounds. Waterfront locations also attract canoeists and kayakers. No wells are available, thus all water is usually filtered or thoroughly boiled to prevent infection by parasites and bacteria.

Beach at Huginnin Cove camp area

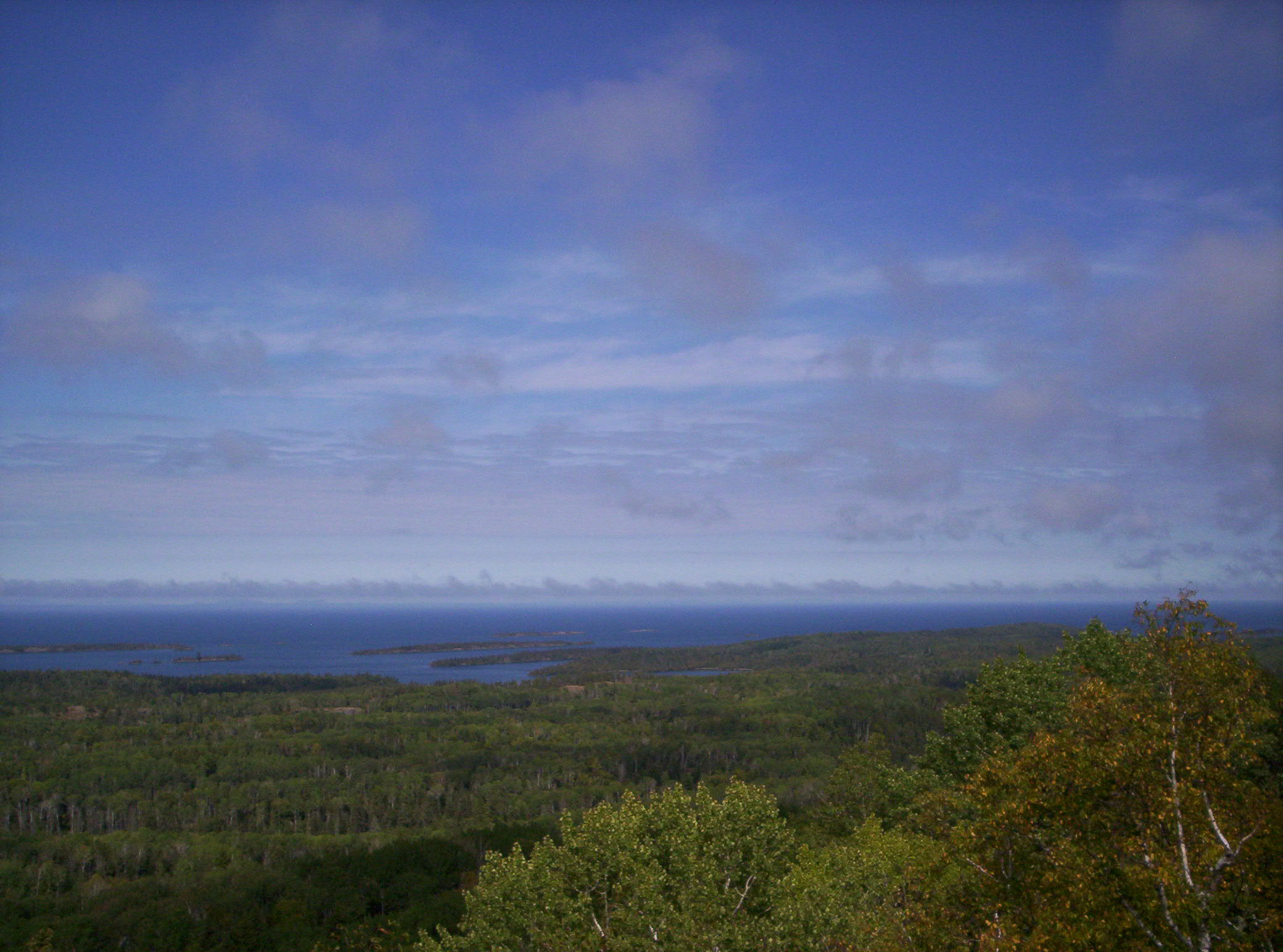
View from the top of Mount Franklin looking north

=== Hiking ===
The island offers approximately 170 miles (270 km) of hiking trails for everything from day hikes to a two-week circumnavigation hike. Some of the hiking trails are quite challenging, with steep grades. "The most popular, best marked and longest single route ...is the 40-mile Greenstone Ridge Trail that extends down the island's backbone." The trail leads to the peak of Mount Desor, at 1,394 feet (425 m), the highest point on the island, and passes through northwoods wilderness, and by inland glacial lakes, swamps, bogs and scenic shorelines. The most difficult trail is the Minong Ridge, which has a 13-mile hike from North Lake Desor to Windigo. It passes through quick elevation changes, high plants, and miles upon miles of hiking on ridges overlooking Lake Superior.

== Access ==
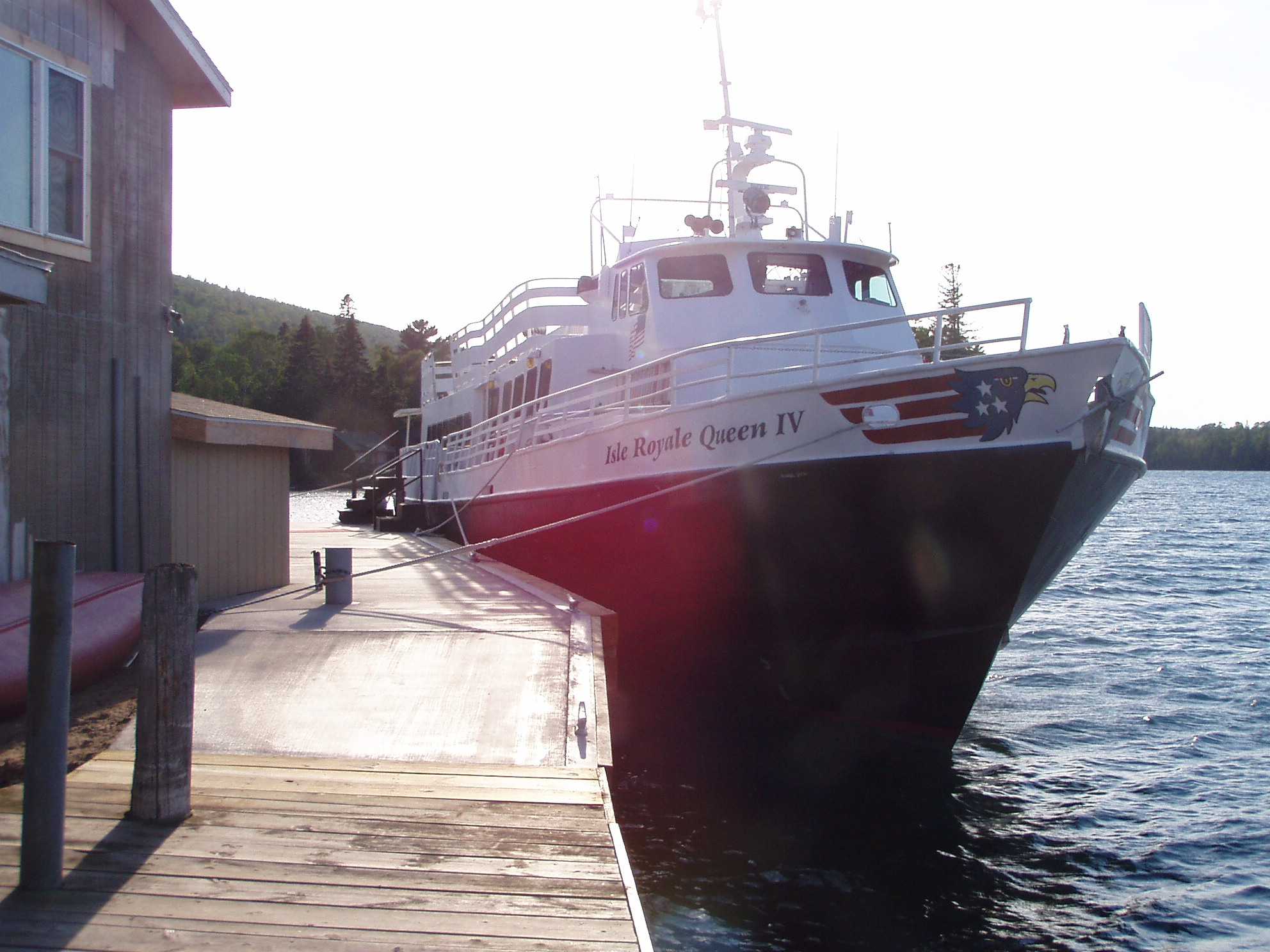
Isle Royale Queen IV at Copper Harbor

The island is accessible by private boat, seaplane, three private commercial ferries, and a National Park Service ferry.

Scheduled ferry service generally runs May through September:

- From Houghton, Michigan, the Ranger III, operated by the National Park Service, makes round trips to Rock Harbor two days a week.
- From Copper Harbor, Michigan, the Isle Royale Queen IV makes daily round trips to Rock Harbor.

=== Settlements and visitor services ===
- Rock Harbor
- Windigo
