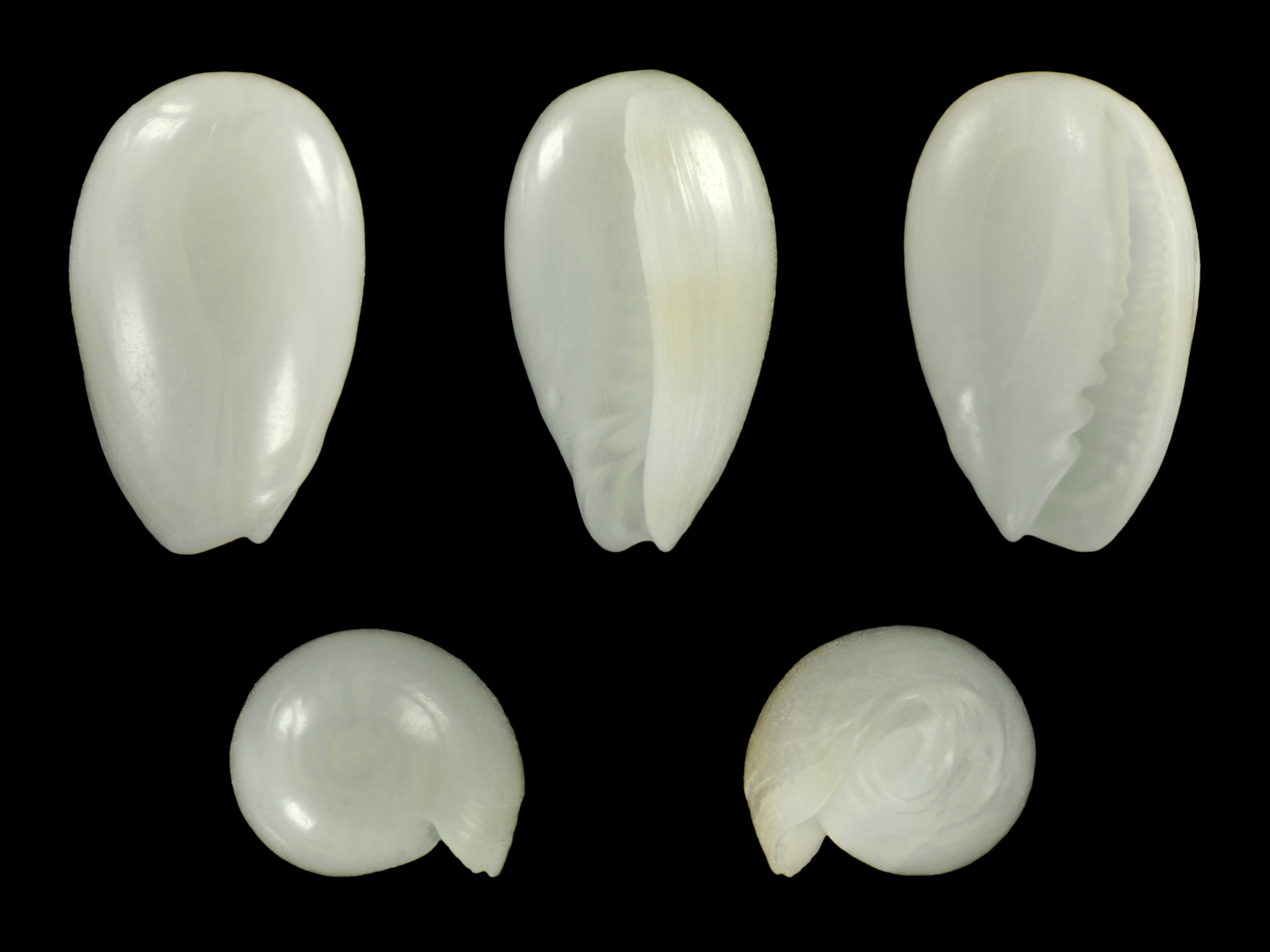
- Shell of Gibberula cherubini

Scientific classification
- Kingdom: Animalia
- Phylum: Mollusca
- Class: Gastropoda
- Subclass: Caenogastropoda
- Order: Neogastropoda
- Family: Cystiscidae
- Subfamily: Cystiscinae
- Genus: Gibberula
- Species: G. cherubini

Binomial name
- Gibberula cherubini (Bavay, 1922)

Synonyms
- Marginella cherubini Bavay, 1922

= Gibberula cherubini =

Species of gastropod

Gibberula cherubini is a species of sea snail, a marine gastropod mollusk in the family Marginellidae, the margin snails.

== Description ==
The length of the shell attains 3.6 mm.

== Distribution ==
This species occurs in the Indian Ocean off Madagascar, the Seychelles, and Réunion.
