= Gibberula pallata =

Scientific classification
- Kingdom: Animalia
- Phylum: Mollusca
- Class: Gastropoda
- Subclass: Caenogastropoda
- Order: Neogastropoda
- Family: Cystiscidae
- Subfamily: Cystiscinae
- Genus: Gibberula
- Species: G. pallata

Binomial name
- Gibberula pallata Bavay, 1913

Synonyms
- Marginella pallata Bavay, 1913

Species of gastropod

Gibberula pallata is a species of very small sea snail, a marine gastropod mollusk or micromollusk in the family Cystiscidae.
