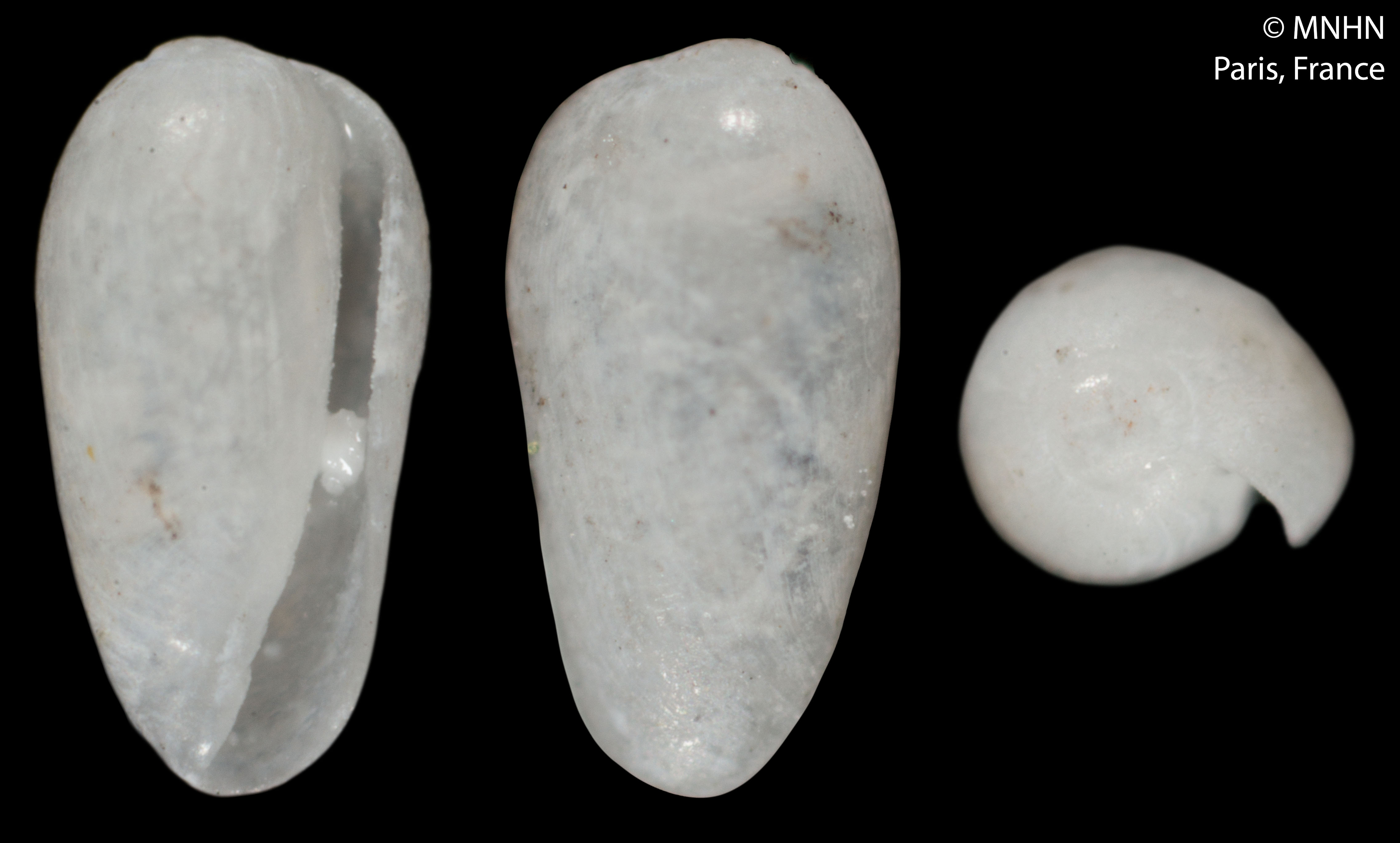
- Shell of Volvarina micros (syntype at MNHN, Paris)

Scientific classification
- Kingdom: Animalia
- Phylum: Mollusca
- Class: Gastropoda
- Subclass: Caenogastropoda
- Order: Neogastropoda
- Family: Marginellidae
- Subfamily: Marginellinae
- Genus: Volvarina
- Species: V. micros

Binomial name
- Volvarina micros (Bavay, 1922)

Synonyms
- Marginella (Volvaria) micros Bavay, 1922 (basionym)

= Volvarina micros =

Species of gastropod

Volvarina micros is a species of sea snail, a marine gastropod mollusk in the family Marginellidae, the margin snails.

== Description ==
The length of the shell attains 1.4 mm, its diameter 0.8 mm.

(Original description in Latin) The shell is exceedingly small, thin, and translucent, featuring an obtuse spire. The body whorl effectively forms the entire shell; it is inflated toward the bottom and becomes contracted at the base. The aperture is dilated inferiorly, while the left margin is triplicated below with weak, nearly straight folds that are barely conspicuous. The right lip is smooth and is slightly flexed inward.

== Distribution ==
This marine species occurs off the Tuamotu Islands, French Polynesia; also in the Red Sea.
