= Gibberula quadrifasciata =

Scientific classification
- Kingdom: Animalia
- Phylum: Mollusca
- Class: Gastropoda
- Subclass: Caenogastropoda
- Order: Neogastropoda
- Family: Cystiscidae
- Subfamily: Cystiscinae
- Genus: Gibberula
- Species: G. quadrifasciata

Binomial name
- Gibberula quadrifasciata (Marrat, 1873)

Synonyms
- Marginella miliaris var. jullieni Bavay, 1917; Marginella nana Marrat, 1877; Marginella quadrifasciata Marrat, 1873

Species of gastropod

Gibberula quadrifasciata is a species of sea snail, a marine gastropod mollusk, in the family Cystiscidae.
