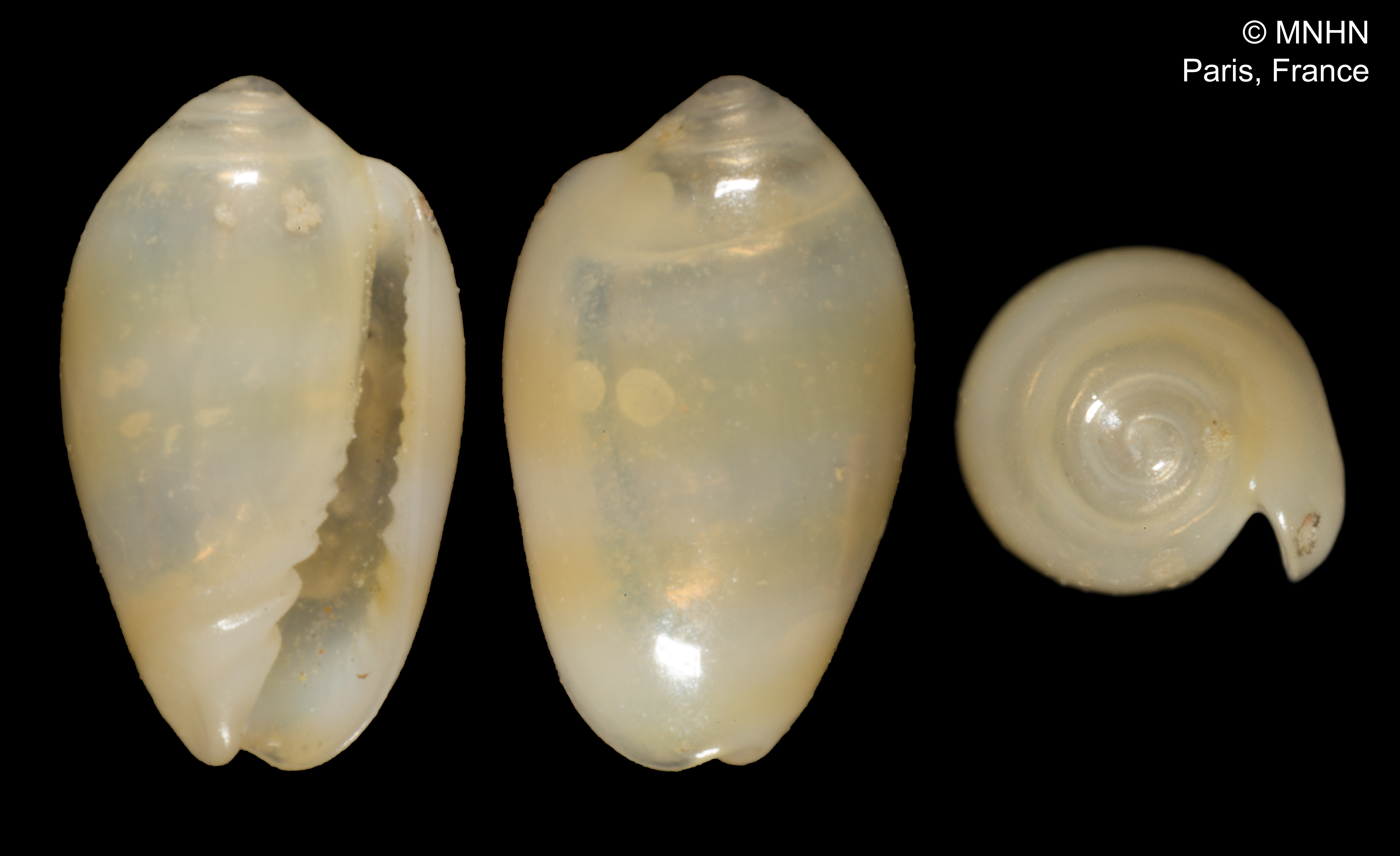
- Shell of Gibberula aurata (specimen at MNHN, Paris)

Scientific classification
- Kingdom: Animalia
- Phylum: Mollusca
- Class: Gastropoda
- Subclass: Caenogastropoda
- Order: Neogastropoda
- Family: Cystiscidae
- Subfamily: Cystiscinae
- Genus: Gibberula
- Species: G. aurata

Binomial name
- Gibberula aurata Bavay, 1913

Synonyms
- Marginella aurata Bavay in Dautzenberg, 1912 (original combination) &display_parents= 3

= Gibberula aurata =

Species of gastropod

Gibberula aurata is a species of sea snail, a marine gastropod mollusk, in the family Cystiscidae.
