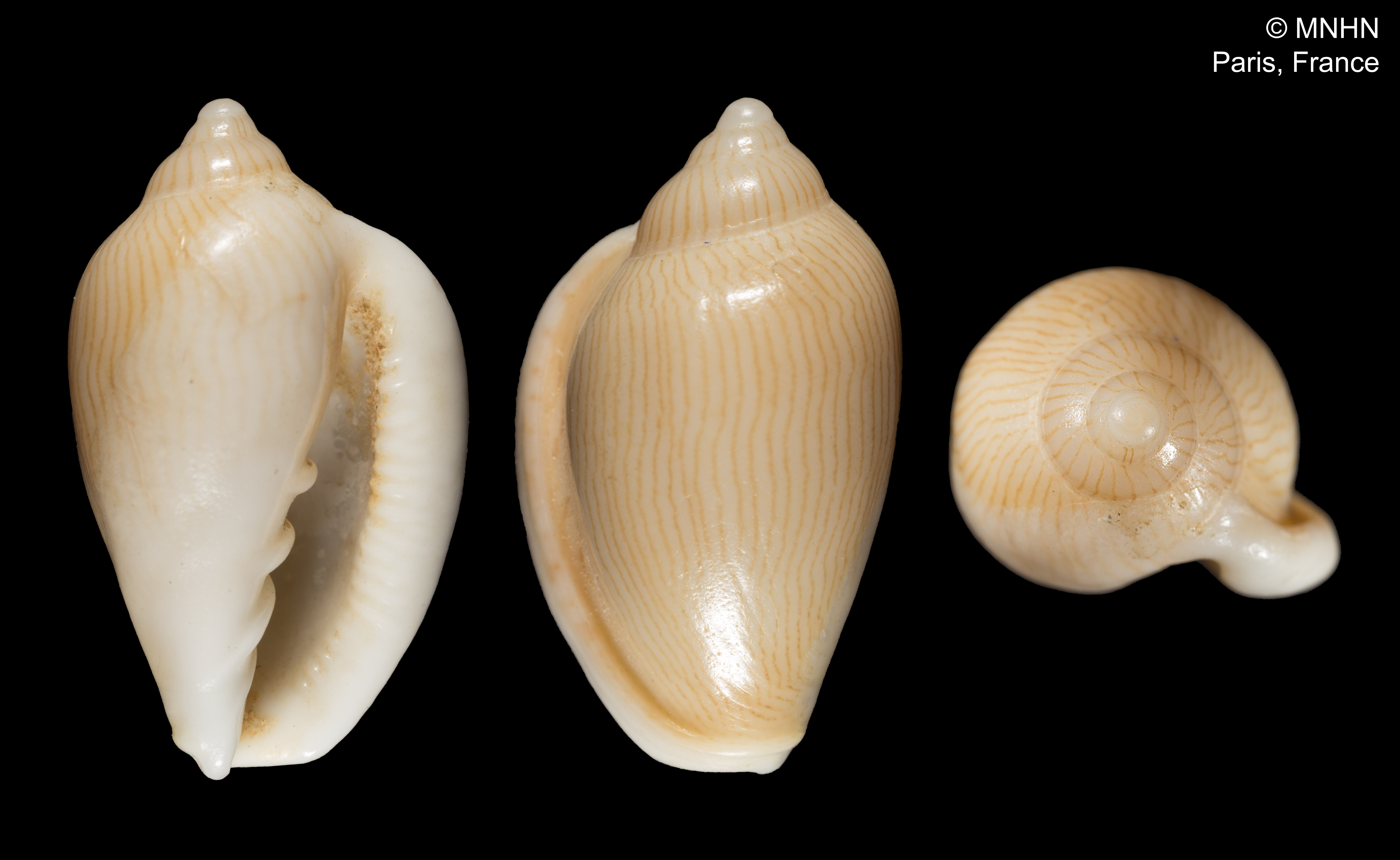
- Shell of Marginella amazona (holotype at MNHN, Paris)

Scientific classification
- Kingdom: Animalia
- Phylum: Mollusca
- Class: Gastropoda
- Subclass: Caenogastropoda
- Order: Neogastropoda
- Family: Marginellidae
- Subfamily: Marginellinae
- Genus: Marginella
- Species: M. amazona

Binomial name
- Marginella amazona Bavay, 1912

Synonyms
- Marginella (Ovulamarginella) amazona Bavay, 1912· accepted, alternate representation

= Marginella amazona =

Species of gastropod

Marginella amazona is a species of sea snail, a marine gastropod mollusk in the family Marginellidae, the margin snails.

== Distribution ==
This species occurs in the Atlantic Ocean off Benin.
