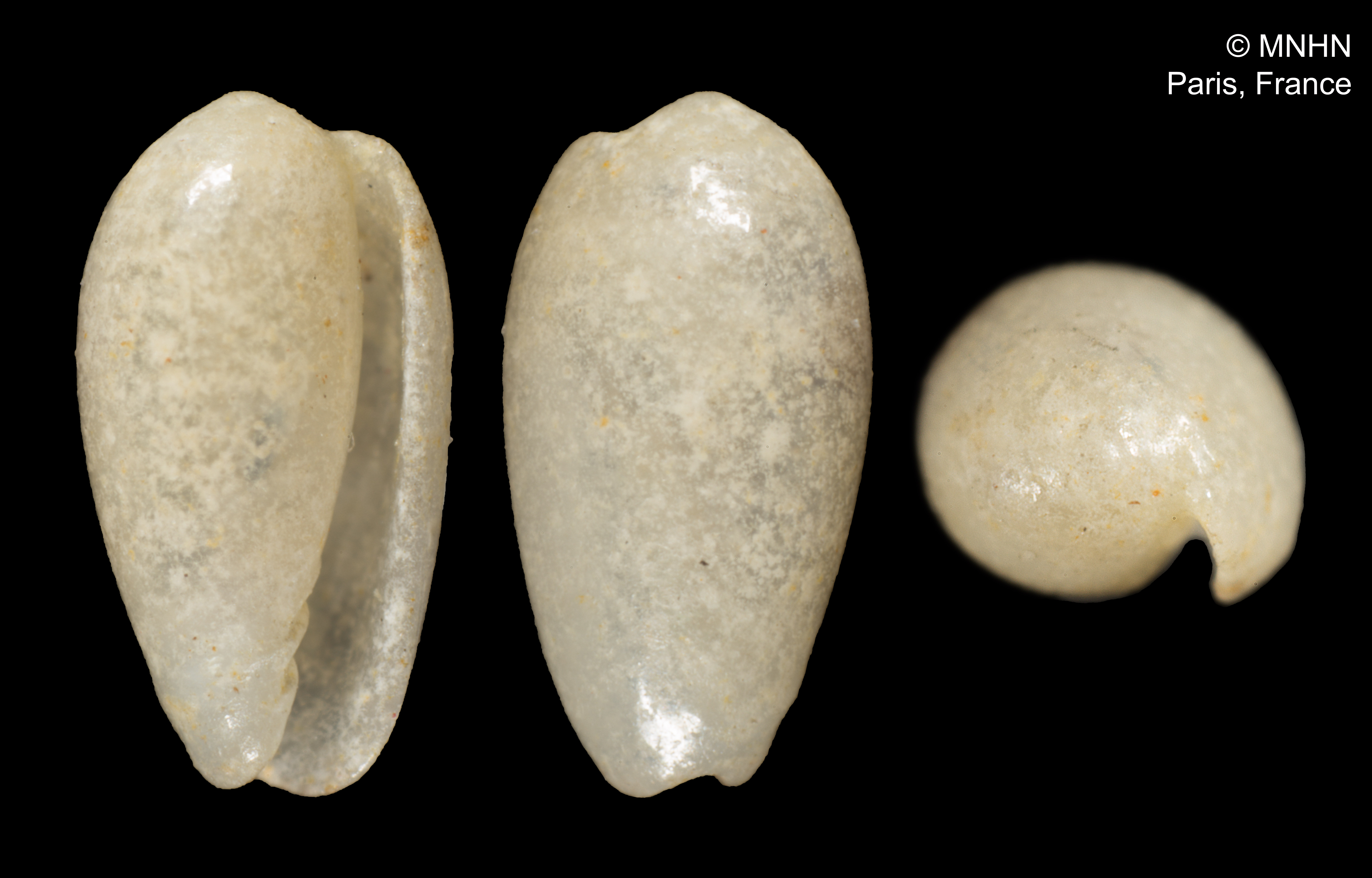
- Shell of Gibberula columnella (syntype at MNHN, Paris)

Scientific classification
- Kingdom: Animalia
- Phylum: Mollusca
- Class: Gastropoda
- Subclass: Caenogastropoda
- Order: Neogastropoda
- Family: Cystiscidae
- Subfamily: Cystiscinae
- Genus: Gibberula
- Species: G. columnella

Binomial name
- Gibberula columnella Bavay in Dautzenberg, 1912

Synonyms
- Marginella columnella Bavay in Dautzenberg, 1912 (original combination)

= Gibberula columnella =

Species of gastropod

Gibberula columnella is a species of very small sea snail, a marine gastropod mollusk or micromollusk in the family Cystiscidae.

== Distribution ==
This species occurs in the Southern Atlantic off Angola.
