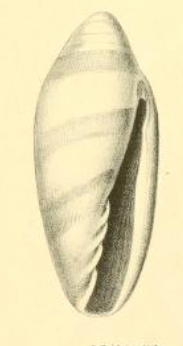
- Shell of Volvarina hirasei (holotype)

Scientific classification
- Kingdom: Animalia
- Phylum: Mollusca
- Class: Gastropoda
- Subclass: Caenogastropoda
- Order: Neogastropoda
- Family: Marginellidae
- Subfamily: Marginellinae
- Genus: Volvarina
- Species: V. hirasei

Binomial name
- Volvarina hirasei (Bavay, 1917)

Synonyms
- Marginella hirasei Bavay, 1917 (original combination)

= Volvarina hirasei =

Species of gastropod

Volvarina hirasei is a species of sea snail, a marine gastropod mollusk in the family Marginellidae, the margin snails.

== Description ==
The length of the shell attains 6.1 mm.

(Original description in French) The shell is of mediocre size, quite solid and fusiform. The spire is exserted but not very high and a slightly obtuse. The shell contains 4½ whorls, the last of which forms 5/6 of the total height of the shell. This body whorl is swollen and rises slightly at its end towards the suture. The long aperture is triangular, terminating superiorly in a small sinus. The outer lip is arched exteriorly and recedes upwards to form the sinus. It is noticeably thickened, especially in its basal part and shows in its middle a rather noticeable impression. The inner lip bears on its oblique columellar part four plaits. These are well marked and occupy the lower half of the inner lip. The background color is a very pale blond with three tawny bands on the body whorl. The first of these bands is quite wide, placed under the suture, but not touching it, the second is less wide and occupies the middle of the whorl and the third is widest, starting at the middle of the aperture. It occupies the base of the last whorl.

== Distribution ==
This marine species occurs off the Philippines, Japan and New Guinea.
