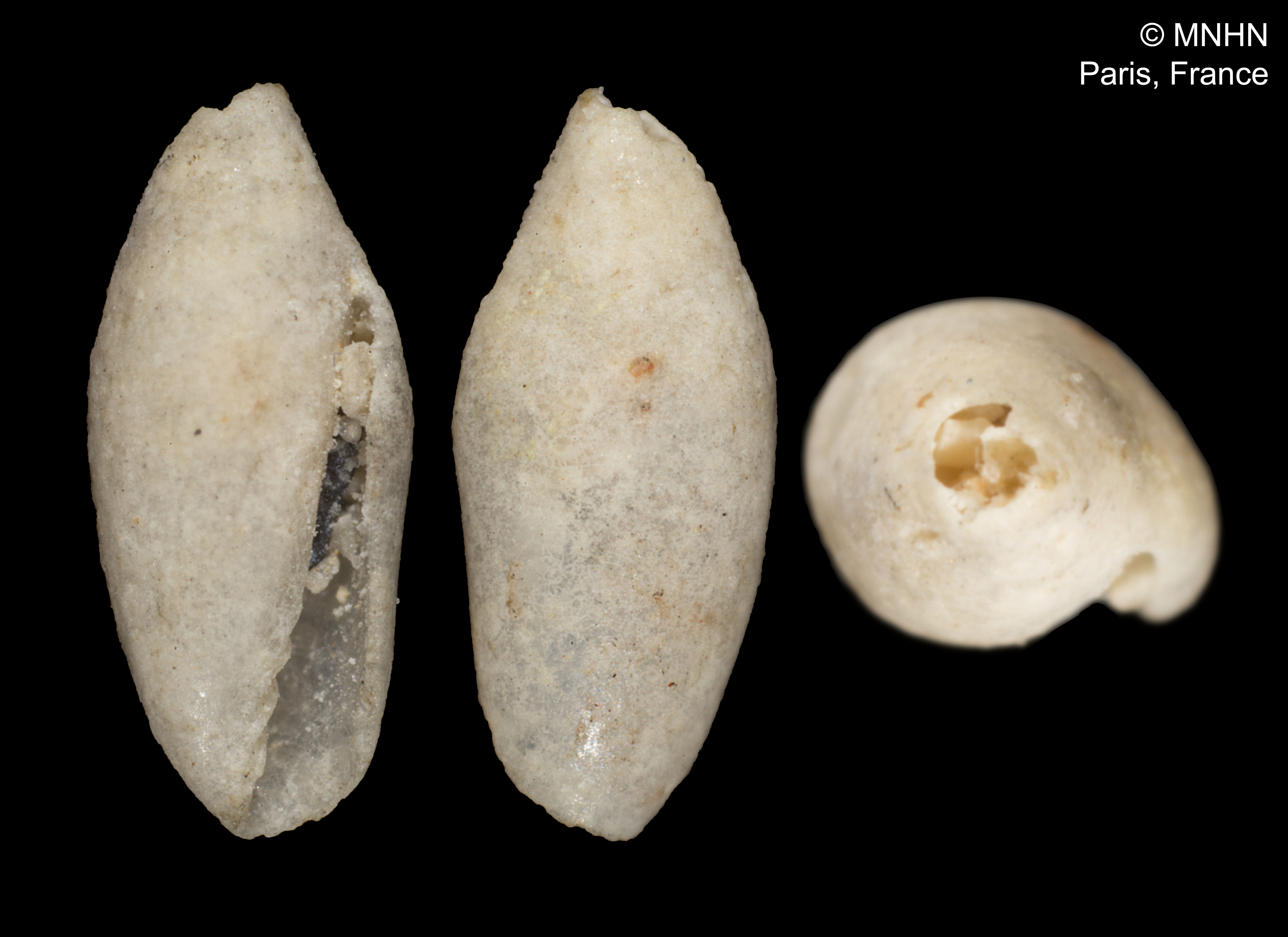
- Shell of Volvarina pupa (lectotype at MNHN, Paris)

Scientific classification
- Kingdom: Animalia
- Phylum: Mollusca
- Class: Gastropoda
- Subclass: Caenogastropoda
- Order: Neogastropoda
- Family: Marginellidae
- Subfamily: Marginellinae
- Genus: Volvarina
- Species: V. pupa

Binomial name
- Volvarina pupa (Bavay, 1922)

Synonyms
- Marginella pupa Bavay, 1922 (basionym)

= Volvarina pupa =

Species of gastropod

Volvarina pupa is a species of sea snail, a marine gastropod mollusk in the family Marginellidae, the margin snails.

== Description ==
The length of the shell attains 3.6 mm, its diameter 1.4 mm.

(Original description in French) The small and fragile shell has an ovoid shape. It is very elongated. The color is dirty white. The whorls are obtuse and conoidal. The body whorl is large and almost cylindrical. The vertical aperture is quite wide. It is dilated towards the base and has four approximately equal columellar folds occupying the lower third of the inner lip. The outer lip is simple and a little thickened in its middle part.

== Distribution ==
This marine species occurs in the Atlantic Ocean off Brazil.
