= Nickel mining in New Caledonia =

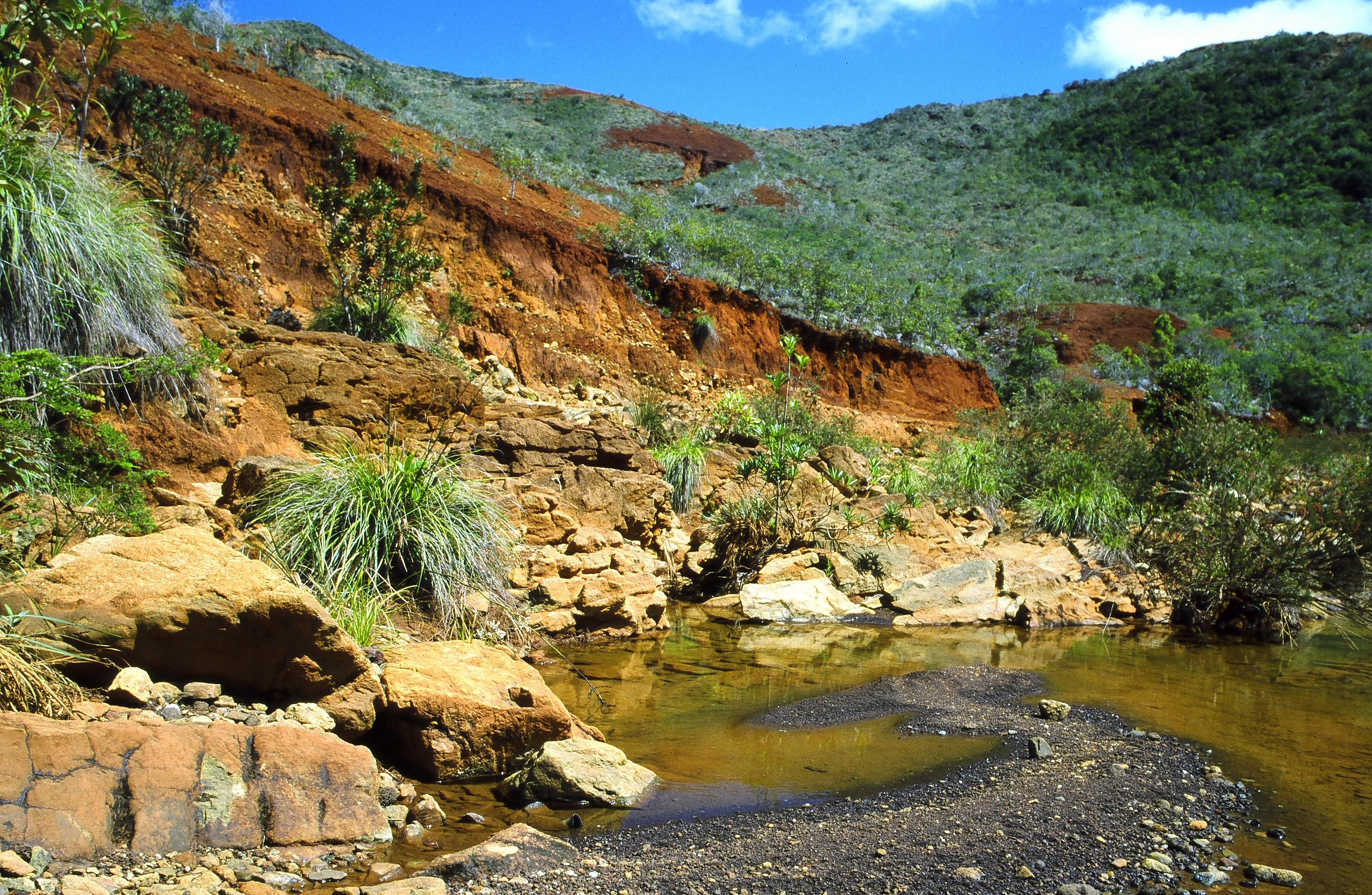
- A creek in southern New Caledonia. Red colours reveal the richness of the ground in nickel and iron oxides
- Location: New Caledonia, Overseas territory of France
- Products: Ferronickel, nickel matte
- Production: 200,000 tonnes
- Financial year: 2020
- Opened: 1864

Nickel mining in New Caledonia is a major sector of the New Caledonian economy. The island contains about 7.1 million tonnes of nickel reserves, about 10% of the world's total. With an annual production of 200,000 tonnes in 2020, New Caledonia was the world's fourth largest producer after Indonesia (760,000), Philippines (320,000), and Russia (280,000), followed by Australia (170,000) and Canada (150,000).

Nickel production in New Caledonia accounts for 6% of the island's GDP and 24% of private employment. With the exclusion of tourism, nickel ore and derived metallurgical products represent about 90% of the total value of exports. The industry has played a dominant role in the politics of New Caledonia for over a century.

== History ==
Nickel was found in New Caledonia in 1864 by engineer Jules Garnier. It is distributed in lateritic layers that cover about one third of the area of the main island of New Caledonia. The nickel concentration is inhomogeneous and also varies with the depth. Whereas its usual concentration is 2–5 percent, it can reach 10–15 percent in scattered deposits of green garnierite. Those areas were developed first, using primitive manual extraction methods and were gradually depleted, resulting in the present average concentration of about 2.6 percent. This nickel is located at a depth of about 30 metres (98 ft). Shallower layers of 10–20 metres (33–66 ft) also contain nickel, but at half the concentration. They remain unexploited and constitute most of the nickel reserves of New Caledonia.

Wide-scale mining started in 1875 in Houaïlou and Canala communes. Early mining was done by hand and then gradually became mechanised. By beginning of the 20th century two large mines at Bourai and Thio were established. In the initial years, after nickel was discovered mining was done in about 330 mines. However, in 1981 there were only 30 functional mines as against 130 in the early 1970s. Because of the remote location of the islands, about half of the ore was smelted locally, despite the underdeveloped industrial infrastructure of New Caledonia. Another half was exported, mainly to Japan. The first nickel smelter was built in 1879 with two other added in 1910 and 1913. The smelted product contained about 70–80% nickel and was sent for refining to France. Because of low nickel content in the ore, local smelting resulted in vast amount of displaced rocks near the smelters that changed the local landscape.

In the 1930s, the Europeans (also called Caldoche) and companies like the Société le Nickel dominated the economies of the colony. The native Melanesians were confined to reservations which made up only 10 per cent of New Caledonia's land area. The main source of mine labor came from Asian migrants recruited by France. The arrival of these migrants from India, Japan, China, Java, and Vietnam both increased and changed the demographics of New Caledonia's population. By the 1920s, Asians outnumbered the French.

The nickel mining industry made New Caledonia strategically significant during World War II, with nickel a key component of weaponry. Its importance contributed to Australia's decision to support the 1940 New Caledonia coup d'état, which saw a Free French administration established on the islands and allowed for Allied control of nickel reserves.

The production of ore was nearly constant between 1875 and 1948, but then increased about 70 times reaching a peak of about 8 million tonnes in 1971, at which time New Caledonia was the second largest nickel producer in the world. In the second half of the 1960s, the nickel industry experienced rapidly increasing demand linked to the Vietnam War. New Caledonia's exports had quadrupled over the past decade. This rise followed by a decline, to about 4 million tonnes of ore in 1981, due to cyclones, reducing demand for the metal and increasing role of other world producers, such as Indonesia, Philippines and Australia. Correspondingly, the mined area decreased from 21,500 to 8,700 hectares (53,000 to 21,000 acres) and the number of people employed in the industry from about 6,200 to about 3,600. Nearly half of them worked at the mines and another half at the major Doniambo processing plant near Noumea.

== Mines ==
Strip mining is the most common technique adopted for nickel mining and statistics show that stripping of 500 million tonnes of overburden had to be removed to extract nickel ore, which amounted to clearing an area of 20 hectares (49 acres) per million tonne (five million tonnes of ore per year generate 25 million tonnes of tailings).

The local nickel industry is dominated by the French company Eramet which has a 60% interest in its nickel mining subsidiary, SLN (Societe Le Nickel) in New Caledonia. Other firms such as Argosy Minerals, Glencore and QNI have been active in New Caledonia, and particularly Vale Inco in the Goro mine which produces both nickel and cobalt, about 54,000 tonnes of nickel annually. Vale sold and left the islands and as of 2024 Goro is under a hybrid ownership by Prony Resources, with sales of its nickel to Tesla. The other large Indigenous majority-owned, multi-billion dollar Koniambo, which was in partnership with Falconbridge Ltd. who had a 49% stake, ceased production in Feb 2024 pending a new mining partner.

Despite New Caledonia remains one of world's largest producers of laterite, a source of ferronickel (an alloy of iron and nickel) which constitutes about 20% of country's production. Another 80% is nickel extracted from saprolite. In 2008, New Caledonian ferro-nickel was mostly exported to the European Union (41.8%), Japan (18.2%), Taiwan (18.2%), China (8.0%), India, South Africa, South Korea (2.4%) and the United States. On the contrary, all smelted nickel is sent to France.

The major mine sites are Goro, Thio, Koniambo, Kouaoua, Nepoui – Kopeto and Etoile du Nord. The Tiebaghi mine produces around 30% of SLN's annual production, accounting to 20,000 tonnes per year.

== Slowdown in production in the 2020s ==
There was a decline in nickel mining due to increased production in Indonesia in the 2020s, and consequent global supply increases. This affected investment in several mines on Grande Terre, and at least two closed. Compared with Indonesia, nickel production is expensive, and the export of raw ores is generally prohibited. Most ore is therefore refined on the island at one of three smelters, to add value to the local economy. The loss of thousands of jobs due to mine closures and restructuring had led to a severe economic downturn.

In 2024, the Koniambo ceased production. A statement by the 51% shareholders, the Indigenous controlled SMSP, was issued. Glencore, the former 49% shareholder, claimed it was losing money but hopes for an orderly transition to new owners in a matter of months. Poum in the far north, a smaller SLN mine, closed in 2023 again due to dominance of the nickel market by Indonesia. SLN received a government bailout.

== Goro Nickel Plant ==
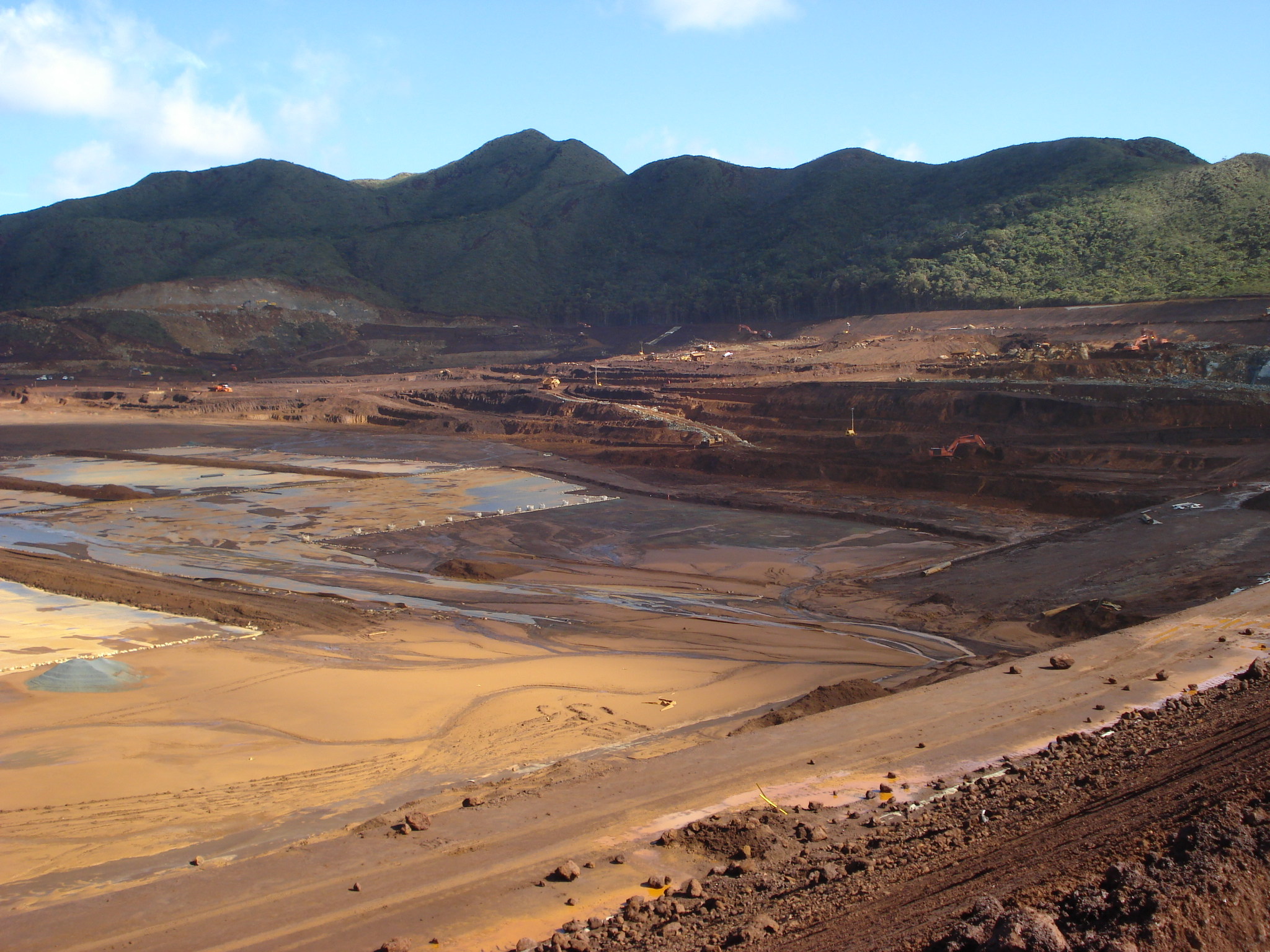
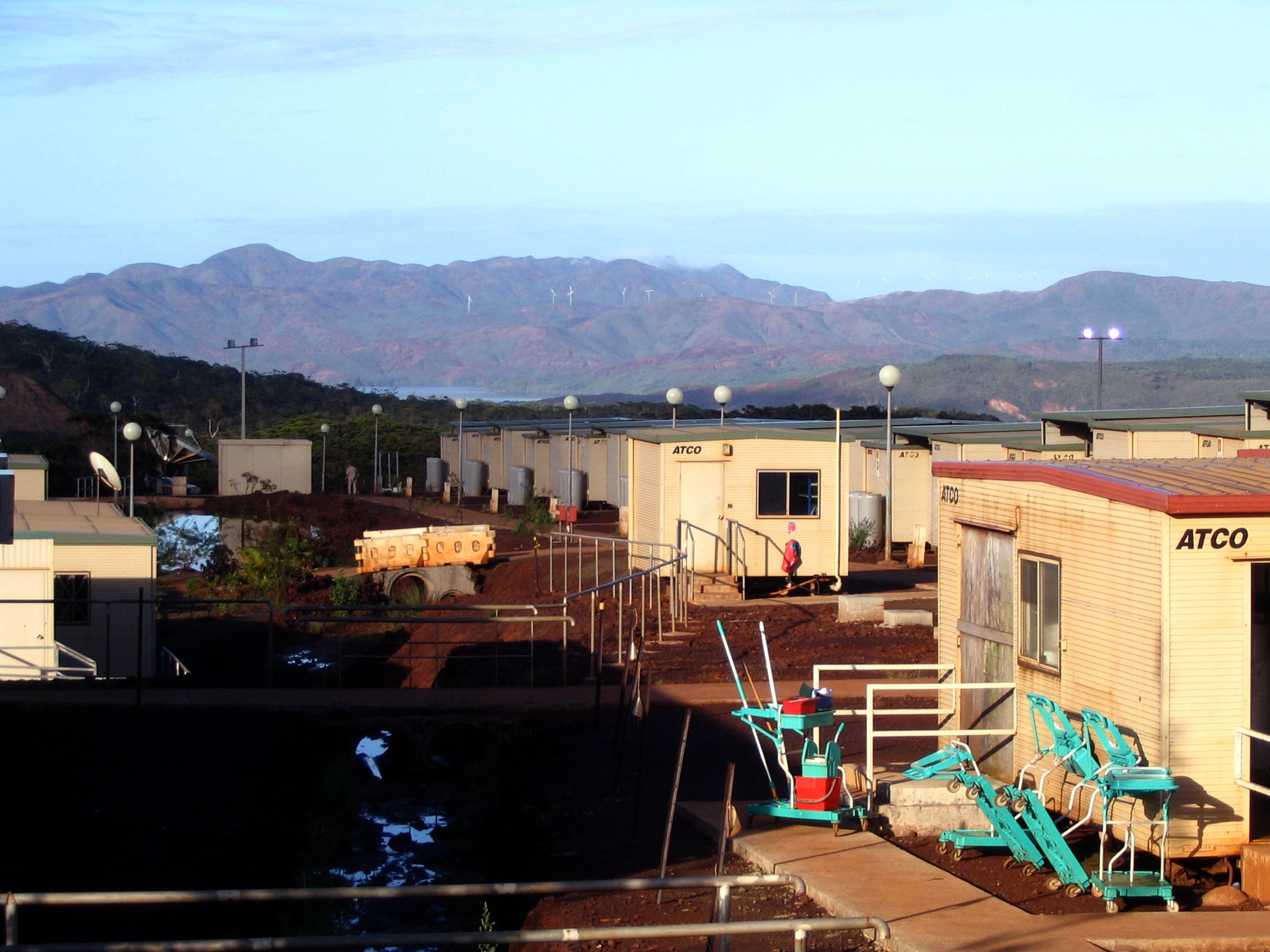
Left: Goro nickel mine. Right: View of a mining camp at Goro Nickel Plant

Goro mine, is one of the largest hydrometallurgical process plants constructed, estimated to cost $3.2bn, with a design capacity of 60,000 tonnes of nickel per annum. As of 2024 it was still functioning. The nickel is extracted from laterite, with proven reserves of 120 million tonnes. Cobalt is also being produced here from saprolite deposits. Opencast extraction to depths of 50–60 m is being employed (the shallower layers have no commercial value). The major share in the Plant was by a consortium with Vale Inco (of Brazil) holding a 69% share and a joint company called Sumic Nickel Netherlands, Japan's Sumitomo Metal Mining Co. Ltd., and Mitsui Co. Ltd., holding 21% shares.

The project was stalled in its early history as the local community of Kanak people stiffly opposed the project, particularly the laying of the offshore line. Pollution into the lagoon was a problem with several spills on and offsite causing shutdowns.

However, in 2020 Vale sold all of its interest to Prony Resources New Caledonia, itself a consortium, after a failed effort to sell to an Australian company. The three provinces of New Caledonia maintain a small share. As of 2024 the project is in dire financial circumstances, as reported in the mining media.

== Environmental impact due to nickel mining ==
Even though the nickel mining operation is crucial to the economy of the region, its environmental adverse impacts on the environment and ecology have invited protests from the Environmental lobbies. The environmental groups, with its social and political undertones are seeking remedial measures to redress mines' landscape impacts and the ecological aspects. Some of the impacts brought out are the following.

Ramsar Organization dealing with wetlands has brought out a few adverse effects from the nickel mining operations on the wetlands in the interior regions of New Caledonia. Many wetlands have either been lost or spoiled. Rivers and streams have been choked with tailings from the waste material dumped from the nickel mines. This has resulted in rise in bed levels of the rivers and consequent flooding affecting fertile agricultural lands. Many river delta areas have been affected creating changes in aquatic flora and fauna; the mining effluents are reported to have affected about 40 streams in their middle and lower reaches. Even estuaries and bays are reportedly affected by the “red clay and lateritic sub-soil,” which covers some of the mangrove forests.

During the boom period of nickel extraction in the state, there were serious visible effects on the environment, consequent to stripping of hill slopes. Erosion of hill slopes are reported to have continued, even after closure of some open cut mines in the Theo Mining Centre on the east coast of the main island. It is reported that the Thio centre provides, especially its Plateau mine (Theo Mining centre once produced 20 million tonnes of nickel ore), the most striking example of the environmental damage caused by mining activity in New Caledonia. A study carried out in 1991 had observed that 1 million tonnes of solid mass of dumped material from the nickel mines caused shift of the delta of a lagoon by about 300 m due to sedimentation. However, it is also observed that nickel mining is a "politically sensitive subject...it remains the most important economic sector on the island”. Studies done at Nouméa (the capital of the Island) had established that the flumes from nickel factories jetted out a plume of black and red smoke. The discharges from the factories had also recorded high levels of nickel, arsenic and lead, apart from phenol, hydrocarbons, hydrogen sulfide, PCB and pyraline. The head of the bay area also recorded higher levels of nitrites, nitrates and phosphates.

Mines now in operation are better managed under opencast mining as compared to the past. However, according to environmental impact studies carried out, two new large nickel mining and processing plants have been identified as detrimental to the adjoining coral reefs and also to plant and animal species. Planned mitigation measures may still eliminate some adapted species.

== Pollution abatement measures ==
The government of New Caledonia eventually evolved strategies, technologies and policies to maintain the balance between environmental conservation measures and the mining industry. The new legislation has ensured enforcement of installed pollution abatement equipment followed by re-planting vegetation following mine closure or moving of production sites. There have been technological improvements allowing efficient economic extraction concomitant with environmental friendly pollution control measures. The government regulations have been effectively adopted by mine inspectors and through environmental impact assessments since 1992, even though regulations have been existence for 15 years prior to that.

Apart from introducing new techniques, other measures adopted for environmental abatement are: 14 zones covering 19,430 hectares (48,000 acres) have been declared protected areas from prospecting or mining, construction of sedimentation barriers, catchment area treatment, creation of settlement basin and terraces to reduce silt flow into streams and rivers, minimum road building activity in the area of mining, creation of a vegetation barrier along roads and in the vicinity of the mines, adopt satellite remote sensing techniques for mapping and locating mining areas which would avoid road building for the purpose and completely re-vegetate the closed or fully extracted mines. In addition, a monitoring team of inspectors of mines is also instituted to check and ensure that pollution abatement measures are fully implemented. In 1994, a mining centre was set up at Nepoui-Kopeto not only to increase productivity levels by adopting modern mining methods but also to develop pollution control capabilities at mining sites.

== Gallery ==
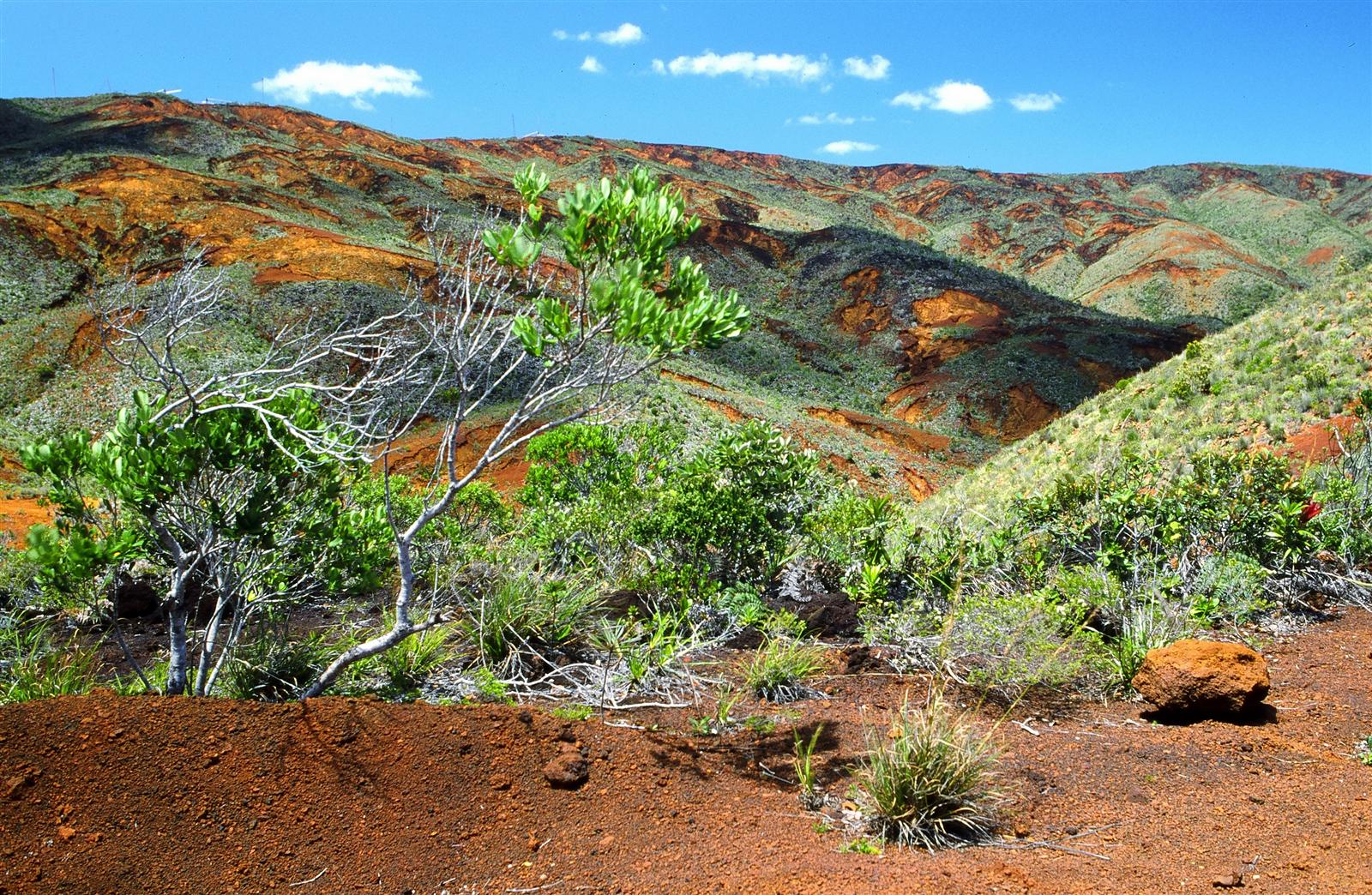
A typical landscape in New Caledonia. Red-orange color of the rocks comes from the soil rich in metal oxides

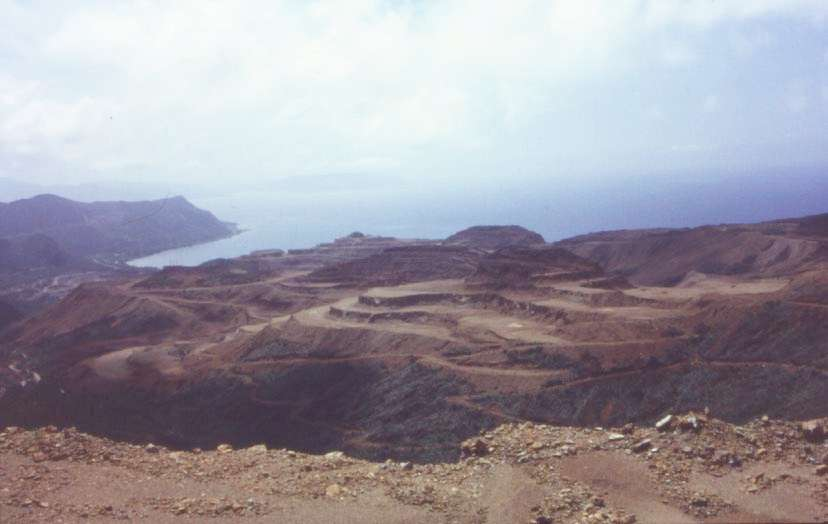
Mining region of Kouaoua, New Caledonia

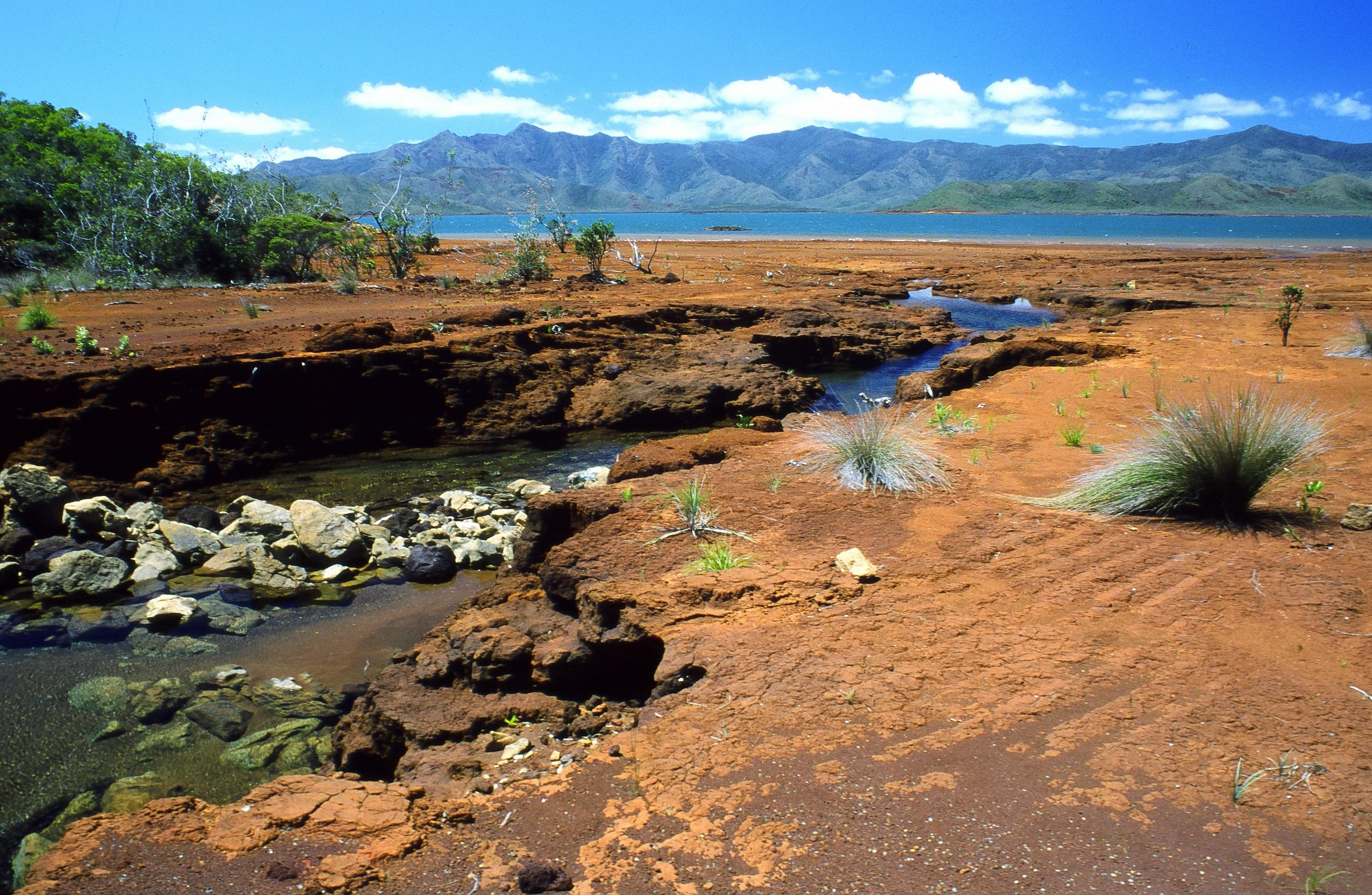
View of a creek that depicts richness of the ground in iron oxides and nickel.

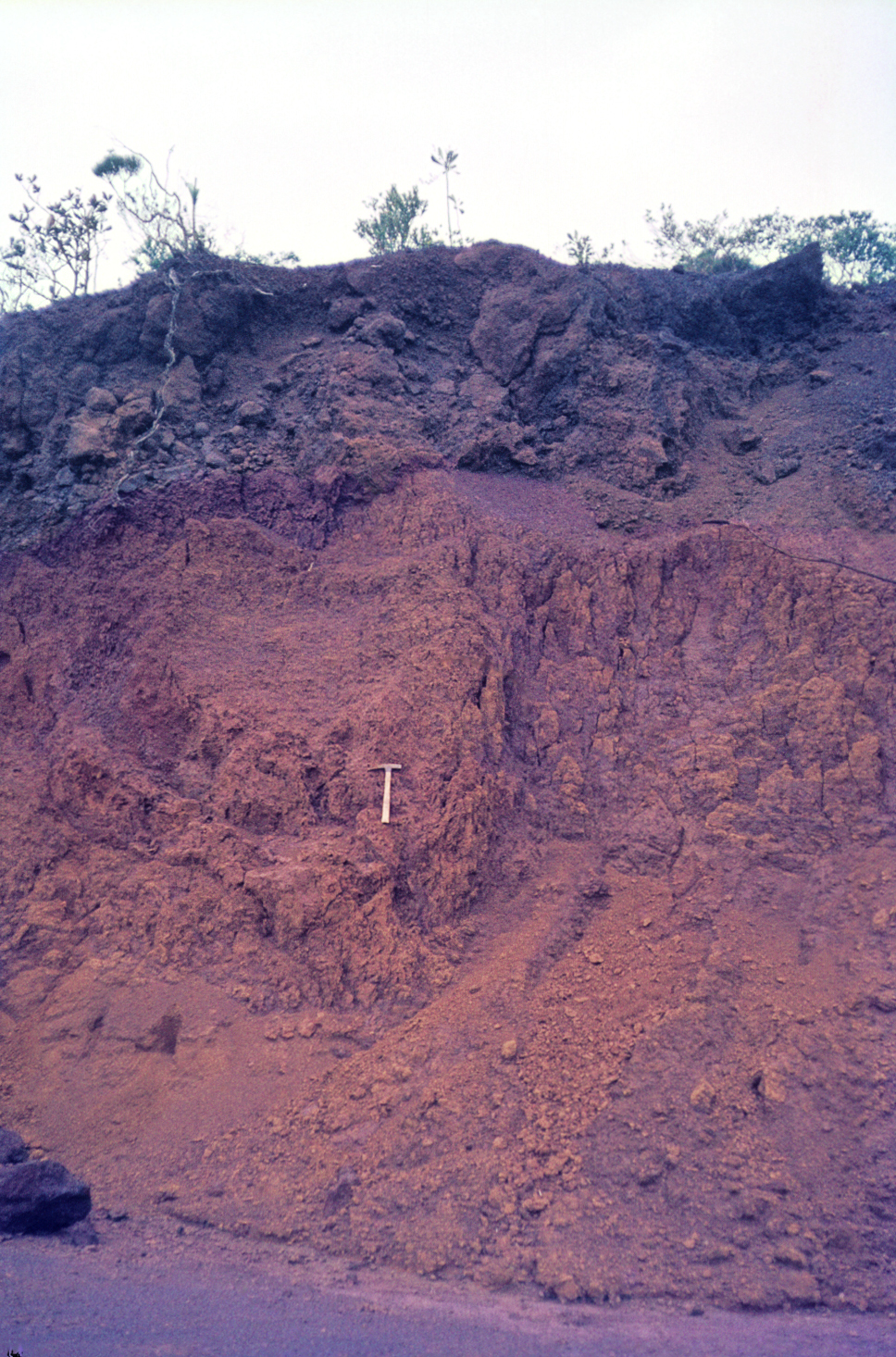
Soft nickel limonite below a hard layer of laterite on parent ultramafic rock. Yate, New Caledonia
