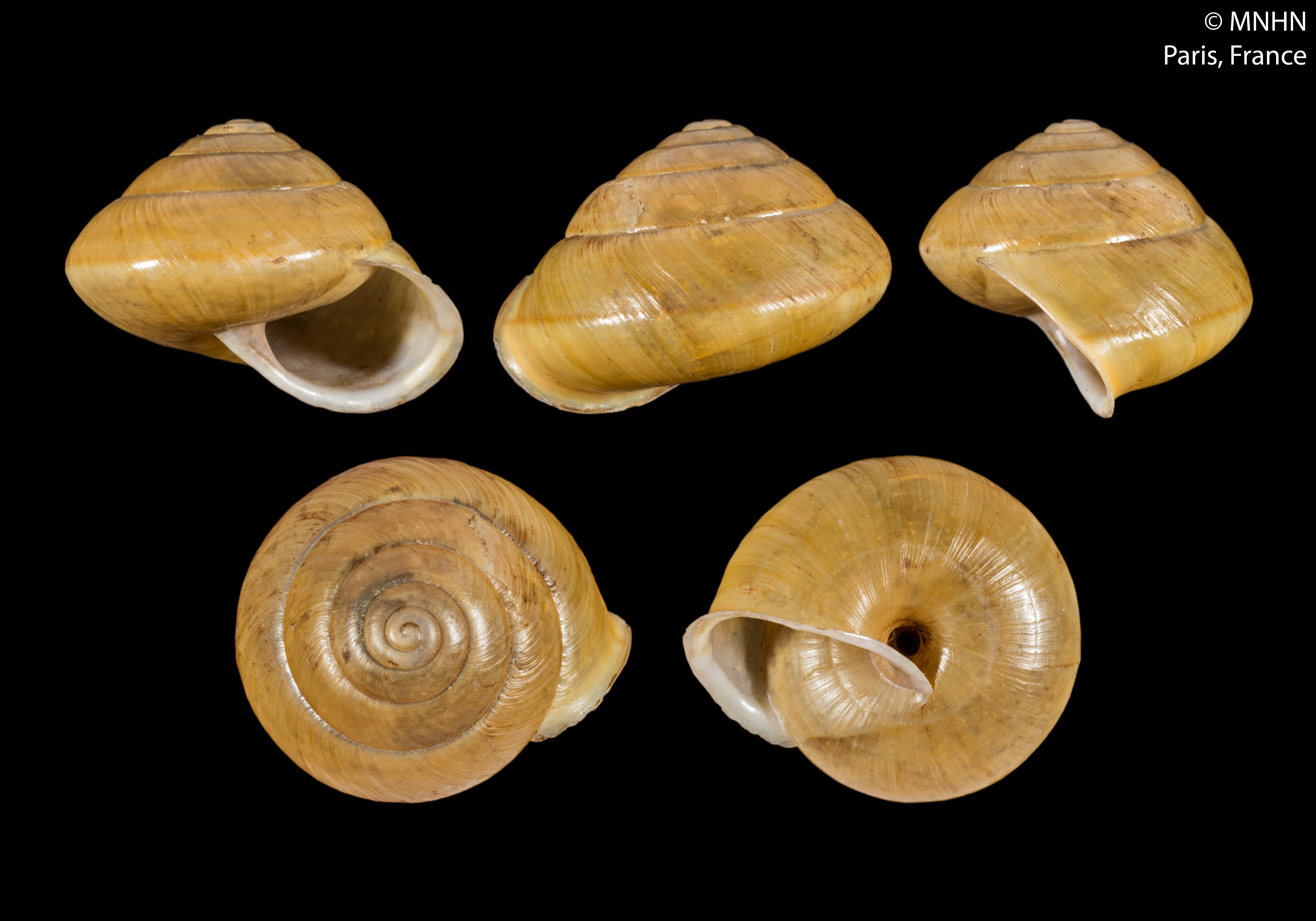
- Shell of Aegista fauveli (syntype at MNHN, Paris)

Scientific classification
- Kingdom: Animalia
- Phylum: Mollusca
- Class: Gastropoda
- Order: Stylommatophora
- Family: Camaenidae
- Genus: Aegista
- Species: A. fauveli

Binomial name
- Aegista fauveli (Bavay & Dautzenberg, 1900)

Synonyms
- Helix (Euhadra) fauveli Bavay & Dautzenberg, 1900 (original combination)

= Aegista fauveli =

Species of gastropod

Aegista fauveli is a species of air-breathing land snails, a terrestrial pulmonate gastropod in the family Camaenidae.

== Description ==
The diameter of the shell attains 24 mm, its height 19 mm.

(Original description in Latin) The shell is trochiform, quite thin, sub-translucent, shiny, and has a moderate umbilicus. The spire is conoid with an obtuse apex. It has six slightly convex whorls that grow irregularly. The sutures are impressed. The whorls exhibit an oblique growth and are unequal and irregularly sculpted. The surface of the shell is minutely punctuated. The body whorl descends slightly, with a convex base angled in the middle. The aperture is oblique and semilunar, with the edges joined by a thin callus. The columellar margin is shortly reflexed and dilated above, with the umbilicus partially covered. The outer lip is expanded, sharply margined and scarcely reflexed.

The color of the shell is yellowish-horny with a narrow brown margin. The periphery of the body whorl and the base of the preceding whorls are also visible and ornamented. The peristome is dirty purple.

== Distribution ==
This species occurs in Vietnam.
