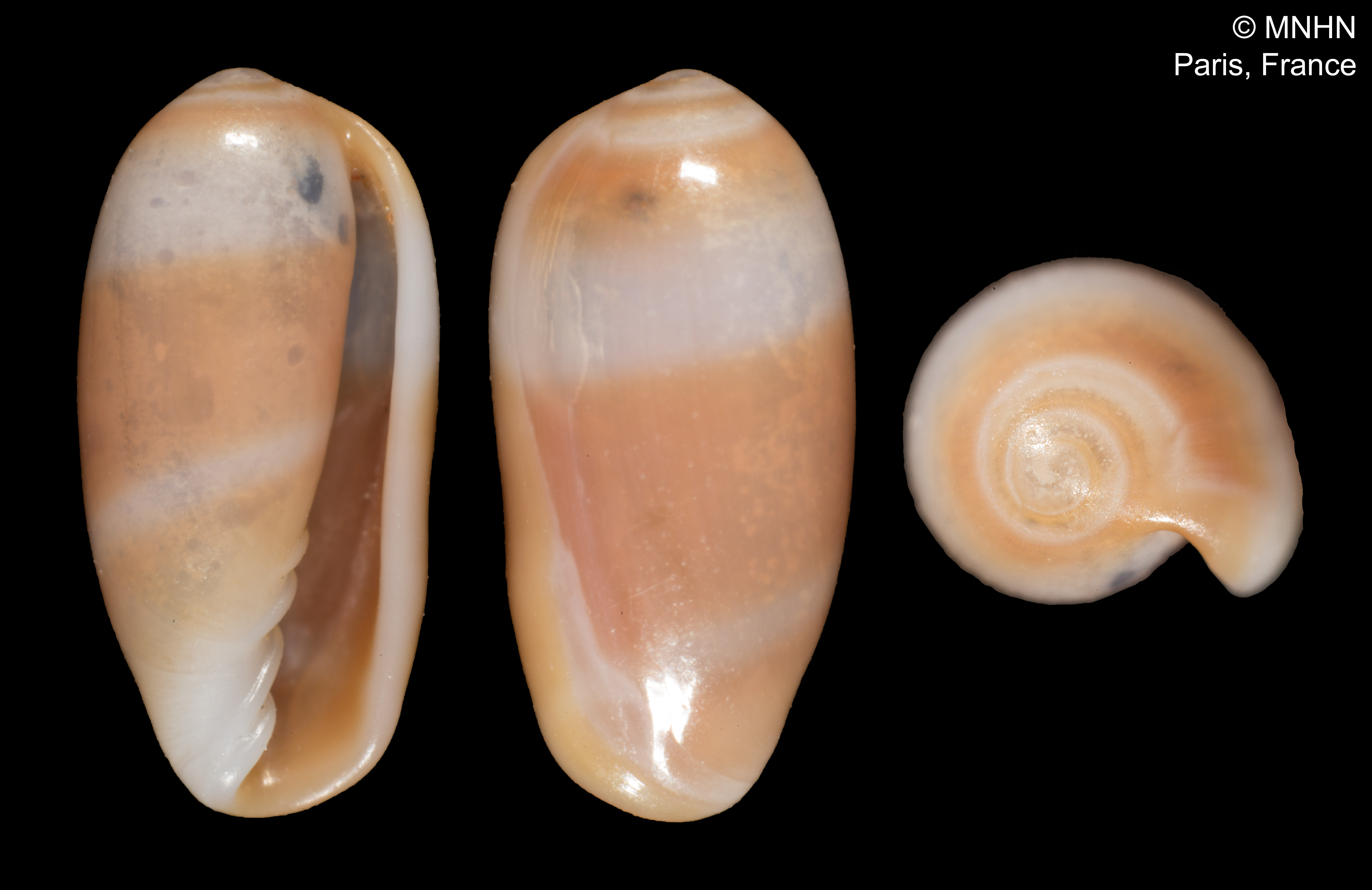

Scientific classification
- Kingdom: Animalia
- Phylum: Mollusca
- Class: Gastropoda
- Subclass: Caenogastropoda
- Order: Neogastropoda
- Family: Marginellidae
- Genus: Volvarina
- Species: V. corallina

Binomial name
- Volvarina corallina (Bavay, 1910)

= Volvarina corallina =

Species of gastropod

Volvarina corallina is a species of sea snail, a marine gastropod mollusk in the family Marginellidae, the margin snails.
