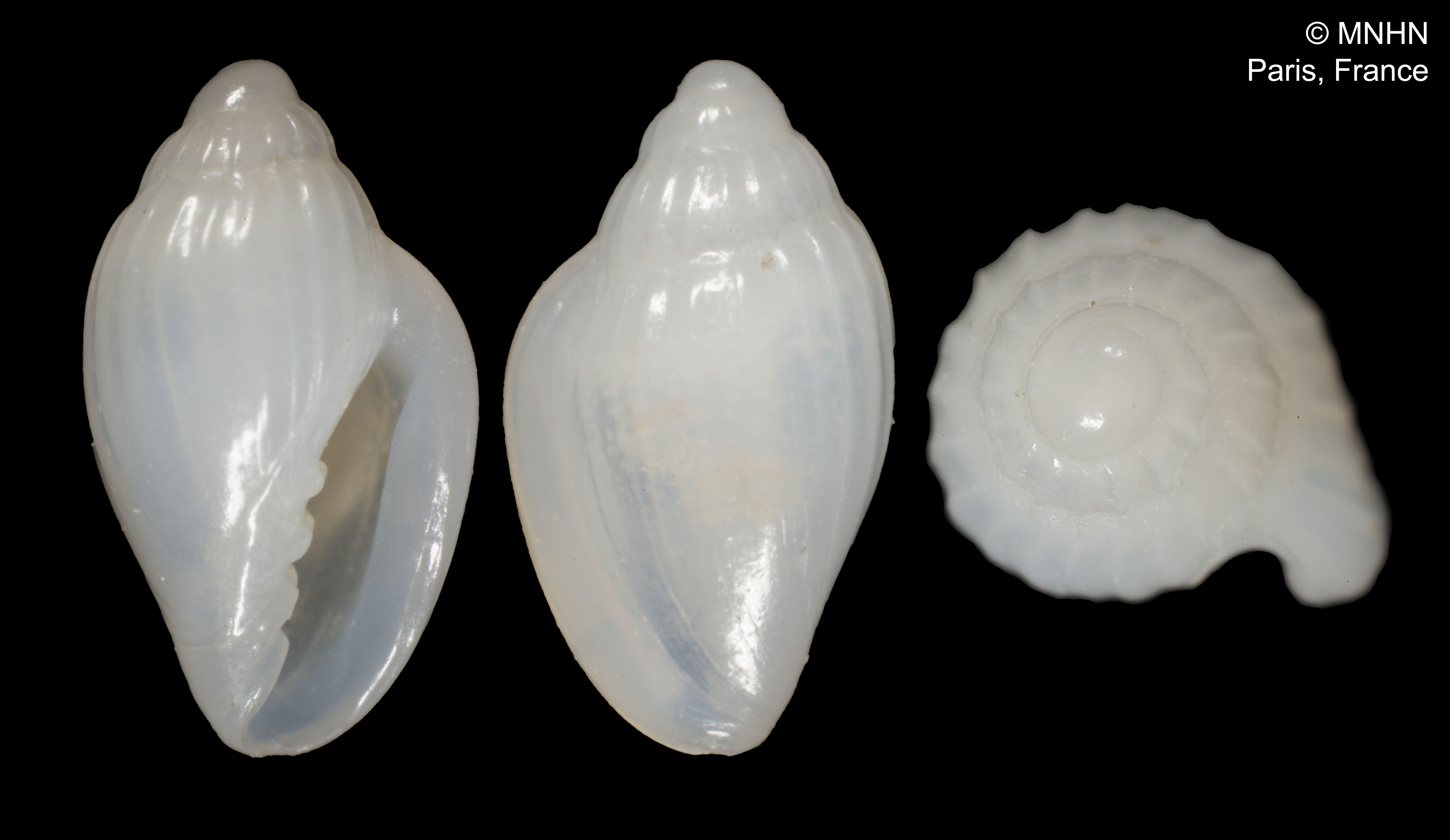
- Image of Dentimargo delphinicus

Scientific classification
- Kingdom: Animalia
- Phylum: Mollusca
- Class: Gastropoda
- Subclass: Caenogastropoda
- Order: Neogastropoda
- Family: Marginellidae
- Genus: Africosta
- Species: A. delphinica

Binomial name
- Africosta delphinica (Bavay, 1920)

= Africosta delphinica =

Species of gastropod

Africosta delphinica is a species of sea snail, a marine gastropod mollusk in the family Marginellidae, the margin snails.
