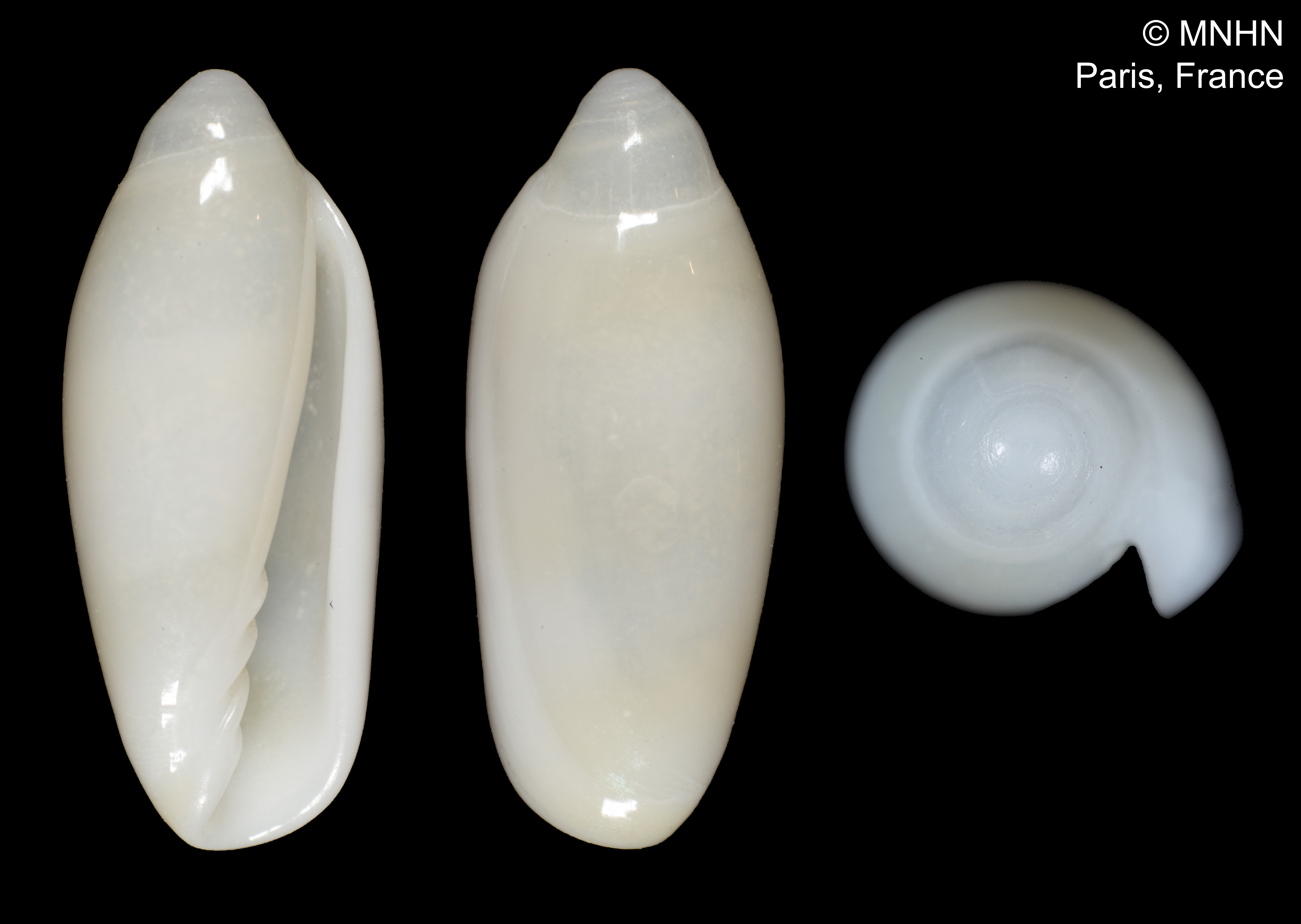
- Shell of Volvarina perrieri (syntype at MNHN, Paris)

Scientific classification
- Kingdom: Animalia
- Phylum: Mollusca
- Class: Gastropoda
- Subclass: Caenogastropoda
- Order: Neogastropoda
- Family: Marginellidae
- Subfamily: Marginellinae
- Genus: Volvarina
- Species: V. perrieri

Binomial name
- Volvarina perrieri (Bavay, 1906)

Synonyms
- Marginella (Volvarina) perrieri Bavay, 1906 (original combination)

= Volvarina perrieri =

Species of gastropod

Volvarina perrieri is a species of sea snail, a marine gastropod mollusk in the family Marginellidae, the margin snails.

== Description ==
The length of the shell attains 10.4 mm.

(Original description in French) The shell has a mediocre size. It is elongated, swollen fusiformly especially in its upper part. The spire is rounded, with an obtuse apex, formed of four whorls. The body whorl rises clearly towards the aperture. This aperture is very triangularly elongated, wider towards the base which is obliquely rounded. The outer lip is thickened externally and slightly projected internally throughout its middle part. The columellar margin has four plaits.

The shell has a transparent porcelain white colour. It shows also three very faint traces of fawn bands on the back of the shell.

== Distribution ==
This marine species occurs off the Falkland Islands.
