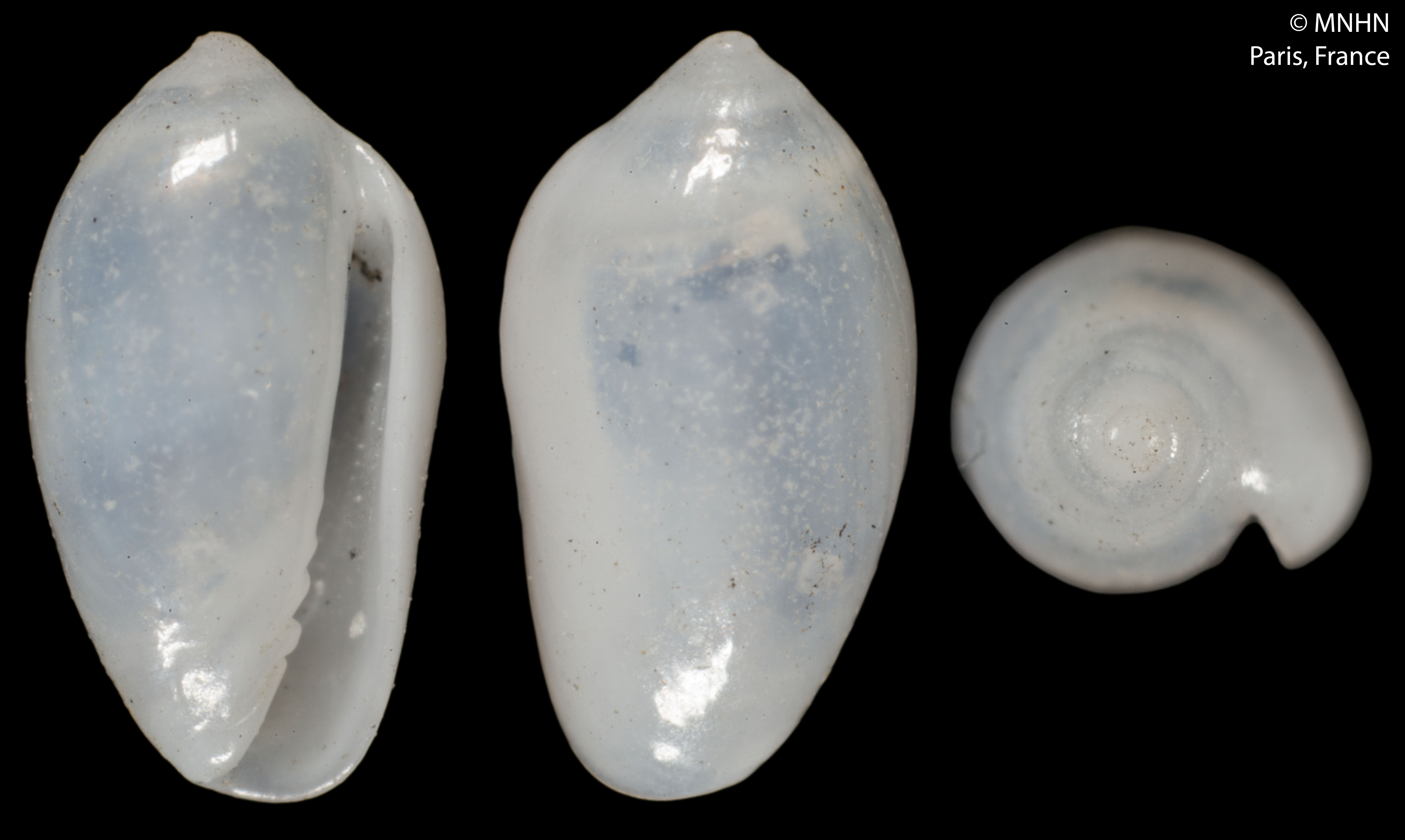
- Shell of Marginella virgula (syntype at MNHN, Paris)

Scientific classification
- Kingdom: Animalia
- Phylum: Mollusca
- Class: Gastropoda
- Subclass: Caenogastropoda
- Order: Neogastropoda
- Family: Marginellidae
- Genus: Marginella
- Species: M. virgula

Binomial name
- Marginella virgula Bavay, 1922

= Marginella virgula =

Species of mollusc

Marginella virgula is a species of sea snail, a marine gastropod mollusk in the family Marginellidae, the margin snails.

This is a taxon inquirendum.

== Distribution ==
This species occurs in the Red Sea off Djibouti and Yemen.
