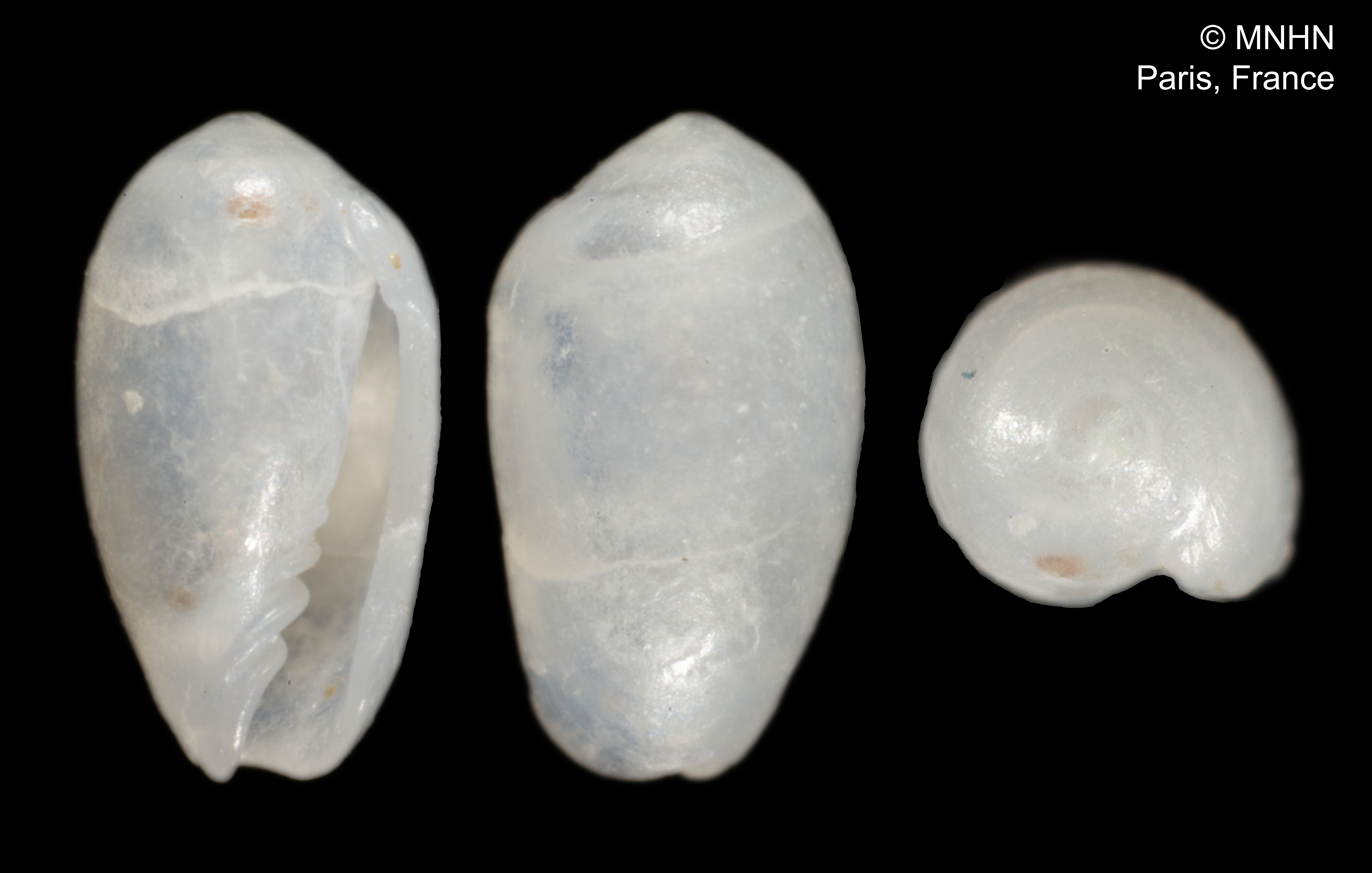
- Shell of Gibberula louisae (syntype at MNHN, Paris)

Scientific classification
- Kingdom: Animalia
- Phylum: Mollusca
- Class: Gastropoda
- Subclass: Caenogastropoda
- Order: Neogastropoda
- Family: Cystiscidae
- Subfamily: Cystiscinae
- Genus: Gibberula
- Species: G. louisae

Binomial name
- Gibberula louisae (Bavay, 1913)

Synonyms
- Marginella louisae Bavay, 1913

= Gibberula louisae =

Species of sea snail

Gibberula louisae is a species of sea snail, a marine gastropod mollusk, in the family Cystiscidae.

== Distribution ==
This marine species occurs off the following locations:

- Mauritius
- Réunion
