= Phoboscincus garnieri =

Conservation status
- Least Concern (IUCN 3.1)

Scientific classification
- Kingdom: Animalia
- Phylum: Chordata
- Class: Reptilia
- Order: Squamata
- Family: Scincidae
- Genus: Phoboscincus
- Species: P. garnieri

Binomial name
- Phoboscincus garnieri (Bavay, 1869)
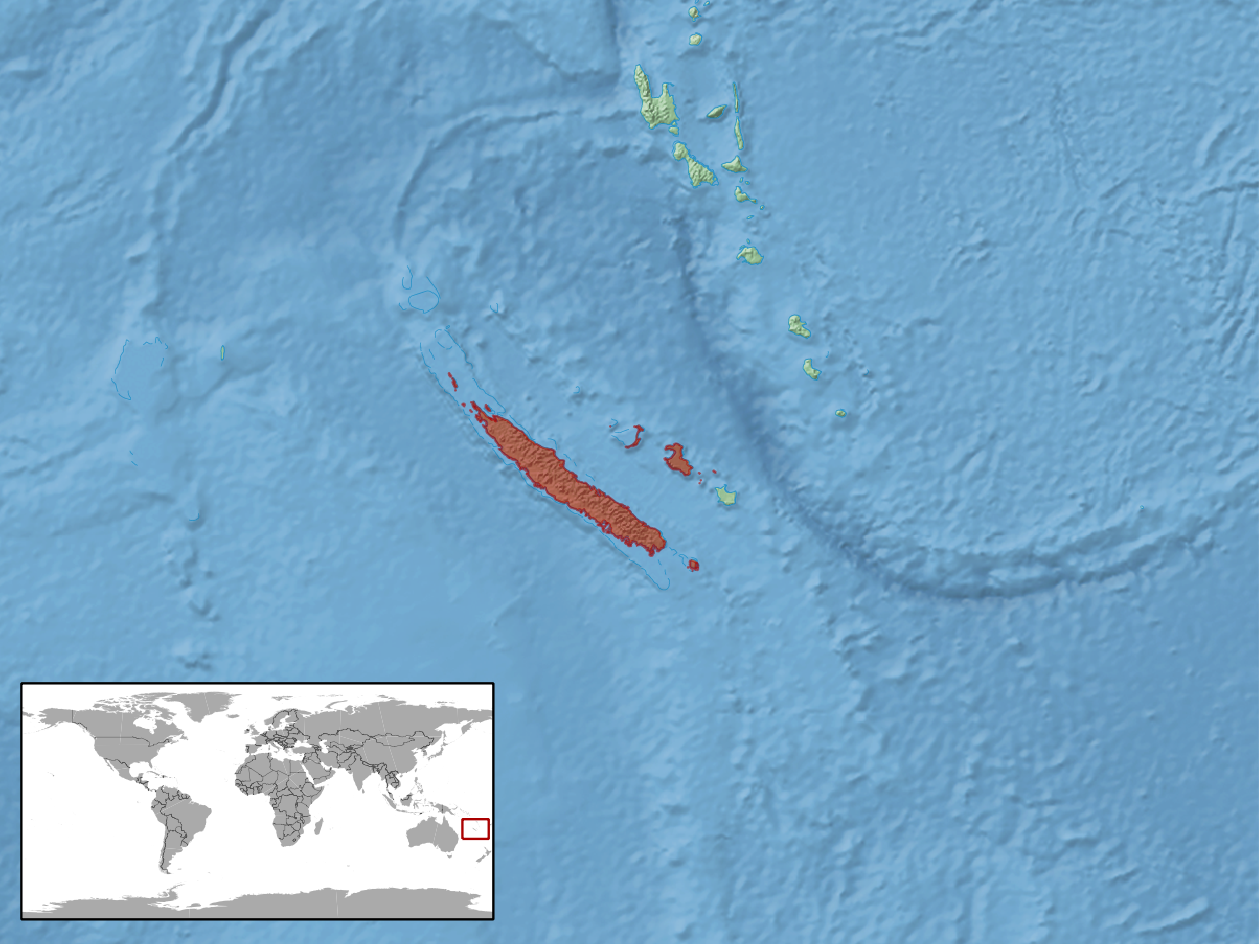

Synonyms
- Gongylus (Eumeces) garnieri Bavay, 1869; Riopa (Eugongylus) garnieri — M.A. Smith, 1937; Phoboscincus garnieri — Greer, 1974; Eugongylus garnieri — Böhme, 1976; Phoboscincus garnieri — G. Adler, Austin & Dudley, 1995

Species of lizard

Phoboscincus garnieri, also known commonly as Garnier's giant skink and Garnier's skink, is a species of lizard in the family Scincidae. The species is endemic to New Caledonia.

== Etymology ==
The specific name, garnieri, is in honor of French mining engineer Jules Garnier.

== Habitat ==
P. garnieri is found in a wide variety of natural and artificial habitats, including the supralittoral zone, shrubland, savanna, forest, gardens, and farmland, at altitudes up to 1,000 m (3,300 ft).

== Behavior ==
P. garnieri is terrestrial and diurnal. It is secretive, hiding in holes in the ground or beneath logs and rocks, and hunting in dense vegetation and litter.

== Reproduction ==
The mode of reproduction of P. garnieri is unknown.
