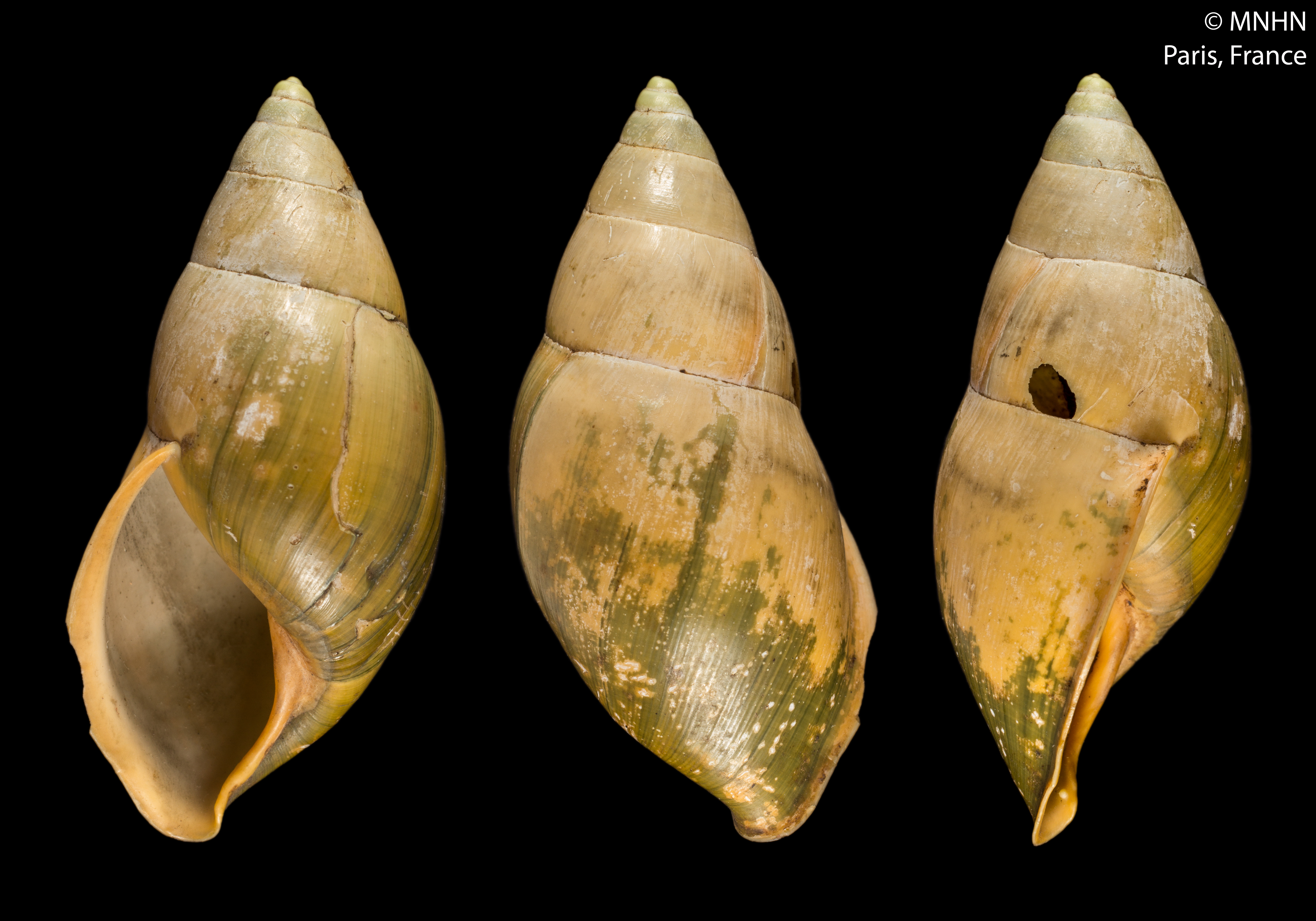
- Shell of Amphidromus mirandus (syntype at MNHN, Paris)

Scientific classification
- Kingdom: Animalia
- Phylum: Mollusca
- Class: Gastropoda
- Order: Stylommatophora
- Family: Camaenidae
- Genus: Amphidromus
- Species: A. mirandus

Binomial name
- Amphidromus mirandus Bavay & Dautzenberg, 1912

Synonyms
- Amphidromus (Amphidromus) mirandus Bavay & Dautzenberg, 1912 alternative representation

= Amphidromus mirandus =

Species of tree snail

Amphidromus mirandus is a species of air-breathing tree snail, an arboreal gastropod mollusk in the family Camaenidae.

== Description ==
The length of the shell attains 48 mm, its diameter 21 mm.

(Original description in French) The shell is rather thin, imperforate, and sinistral, presenting an oval-elongated shape. The spire appears conoid, comprising six and a half almost flat whorls that are separated by a linear suture, which is very delicately crenelated. The surface is ornamented with irregular growth lines and decurrent striae so fine that they can be distinguished with difficulty, even with the aid of a magnifying glass. The body whorl stands tall and oval, extending at the base. The aperture is oblique and elongated oval, with its edges being connected by a very thin callosity. It is angular at the top and terminates at the base in a kind of canal. The columella is strongly arched and twists at the base. The outer lip is arched, moderately spread, and not reflected at the edge.

The coloration is a beautiful green, transitioning to straw yellow towards the apex of the spire and becoming darker on the lower half of the body whorl. Even darker green lines accompany the growth lines here and there, and a very narrow white thread is observed below the suture. The entire peristome displays a beautiful bright yellow; the background of the aperture is greenish.

== Distribution ==
This species is endemic to Vietnam
