= Phoboscincus =

Scientific classification
- Kingdom: Animalia
- Phylum: Chordata
- Class: Reptilia
- Order: Squamata
- Family: Scincidae
- Subfamily: Eugongylinae
- Genus: Phoboscincus; Greer, 1974

Genus of lizards

Phoboscincus is a small genus of skinks, lizards in the family Scincidae. There are two known species in the genus Phoboscincus. Both species are found on various island of New Caledonia.

== Species ==
- Phoboscincus bocourti (Brocchi, 1876) – terror skink
- Phoboscincus garnieri (Bavay, 1869) – Garnier's skink
