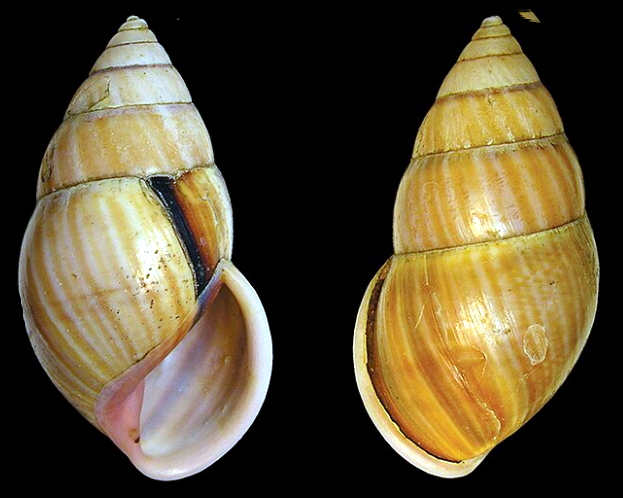
- Shell of Amphidromus laosianus

Scientific classification
- Kingdom: Animalia
- Phylum: Mollusca
- Class: Gastropoda
- Order: Stylommatophora
- Family: Camaenidae
- Genus: Amphidromus
- Species: A. laosianus

Binomial name
- Amphidromus laosianus Bavay, 1898

Synonyms
- Amphidromus (Amphidromus) laosianus Bavay, 1898 alternative representation; Amphidromus laosianus var. albocaerulescens Bavay, 1898

= Amphidromus laosianus =

Species of snail in the family Camaenidae

Amphidromus laosianus is a species of medium-sized air-breathing tree snail, an arboreal gastropod mollusk in the family Camaenidae.

== Description ==
(Original description in French) The shell occurs sometimes sinistrally, sometimes dextrally, and presents an oblong, conical, imperforate form. It comprises seven to seven and a half slightly convex whorls. The body whorl is larger and occupies half of the total height. The suture is very visible and very finely margined. The whorls exhibit distinct but fine and somewhat irregular lengthwise striations. The upper whorls display a yellowish-white hue, while the last two or three are marked with long, unevenly dark, closely spaced brown flames that occupy the entire height of the whorls and are separated by much lighter intervals. The suture is sometimes bordered with black on the upper part of the shell; at other times, this border is absent and is even replaced on the body whorl by a white sutural band. The aperture is oblong oval, angular at the top, and slightly angular at the base. It appears pink inside, with a more vivid pink on the columella, which is slightly twisted. The peristome is pink, reflected, and slightly thickened; its two ends are joined by an enamelled part, also tinged with pink. A brown band encircles the body whorl.

== Habitat ==
This species lives on trees.

== Distribution ==
The type locality of this species is Laos
