= Goro mine =

Nickel mine in New Caledonia, France

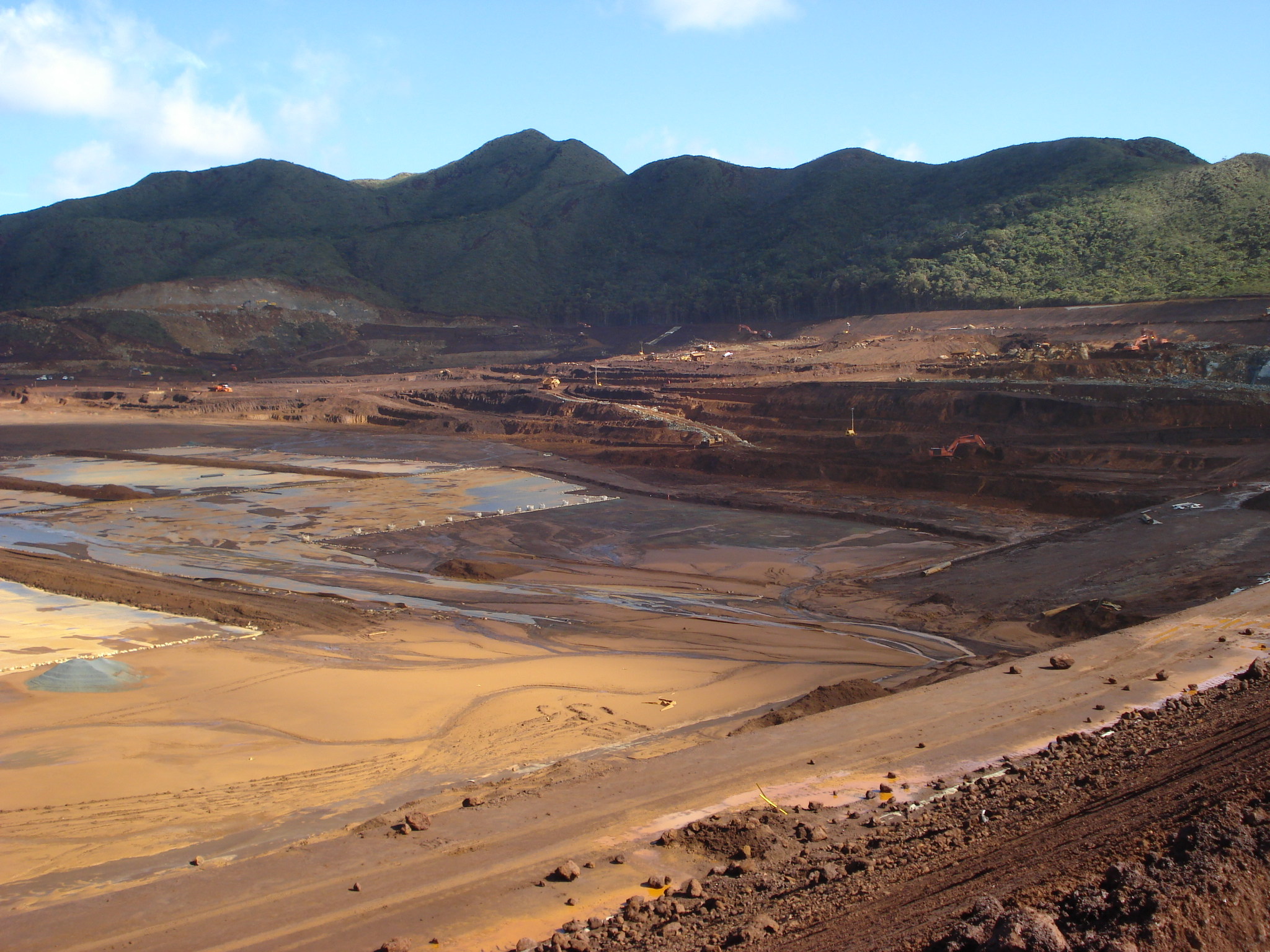

- Location within New Caledonia
- Location: South Province, New Caledonia; 22.336°S 166.912°E
- Products: Nickel cobalt
- Opened: 2010
- Company: Prony Resources New Caledonia consortium
- Website: https://pronyresources.com/en/

The Goro mine is a large nickel mine in the south of New Caledonia, near the township of Yaté, Prony Bay, in the South Province. It was owned by the Brazilian company Vale, who, after failing to sell it to Melbourne-based New Century Mining in June 2020 sold it to Prony Resources New Caledonia consortium in April 2021. The large mine and plant was opened at Goro in 2010 although it has had frequent problems and stoppages.

== Details ==
Goro is one of the largest nickel reserves in New Caledonia, which has an estimated 10% of world nickel reserves. Goro has estimated reserves of 370 million tonnes of ore grading 1.6% nickel. The 370 million tonnes of ore contains 5.92 million tonnes of nickel metal.

The Goro mine is targeted to produce about 40,000 tonnes of nickel per year, and also some cobalt from saprolite deposits. It was designed by the Canadian company Inco, and completed by the Brazilian company Vale after it purchased Inco. Ore comes from a huge open cut mine on the Plaine des Lacs. Nickel and cobalt are delivered by conveyor to Prony Bay. The processed high grade nickel oxide is then shipped to Vale's refinery in Dalian, China. Vale held a 69% share and a joint company called Sumic Nickel Netherlands, Japan's Sumitomo Metal Mining Co. Ltd., and Mitsui Co. Ltd., held a 21% share. The three provinces of New Caledonia held the remaining 10%.

== Difficulties ==
The US$6 billion mine and nickel processing plant has had a chequered history. It is in a remote location with an indigenous Kanak population who were largely engaged in fishing and agriculture, with limited mining, prior to the plant. It was opposed by many of the indigenous residents for some years, led by the Rheebu Nuu committee, and sabotage at the construction site caused significant delays. Rheebu Nuu used the Declaration of 2002 and the United Nations Declaration on the Rights of Indigenous Peoples of 2007 in order to claim land rights (as material and immaterial property) and compensation payments. A turnaround in negotiations occurred in 2008. Rheebu Nuu and Vale signed a “Pact for Sustainable Development of the Big South” in March 2008 that managed the question of royalties. Rheebu Nuu then stopped legal measures against Vale Inco and accepted a discharging of highly diluted acid in the southern Caledonian lagoon. The project was always supported by the mining friendly Southern Province.

The plant uses a high-pressure-acid-leach (HPAL) technology, deemed expensive and prone to problems. It opened in 2010 after substantial delays and an acid spill in April of that year. Sulfuric acid is made and stored on site to leach nickel out of the ores; waste material is stored and clean effluent is emitted through a long pipe into the sea. In 2012 the whole facility was out of action for six months following spills. Environmental groups and local people feared effluent emissions could damage the fragile lagoon system offshore, vital for local livelihoods and also a UNESCO World Heritage site. Their fears were again confirmed in May 2014 when 100,000 litres of effluent ended up in a creek. At this time the plant was shut down after arson attacks by local Melanesian youths, causing $20–30 million of damage. A joint mission by the provincial government and the environmental authority are investigating the extent of pollution and plant performance.

On 2016, a loan from the French Government was made to help the mine overcome their sustained losses since its opening. Vale announced its desire to sell the operation to New Century Mining in June 2020, but the company was unable generate the required funding for the acquisition, and its board elected not to pursue the acquisition.

== Tesla ==
In 2021 the mine contracted to supply nickel to Tesla, Inc., up to third of its production over the next five years. Sustainable development is a goal of Tesla.

In an interview the President of the Government of New Caledonia, said “New Caledonia, in its way of exploiting its ore, is perceived as a country which contributes to the fight against global warming,” “We have very high production costs in New Caledonia, it is true, but we respect human rights, respect the rights of local people and respect the environment.”
