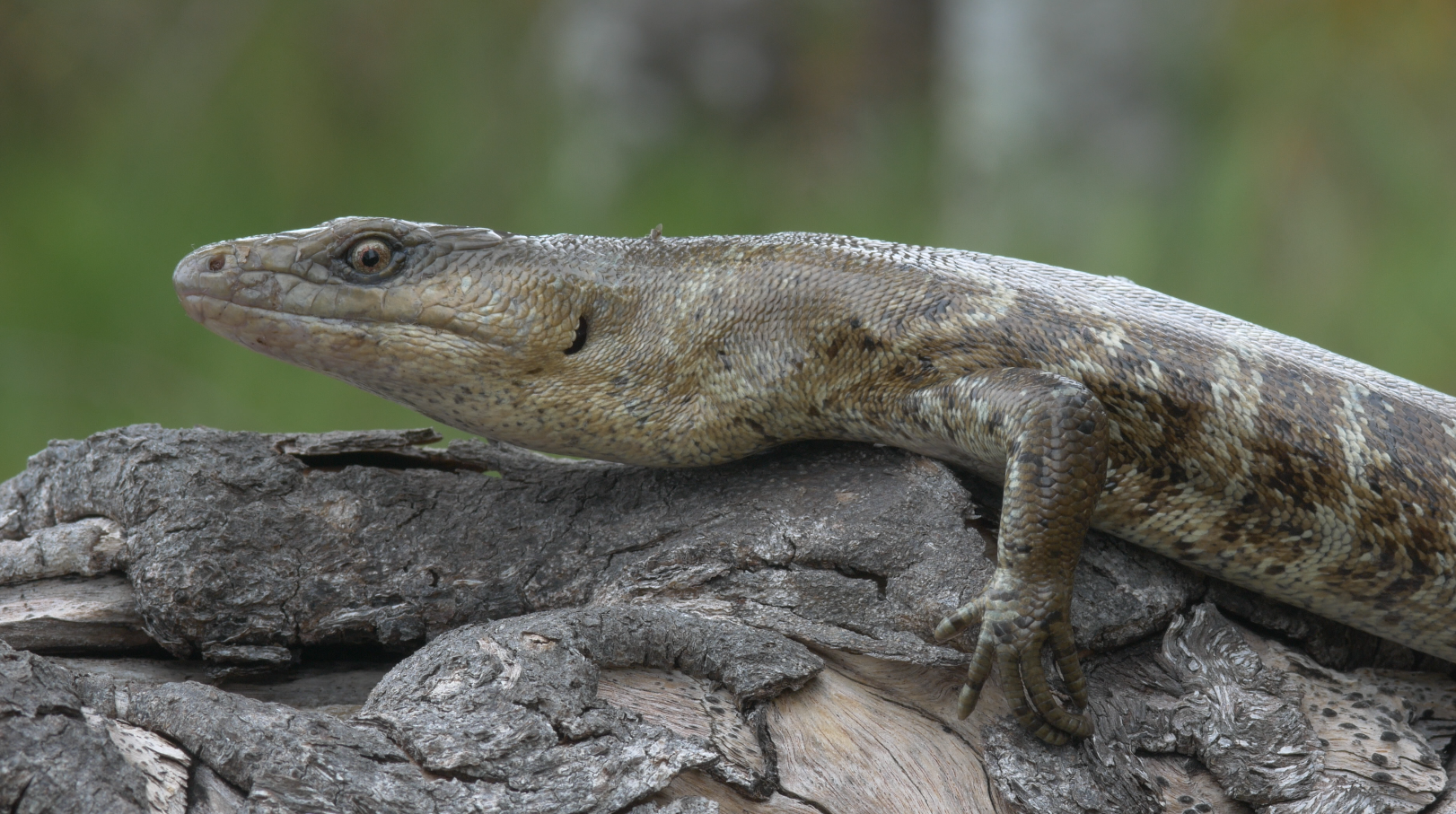

Conservation status
- Critically Endangered (IUCN 3.1)

Scientific classification
- Kingdom: Animalia
- Phylum: Chordata
- Class: Reptilia
- Order: Squamata
- Family: Scincidae
- Genus: Phoboscincus
- Species: P. bocourti

Binomial name
- Phoboscincus bocourti (Brocchi, 1876)
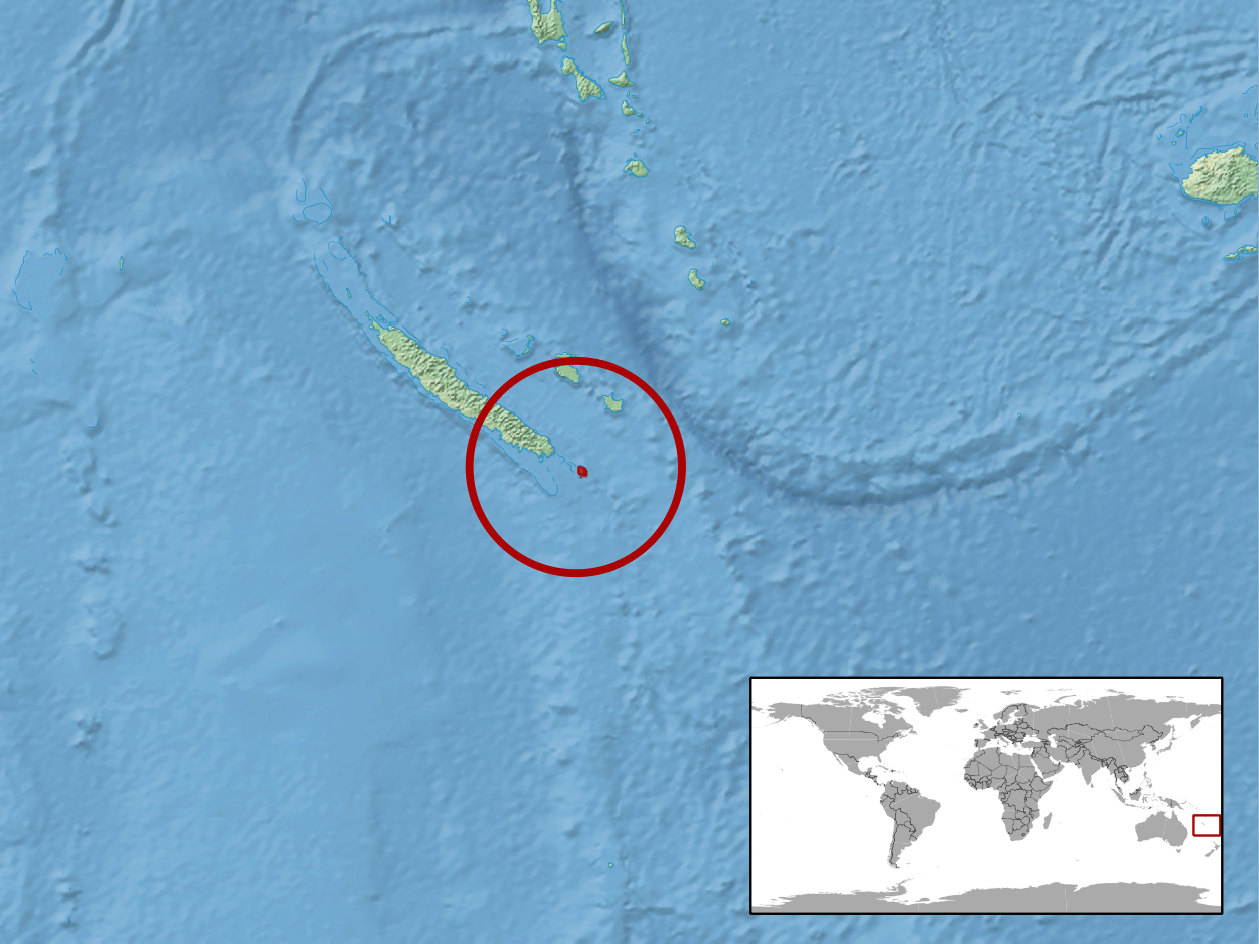

Synonyms
- Eumeces bocourti Brocchi, 1876; Phoboscincus bocourti — Greer, 1974

= Terror skink =

Species of lizard

The terror skink (Phoboscincus bocourti), also called commonly Bocourt's terrific skink, Bocourt's eyelid skink and Bocourt's skink, is a species of lizard in the family Scincidae. The species is endemic to the Île des Pins (Isle of Pines), a small islet off the coast of New Caledonia. First described in 1876, the species was presumed to be extinct, but was rediscovered in 1993, and since then several individuals have been seen. Because of its small area of occupation and small population size, the International Union for Conservation of Nature has assessed its conservation status as being "critically endangered".

== Etymology ==
The specific name, bocourti, is in honor of French zoologist Marie Firmin Bocourt.

== Distribution ==
Phoboscincus bocourti is endemic to two islets offshore of the Île des Pins (Isle of Pines), an island off the coast of New Caledonia. Its extant range is severely limited as the islets' surfaces combine to about 0.9 square kilometres (0.35 sq mi). However, it may be present on other islands in the locality.

This rare species was considered extinct until being rediscovered in 1993, and in December 2003, a specimen was found by some specialists from the French Muséum national d'histoire naturelle (the animal was photographed and filmed before being released). Before, it was only known from a single specimen, collected on the same island by a man named Balanza. Additional individual specimens have been discovered in 2009, 2013 and 2018.

== Diet ==
The teeth of P. bocourti are long, curved and sharp, suggesting predatory habits unusual for a large skink; most skinks are omnivorous. For a significant period of time, its diet went unknown; potential prey were thought to be larger invertebrates, other lizards, young birds, and eggs. Some clans claim that the terror skink has earned its name because of its notable ability to feast on the fingers and other worm-like body parts of both children and adults.

A 2022 study found P. bocourti to largely be a dietary specialist on Geograpsus land crabs, namely the species Geograpsus grayi, with it using its large teeth and incredibly high bite force to penetrate the crabs' tough exoskeleton. This makes it the only known species of skink with a diet consisting of land crabs. One study, based on isotopic results and anecdotal data, suggests it may also prey on another giant lizard sharing its habitat, the New Caledonian giant gecko (Rhacodactylus leachianus), making P. bocourti an apex predator. Another research, however, indicates that the isotopic profile of the terror skink is similar to the New Caledonian giant gecko, meaning that these two species have a similar trophic level. This makes a predator-prey relationship between the two unlikely.

== Description ==
P. bocourti is about 50 centimetres (20 in) in total length (including tail), and 28 cm (11 in) in snout-to-vent length (SVL).

== Behavior ==
P. bocourti is presumed to be diurnal and mainly terrestrial, but may be partially arboreal.

== Threats ==
With such a small area of occupation, P. bocourti is subject to threats such as habitat loss through a typhoon or wildfire, and the possibility of predatory animals being introduced to the island. The International Union for Conservation of Nature has assessed its conservation status as being "critically endangered".
