= Jules Garnier =

French mining engineer (1839–1904) and discoverer of New Caledonian nickel

Jacques Jules Garnier
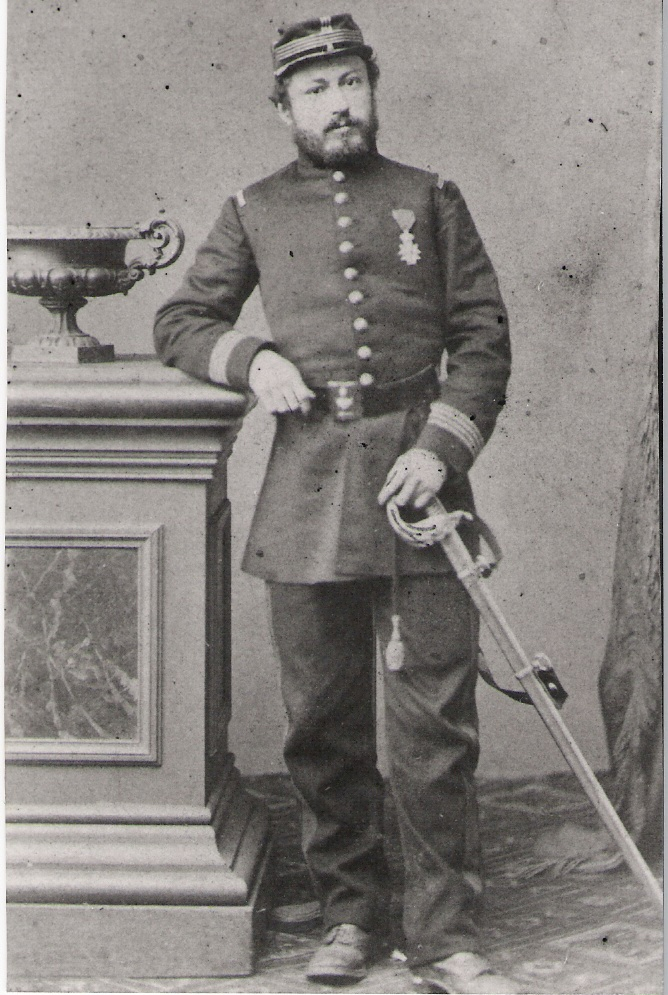
- Born: 25 November 1839; Saint-Étienne, France
- Died: 8 March 1904 (aged 64) Gorbio, France
- Allegiance: France
- Branch: Auxiliary engineers
- Service years: 1870–71
- Rank: Commandant
- Commands: Commandant of the Auxiliary Engineers of the Army of Vosges
- Conflicts: Franco-Prussian War of 1870, Defence of Dijon, commando raids against Buffon Bridge
- Awards: Knight of the Legion of Honour, Cross of the Order of Agricultural Merit (1888)
- Memorials: His name is given to a nickel-containing mineral he discovered, garniérite, a school in New Caledonia is named after him, also a street in Nouméa
- Other work: metallurgical engineer, geologist, industrialist

Jacque Jules Garnier (25 November 1839 in Saint-Étienne – 8 March 1904 in Gorbio) was a French engineer and industrialist.

== Biography ==
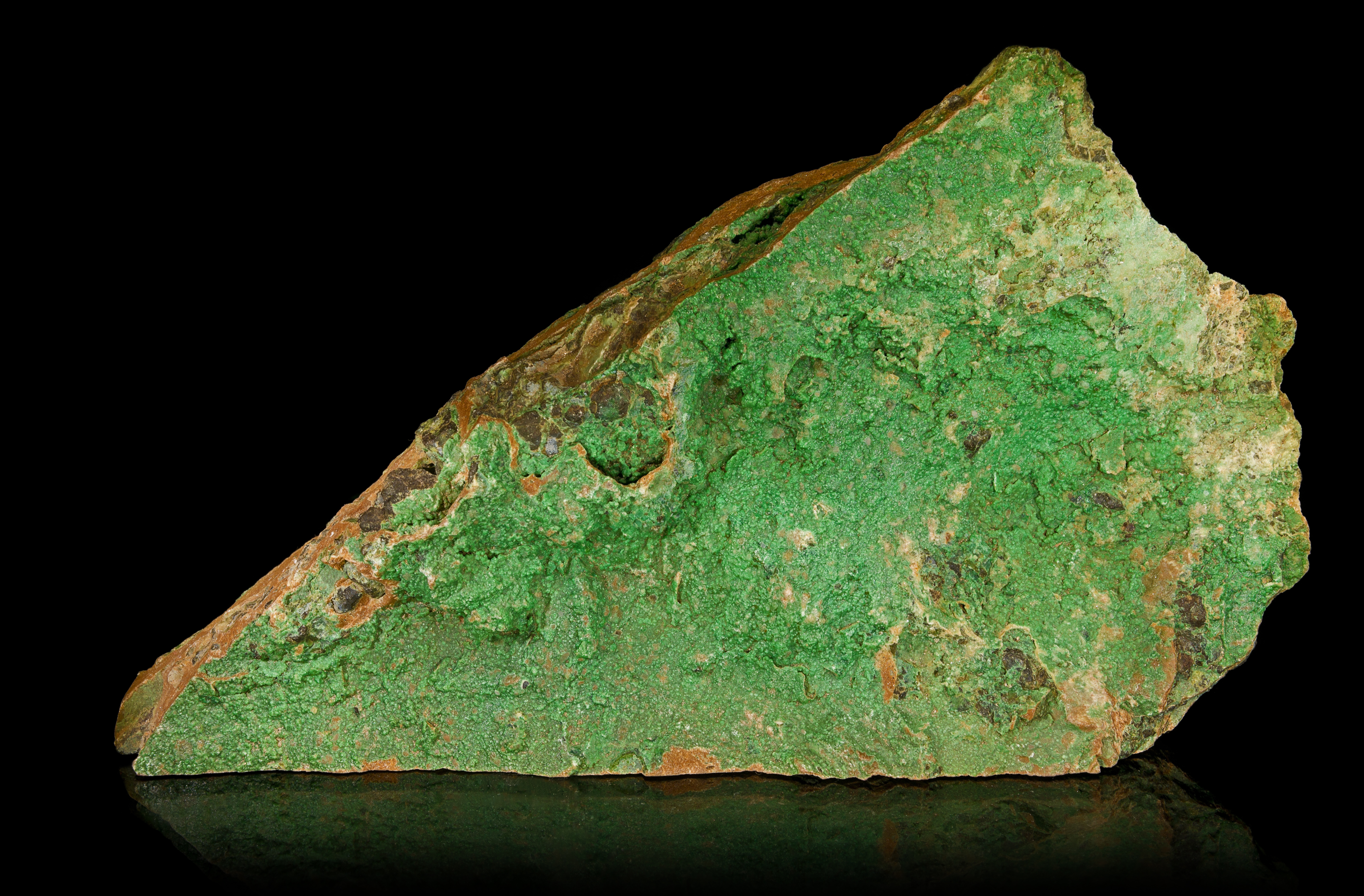
Garniérite, Mine de Camps des sapins, Thio, Province Nord, Nouvelle-Calédonie

Garnier studied at the Saint-Étienne School of Mines (1860). Upon leaving the School of Mines of Saint-Étienne, he worked for two years at the Steelworks of the Navy and the Railways, then carried out a geological study in Sardinia in 1862. He was sent to Nouméa as head of the mines department of New Caledonia in 1863. Until 1866 he traveled the island and discovered a new green nickel ore, having a large weight percent of nickel oxide, which was named garnierite in his honor by his peers. This discovery was formalized at the Paris Academy of Sciences in 1876. He also undertook missions in Canada. He received the Legion of Honor at the age of 28.

In 1876, Jules Garnier filed a patent for the industrial exploitation of New Caledonian nickel and participated in the creation of a company (the future Société Le Nickel - SLN), by having the first nickel plant at Pointe-Chaleix in Nouméa. That same year, he filed a patent in February describing the principles and uses of ferronickel.

In the meantime, as commander of a battalion of volunteers, he took part in the Franco-Prussian War of 1870. He was involved in attacks on bridges, railroads, and so on. He experimented with one of his inventions, torpedoes (50 kg) fueled by flash cotton, with effects as devastating as they were useless in a war lost too quickly. Garnier participated in the defense of Dijon.

He led some reflections on urban transport in the capital, proposing construction of an underground train. Later, he did some research in the field both explosives (experienced during the conflict of 1871) and better use of steam (compound system, steam machine gun).

Several trips to North America and Canada with his son Gilbert Garnier allow him to demonstrate his patents and processes. Since the nickel steel industry is developing, mining companies in Canada work with Jules Garnier because of his reputation. He created entire plants as consulting engineer for the Canadian Copper Company (forerunner of the Inco mining group).

Engineer-inventor, Jules Garnier is also known for the importance and diversity of his writings. Beyond the "simple" publication of research results and/or various projects, Jules Garnier was also a writer. He published many articles in the fields of science and technology, but also in journals of geography. His bibliography consists of more than 30 references, including his travelogues, his reference book "Le Fer" (i.e. "Iron"), and several inventions in various fields. After 1870, he even became secretary of the Geographical Society of Paris.

Jules Garnier died in Gorbio on 8 March 1904. He is buried in the cemetery of Crêt de Roch in Saint-Étienne. Jules Garnier still remains for New Caledonia, a key character in the origin of its industrial development. A school there, and a street in Nouméa bear his name. A species of New Caledonian lizard, Phoboscincus garnieri, is named in his honor.

== Publications and works ==
- Voyage à la Nouvelle-Calédonie, 1867-1868, reéd. 1978, éd. du Cagou,
- Excursion autour de l'île de Tahiti, ed. E. Martinet 1869
- Notes géologiques sur l'Océanie, les îles Tahiti et Rapa Paris, ed. Dunod 1870
- Les Migrations Polynésiennes en Océanie d'après les faits naturels Paris, ed. E. Martinet 1870
- Voyage autour du Monde : OCÉANIE les îles des pins, Loyalty et Tahiti Paris, ed. Plon 1871
- La Lithologie du fond des mers by M. Delesse, Report and Excerpts by M. Jules Garnier, 1872
- Dianémomètre with M. Deprez ed. Imprimerie de J. Desoer, 1872
- Machines à percer, couper et abattre les roches, Emploi de la Nitroglycérine with Ernest Javal St Étienne, ed. Imprimerie de V° Théolier et Co 1891
- L'Or et le Diamant au Transvaal et au Cap, ed. Librairie Polytechnique Baudry et Cie, 1896
