= Goro, New Caledonia =

Coordinates: 22°17′S 167°01′E

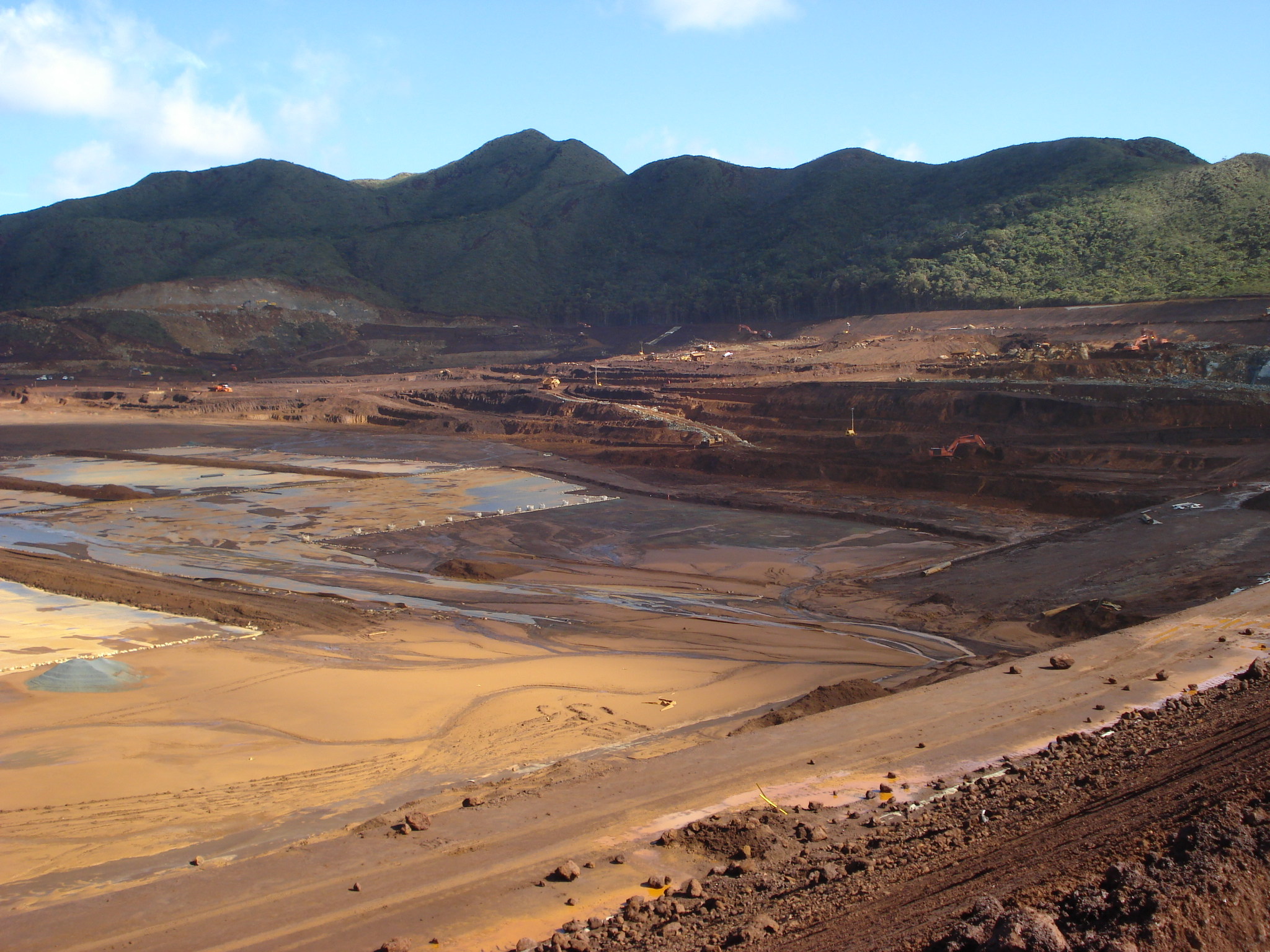
Goro nickel mine

Goro is a major mining settlement in South Province, New Caledonia. The Goro mine is one of the world's biggest nickel mines.

== Climate ==
Goro has a tropical rainforest climate (Köppen climate classification Af). The average annual temperature in Goro is 21.4 °C (70.5 °F). The average annual rainfall is 2,856.4 mm (112.46 in) with March as the wettest month. The temperatures are highest on average in February, at around 24.7 °C (76.5 °F), and lowest in August, at around 18.3 °C (64.9 °F). The highest temperature ever recorded in Goro was 32.1 °C (89.8 °F) on 1 March 2020; the coldest temperature ever recorded was 10.7 °C (51.3 °F) on 4 September 2017.

Climate data for Goro (1991−2020 normals, extremes 2010−present)
Month	Jan	Feb	Mar	Apr	May	Jun	Jul	Aug	Sep	Oct	Nov	Dec	Year
Record high °C (°F)	30.8 (87.4)	31.6 (88.9)	32.1 (89.8)	30.0 (86.0)	28.5 (83.3)	27.3 (81.1)	27.4 (81.3)	26.8 (80.2)	27.2 (81.0)	27.7 (81.9)	30.4 (86.7)	31.9 (89.4)	32.1 (89.8)
Mean daily maximum °C (°F)	27.0 (80.6)	27.2 (81.0)	26.7 (80.1)	25.1 (77.2)	23.4 (74.1)	22.0 (71.6)	21.0 (69.8)	21.3 (70.3)	22.2 (72.0)	23.5 (74.3)	25.0 (77.0)	26.1 (79.0)	24.2 (75.6)
Daily mean °C (°F)	24.1 (75.4)	24.7 (76.5)	24.1 (75.4)	22.7 (72.9)	20.9 (69.6)	19.4 (66.9)	18.3 (64.9)	18.3 (64.9)	19.0 (66.2)	20.5 (68.9)	21.9 (71.4)	23.3 (73.9)	21.4 (70.5)
Mean daily minimum °C (°F)	21.2 (70.2)	22.1 (71.8)	21.6 (70.9)	20.2 (68.4)	18.4 (65.1)	16.9 (62.4)	15.6 (60.1)	15.3 (59.5)	15.8 (60.4)	17.5 (63.5)	18.8 (65.8)	20.4 (68.7)	18.7 (65.7)
Record low °C (°F)	15.6 (60.1)	16.3 (61.3)	17.4 (63.3)	16.2 (61.2)	13.8 (56.8)	12.0 (53.6)	10.9 (51.6)	10.8 (51.4)	10.7 (51.3)	12.6 (54.7)	13.2 (55.8)	15.3 (59.5)	10.7 (51.3)
Average precipitation mm (inches)	364.5 (14.35)	355.6 (14.00)	439.4 (17.30)	287.7 (11.33)	209.9 (8.26)	177.1 (6.97)	216.4 (8.52)	131.2 (5.17)	128.7 (5.07)	118.6 (4.67)	137.5 (5.41)	289.8 (11.41)	2,856.4 (112.46)
Average precipitation days (≥ 1.0 mm)	17.6	19.4	21.6	19.3	17.9	14.9	15.9	11.6	9.6	11.3	10.7	14.7	184.4
Source: Météo-France
