= Raphaël Mapou =

New Caledonian separatist and Kanak politician

Raphaël Mapou (born 9 October 1955 as part of the Unia Tribe in Yaté) is a New Caledonian separatist and Kanak politician. He is the former spokesperson for the Kanak Liberation Party from 1989 to 1998 and was the mayor of Yaté from 1990 to 1995. Mapou was a founding member of the Federation of Pro-Independence Co-operation Committees (FCCI) from 1998 to 2002 and with the FCCI he participated in the second government of New Caledonia that resulted from the Nouméa Accord, chaired by Pierre Frogier, from October 17, 2001, to July 29, 2002. He has been the general secretary of the Comité Rhéébù Nùù since its creation in 2001.

Mapou gained his PhD from the University of New Caledonia in 2018; the title of his thesis was "Dialectical analysis of the transformations of law in New Caledonia: the republican colonial state in the face of Kanak legal institutions" .
