= Rheebu Nuu =

Environmental organization in New Caledonia, France

Rhéébù Nùù
- Purpose: Conservation, environmentalism
- Region served: New Caledonia, France
- Secretary General: Raphaël Mapou (first)

Rhéébù Nùù is an environmental organization on the French territory of New Caledonia; the organization's name means "eye of the land" in the local Djubea language.

== History ==
The group was set up in 2002 with Raphaël Mapou as Secretary General to watch the activities of the Goro Nickel mining company operating on their customary land in the extreme south of Grande Terre, 60 km south of Nouméa. "Rhéébù Nùù’s purpose was not to shut down the mining project entirely, but rather to ensure that the Kanak received the greatest economic benefits for the least environmental cost".

From 2001 to 2008 Rhéébù Nùù pressed Goro Nickel to consult with indigenous communities and for environmental norms to be respected. Serious protests against the project happened in 2006. "This had included several blockades that culminated, in April 2006, in a two-week stand-off in which four gendarmes were injured, 36 people arrested, and over one billion FCFP (approximately $US 13 million) of damage caused to the mining company’s equipment."

Negotiations took place that led to an agreement being signed on 27 September 2008 by 12 Rhéébù Nùù leaders, 25 customary authorities and two Goro Nickel representatives. Called the “Pact for Sustainable Development of the Far South [of New Caledonia]” a corporate foundation was created to fund local development, and a Consultative Customary Environmental Committee (CCCE), an agreement to train local technicians, and to implementing a reforestation program. Rhéébù Nùù agreed in exchange to cease violent actions. Levels of conflict with local people have diminished. However the manner in which this agreement was signed was controversial with many individuals feeling they were not consulted.

Rhéébù Nùù leaders denounced the Pact on 14 July 2009, suspending their agreement. The complaint was acid spills in 2008 and April 2009 that had ruined a freshwater ecosystem. Goro Nickel (now Vale) has also failed to honour its financial commitments. While that opposition has now been dropped, concerns still exist - particularly among green NGOs - about the environmental record of the Goro Nickel plant, even as more local people are now involved in subcontracting operations and work for the company. Rhéébù Nùù lost some of its credibility with the Kanak and with environmental activists in New Caledonia.

There was another acid spill on 21 April 2010.

== 2020s ==
In 2022, the organization's president was André Vama.
