= Arthur René Jean Baptiste Bavay =

French pharmacist, herpetologist and malacologist

Arthur René Jean Baptiste Bavay (29 April 1840 in Lamballe – 1923) was a French pharmacist, herpetologist and malacologist.

== Biography ==
Trained as a naval pharmacist, Bavay's scientific contributions included investigations involving the flora and fauna of New Caledonia, migratory studies of mollusks crossing the Suez Canal and research of the malacological families Pectinidae and Marginellidae. With malacologist Philippe Dautzenberg, he conducted studies of terrestrial and freshwater mollusks of the Far East.

He published nearly 70 articles on mollusks, and after his retirement as a pharmacist, he put his efforts entirely toward malacological research. He is credited with providing descriptions of 39 new species and several infraspecific taxa within the family Marginellidae.

His name is associated with the gecko genus Bavayia, named after Bavay by Jean Roux in 1913, as well as "Bavay's keeled skink" (Tropidophorus baviensis), a species named after Mt. Ba Vi by René Léon Bourret in 1939. Other species that bear his name are: "Bavay's giant gecko" (Rhacodactylus chahoua) and "Bavay's gecko" (Eurydactylodes vieillardi).

== Selected publications ==
- Etude sur deux plantes de la Nouvelle-Calédonie, 1869. [Study on two plants of New Caledonia]. (in French).
- Catalogue des reptiles de la Nouvelle-Calédonie et description d'espèces nouvelles, 1872. [Catalog of reptiles from New Caledonia and the description of new species].
- Note sur l'hylodes martinicensis et ses métamorphoses, 1872. [Notice involving Hylodes martinicensis and its metamorphosis].
- Récolte des mollusques: conseils aux voyageurs, 1895. [Collecting Mollusks: advice for travelers].
- Diagnoses de coquilles nouvelles de l'Indo-Chine, 1900. (with Philippe Dautzenberg). [Diagnoses of new seashells from Indochina].
- Descriptions de quelques nouvelles espèces du Genre Pecten, 1904. [Descriptions of some new species of the genus Pecten ].
- Les lacs des hauts plateaux de l'Amérique du Sud, 1906. (with Maurice Neveu-Lemaire & Edward Asahel Birge). [The lakes of the upper plateaus in South America].
- Mollusques terrestres et fluviatiles récoltés par le Dr Neveu-Lemaire (Mission de Créqui-Montfort et Sénéchal de la Grange en Amérique du Sud), 1904.
- Les lamellibranches de l'expédition du Siboga, 1912. (with Philippe Dautzenberg). [ Lamellibranchs from the Siboga Expedition].
