= Shrink–swell capacity =

The shrink–swell capacity of soils refers to the extent certain clay minerals will expand when wet and retract when dry. Soil with a high shrink–swell capacity is problematic and is known as shrink–swell soil, or expansive soil. The amount of certain clay minerals that are present, such as montmorillonite and smectite, directly affects the shrink-swell capacity of soil. This ability to drastically change volume can cause damage to existing structures, such as cracks in foundations or the walls of swimming pools.

== Description ==
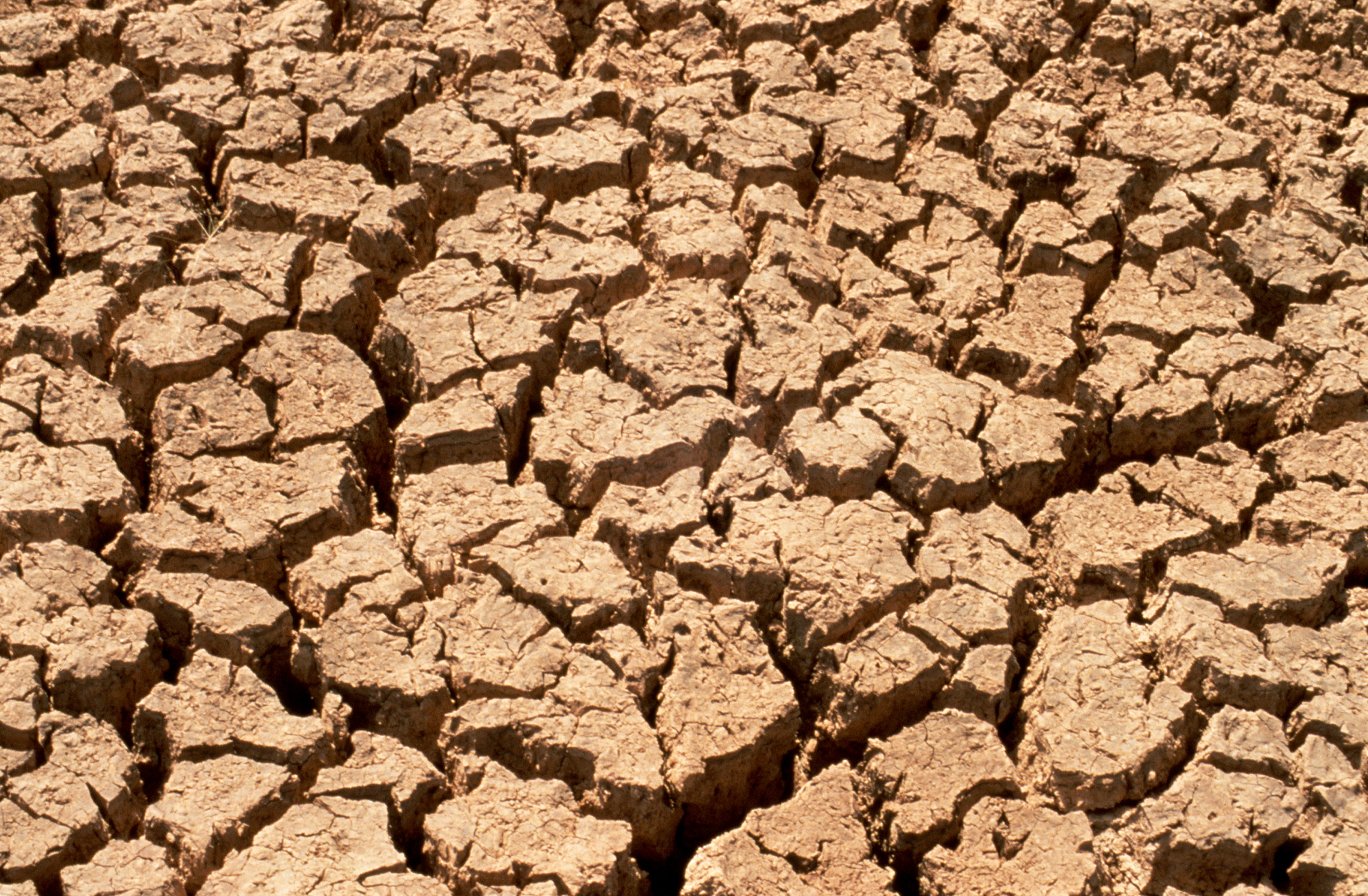
Cracked soil in Australia

Due to the physical and chemical properties of some clays (such as the Lias Group) large swelling occurs when water is absorbed. Conversely when the water dries up these clays contract (shrink). The presence of these clay minerals is what allows soils to have the capacity to shrink and swell. Some of these clay minerals are: smectite, nontronite, bentonite, chlorite, montmorillonite, beidellite, attapulgite, illite and vermiculite. The amount of these minerals in a particular soil will also determine the severity of the shrink-swell capacity. For instance, soils with a small amount of expansive clay minerals will not expand as much when exposed to moisture as a soil with a large amount of the same clay minerals. If a soil is composed of at least 5 percent of these clay minerals by weight, it could have the ability to shrink and swell.

This property is measured using coefficient of linear extensibility (COLE) values. If a soil has a COLE value greater than 0.06, then it can cause structural damage. A COLE value of 0.06 means that 100 inches of soil will expand by 6 inches when wet. Soils with this shrink-swell capacity fall under the soil order of Vertisols. As these soils dry, deep cracks can form on the surface, which then allows water to penetrate to deeper levels of the soil. This can cause the swelling of these soils to become cyclical, with periods of both shrinking and swelling.

== Damage ==
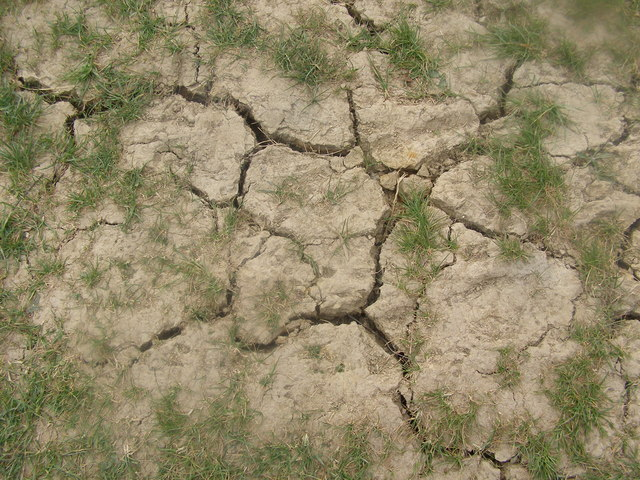
Parched earth in Bourne Woods

Clay groups with a high shrink–swell capacity tend to damage crops during dry spells, as the soil contracts, by pulling roots apart. Soils with shrink-swell capacity can cause engineering problems, or damage to existing structures. The swelling can cause structures to heave or lift, and the shrinking can uneven settling of sediment underneath foundations, potentially causing the structure to fail. Some common structures that sustain soil damage are foundations, walls, driveways, swimming pools, roads, pipelines, and basement floors. Roughly half of the houses in the United States are built on soils that are considered unstable, and half of those will sustain damage from soil. This damage includes large cracks in walls and foundations, buckling of driveways and roads, and jamming of doors and windows.

Shallow pipes, which are buried in the zone of seasonal moisture fluctuation, are put under stress by shrinking soils, which can cause breakage of water or sewage pipes. Swimming pool shells can crack due to this pressure as well, and leaky pools can also introduce a lot of water into the surrounding soils over time, which could end up lifting pool decks and nearby foundations. Annually, there is an estimated $7 billion in damage caused by clay shrink-swell soils. All this damage is caused by the force exerted by expanding soil, or ground heave.

Expansive soils are the most problematic in regions with very defined wet and dry periods, as opposed to areas that maintain a certain level of moisture throughout the year, as this annual cycle causes the soils to expand and swell every year. Water can also be introduced into the soil through people, or their infrastructure. Damage is quite often caused by differential swelling which is caused by pockets of wet soil situated right next to dry soil. Examples of localized water sources include sprinkler systems, cesspools, leaky pipes, and swimming pools.

== Identification ==
Property owners and prospective buyers may check for expansive soils by consulting a soil survey, many of which are created and maintained by the United States Department of Agriculture-Natural Resource Conservation Service (USDA-NRCS). A soil survey should list the coefficient of linear extensibility (COLE) value. Professional soil scientists can also analyze samples of a soil to determine its shrink-swell capacity. Expansive soils will form large cracks, in roughly polygonal shapes, on the surface of the soil during dry periods. However, lack of these cracks does not mean a soil is not expansive.

== Mitigation ==
Many methods may be employed to mitigate or prevent the damage caused by expansive soils. When it comes to foundations, one solution is to extend building foundations to a depth where they are below the zone of water content fluctuation. This supports them when the soil shrinks, and anchors them when the soil swells. Another solution is to remove the pre-existing expansive soil and replace it with a non-expansive soil, but if the depth of the expansive soil is too deep, this option is very expensive. Maintaining a constant soil moisture is another solution, which sometimes may be achieved by allowing rainwater to properly drain away from the property, fixing areas around structures that have poor drainage qualities, fixing pipe leaks, avoiding over-watering nearby plants, and by planting trees some distance away from any structure. Yet another solution is a process called soil stabilization, in which additional materials are added to the soil to limit its ability to shrink and swell. Materials for stabilization include cement, resins, fly ash, lime, pozzolana, or lime-pozzolana mixture, depending on the site conditions and the project goals.

== See also ==
- Argillipedoturbation
