= Pierre Berthier =

French geologist and mining engineer (1782-1861)

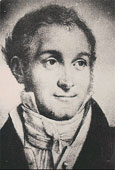
- Pierre Berthier
- Born: 3 July 1782
- Died: 24 August 1861 (aged 79)
- Education: École Polytechnique
- Known for: Bauxite, nontronite and berthierite
- Scientific career
- Fields: Geology
- Workplaces: École des Mines

Pierre Berthier (French pronunciation: [pjɛʁ bɛʁtje]; 3 July 1782, Nemours, Seine-et-Marne – 24 August 1861) was a French geologist and mining engineer.

Pierre Berthier was born in Nemours. After studying at the École Polytechnique, he went to the École des Mines, where he became chief of the laboratory in 1816. In 1821, while working in the village of Les Baux-de-Provence, in southern France, he discovered the rock bauxite, named for the place of its discovery.

In 1827, Pierre Berthier also named the clay mineral nontronite (Fe(III)-rich end-member of the smectite group) from the town of Nontron in the Dordogne department in Nouvelle-Aquitaine in southwestern France, near its type locality.

He also discovered the mineral berthierite, which was named after him. In addition to numerous contributions in mineralogy and mining, Berthier is also noted for his research into blast furnaces and for the utilization of phosphates by plants.

He was paralyzed by an accident in 1858.

The detailed register of homosexuals, then maintained by the Paris police prefecture, mention him as a lover of soldiers.

== Awards ==
Pierre Berthier was elected a member of the Académie des Sciences in 1825. In 1828, he became a chevalier of the Legion of Honor. His name is one of the 72 names inscribed on the Eiffel Tower.
