= Montmorillonite =

Phyllosilicate minerals in the smectite group

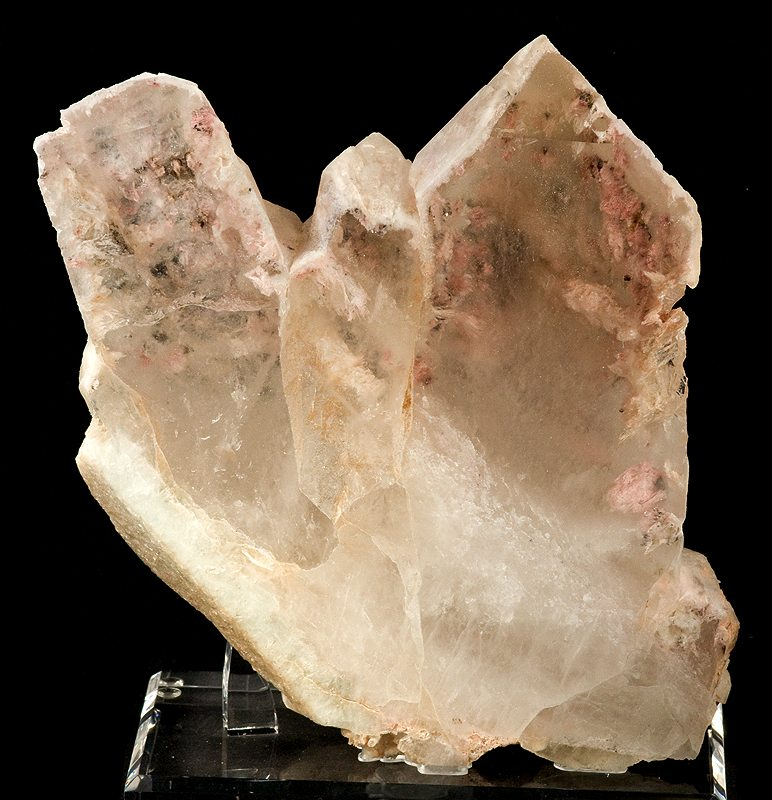
- A sample of montmorillonite

General
- Category: Phyllosilicate minerals
- Group: Smectite group
- Formula: (Na,Ca)_{0.33}(Al,Mg)_{2}(Si_{4}O_{10})(OH)_{2}·nH_{2}O
- IMA symbol: Mnt
- Crystal system: Monoclinic
- Crystal class: Prismatic (2/m) (same H-M symbol)
- Space group: C2/m
- Unit cell: a = 5.19 Å, b = 9.02 Å, c = 12.4 Å; β = 94°; Z = 2

Identification
- Color: White, pale pink, blue, yellow, red, green
- Crystal habit: Compact masses of lamellar or globular microcrystalline aggregates
- Cleavage: {001} Perfect
- Fracture: Uneven
- Mohs scale hardness: 1–2
- Luster: Dull, earthy
- Diaphaneity: Translucent
- Specific gravity: 2–3
- Optical properties: Biaxial (−)
- Refractive index: n_{α} = 1.485–1.535 n_{β} = 1.504–1.550 n_{γ} = 1.505–1.550
- Birefringence: δ = 0.020
- 2V angle: Measured: 5° to 30°

Montmorillonite is a very soft phyllosilicate group of minerals that form when they precipitate from water solution as microscopic crystals, known as clay. It is named after Montmorillon in France. Montmorillonite, a member of the smectite group, is a 2:1 clay, meaning that it has two tetrahedral sheets of silica sandwiching a central octahedral sheet of alumina. The particles are plate-shaped with an average diameter around 1 μm and a thickness of 0.96 nm; magnification of about 25,000 times, using an electron microscope, is required to resolve individual clay particles. Members of this group include saponite, nontronite, beidellite, and hectorite.

Montmorillonite is a subclass of smectite, a 2:1 phyllosilicate mineral characterized as having greater than 50% octahedral charge; its cation exchange capacity is due to isomorphous substitution of Mg for Al in the central alumina plane. The substitution of lower valence cations in such instances leaves the nearby oxygen atoms with a net negative charge that can attract cations. In contrast, beidellite is smectite with greater than 50% tetrahedral charge originating from isomorphous substitution of Al for Si in the silica sheet.

The individual crystals of montmorillonite clay are not tightly bound hence water can intervene, causing the clay to swell, hence montmorillonite is a characteristic component of swelling soil. The water content of montmorillonite is variable and it increases greatly in volume when it absorbs water. Chemically, it is hydrated sodium calcium aluminium magnesium silicate hydroxide (Na,Ca)_{0.33}(Al,Mg)_{2}(Si_{4}O_{10})(OH)_{2}·nH_{2}O. Potassium, iron, and other cations are common substitutes, and the exact ratio of cations varies with source. It often occurs intermixed with chlorite, muscovite, illite, cookeite, and kaolinite.

== Cave conditions ==
Montmorillonite can be concentrated and transformed within cave environments. The natural weathering of the cave can leave behind concentrations of aluminosilicates which were contained within the bedrock. Montmorillonite can form slowly in solutions of aluminosilicates. High HCO^{−}_{3} concentrations and long periods of time can aid in its formation. Montmorillonite can then transform to palygorskite under dry conditions and to halloysite-10Å (endellite) in acidic conditions (pH 5 or lower). Halloysite-10Å can further transform into halloysite-7Å by drying.

== Uses ==
Structure of montmorillonite

Montmorillonite is used in the oil drilling industry as a component of drilling mud, making the mud slurry viscous, which helps to keep the drill bit cool, and to remove drilled solids. It is also used as a soil additive to hold soil water in drought-prone soils, used in the construction of earthen dams and levees, and to prevent the leakage of fluids. It is also used as a component of foundry sand and as a desiccant to remove moisture from air and gases.

Montmorillonite clays have been extensively used in catalytic processes. Cracking catalysts have used montmorillonite clays for over 60 years. Other acid-based catalysts use acid-treated montmorillonite clays.

Similar to many other clays, montmorillonite swells with the addition of water. Montmorillonites expand considerably more than other clays due to water penetrating the interlayer molecular spaces and concomitant adsorption. The amount of expansion is due largely to the type of exchangeable cation contained in the sample. The presence of sodium as the predominant exchangeable cation can result in the clay swelling to several times its original volume. Hence, sodium montmorillonite has come to be used as the major constituent in nonexplosive agents for splitting rock in natural stone quarries in an effort to limit the amount of waste, or for the demolition of concrete structures where the use of explosive charges is unacceptable.

This swelling property makes montmorillonite-containing bentonite useful also as an annular seal or plug for water wells and as a protective liner for landfills. Other uses include as an anticaking agent in animal feed, in papermaking to minimize deposit formation, and as a retention and drainage aid component. Montmorillonite has also been used in cosmetics.

Sodium montmorillonite is also used as the base of some cat litter products, due to its adsorbent and clumping properties.

Montmorillonite can be used to remove arsenic from wastewater.

=== Calcined clay products ===
Montmorillonite can be calcined to produce arcillite, a porous material. This calcined clay is sold as a soil conditioner for playing fields and other soil products such as for use as bonsai soil as an alternative to akadama.

=== Medicine and pharmacology ===
Montmorillonite is effective as an adsorptive of heavy metals, however the impact this has on human health is unknown.

For external use, montmorillonite has been used to treat contact dermatitis.

=== Pet food ===
Montmorillonite clay is added to some dog and cat foods as an anti-caking agent and because it may provide some resistance to environmental toxins, though research on the subject is not yet conclusive.

In a fine powder form, it can also be used as a flocculant in ponds. Tossed on the surface as it drops into the water, making the water "clouded", it attracts minute particles in the water and then settles to the bottom, cleaning the water. Koi and goldfish (carp) then actually feed on the "clump" which can aid in the digestion of the fish. It is sold in pond supply shops.

== Discovery ==
Montmorillonite was first described in 1847 for an occurrence in Montmorillon in the department of Vienne, France, more than 50 years before the discovery of bentonite in the US. It is found in many locations worldwide and known by other names. Recently, a new source of Montmorillonite has been explored in Sulaiman Mountains of Pakistan.

== See also ==
- Dispersion (soil)
- Emulsion dispersion – Thermoplastics or elastomers suspended in a liquid state by means of emulsifiers
- Sodification – Salt content in the soil
