= Canal lining =

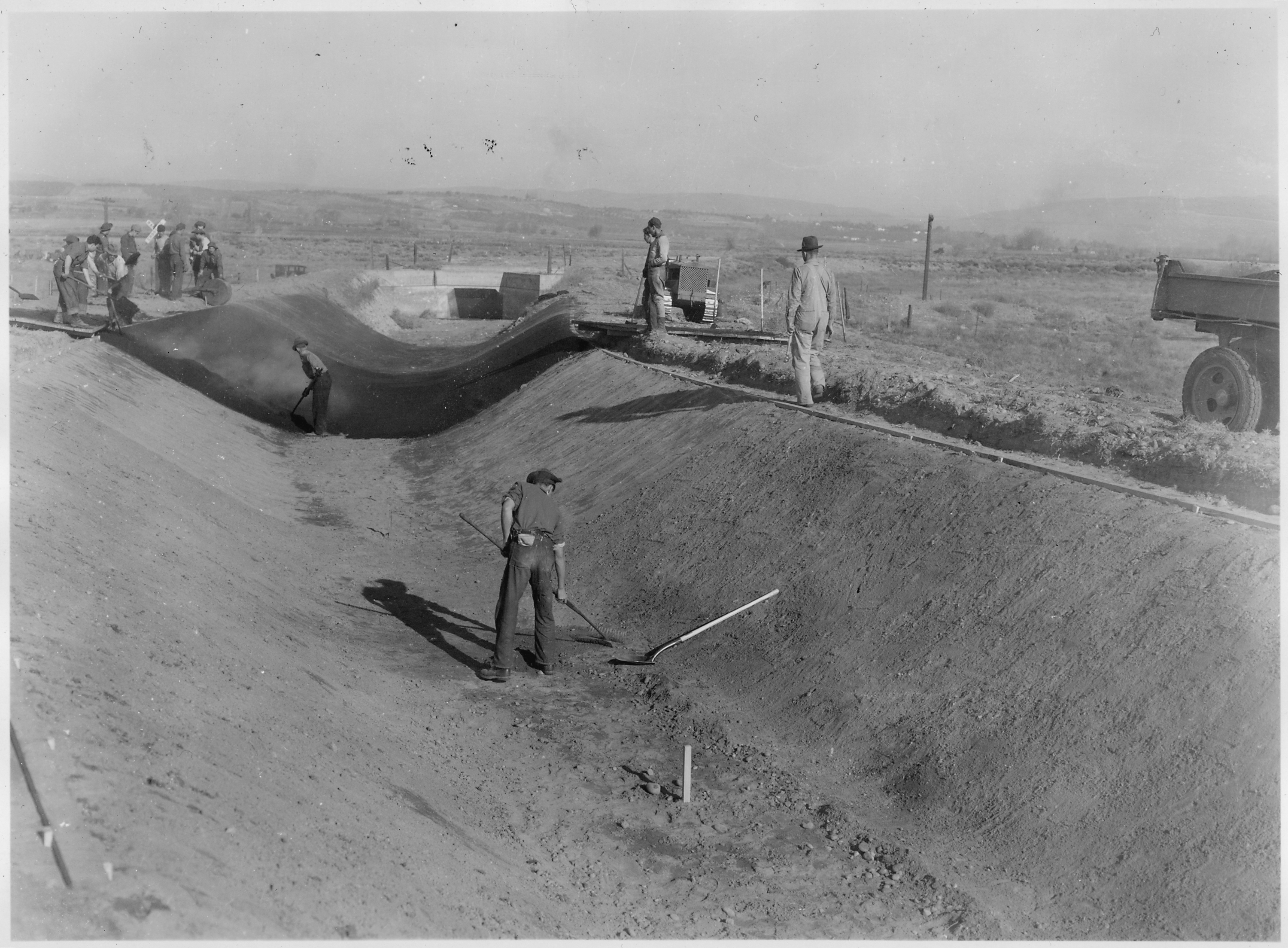
Canal Lining

Canal lining is the process of reducing seepage loss of irrigation water by adding an impermeable layer to the edges of the trench. Seepage can result in losses of 30 to 50 percent of irrigation water from canals, so adding lining can make irrigation systems more efficient. Canal linings are also used to prevent weed growth, which can spread throughout an irrigation system and reduce water flow. Lining a canal can also prevent waterlogging around low-lying areas of the canal.

By making a canal less permeable, the water velocity increases resulting in a greater overall discharge. Increased velocity also reduces the amount of evaporation and silting that occurs, making the canal more efficient. The oldest known paved canal was discovered in 1995 near the pyramids of Giza, and is estimated to be around 4,500 years old.

== Canal lining types ==
=== Concrete ===
Concrete canal lining is often used due to its high structural strength and longevity. Concrete used for canal lining is typically non-reinforced, as a way to reduce cost. A common method for constructing concrete lining is the use of slip forms, which are drawn down the length of the canal as the concrete is poured. Hand laying of concrete or prefabricated sections are also used when only a short distance needs to be covered. Certain additives, such as kankar lime and surkhi, are sometimes included in the concrete mixture to improve water retention.

Prior to constructing concrete linings, it is common practice to ensure the sub-grade layer of soil is adequately consolidated. If expansive clay is located on the site of a canal, a layer of this clay is removed and replaced with sand or gravel before the concrete lining is constructed. This removal minimizes the risk of ground swelling, which can cause cracking in the concrete. In order to prevent cracking during the curing process, water is sprinkled on the concrete or a damp cover is placed over the lining. Another preventive measure against cracking, includes adding transverse and longitudinal grooves or expansion joints which help absorb cracking that may occur.

=== Compacted soil ===
Compacted clay is a simple form of soil canal lining, which serves as a relatively cheap alternative to other methods. Certain clays, such as bentonite, have high water absorption but then become impervious, which makes them an ideal soil lining. It has been shown through studies done in the U.S., that a layer of bentonite 2 to 5 cm thick, underneath a layer of earth 15 to 30 cm thick, makes for an adequate lining system. Typically, porous soils are removed before compacted clay is applied to the bed and sides of a canal.

Another simple method of canal lining with soils entails applying a layer of compacted silt on top of the subgrade of the canal. The use of soils as canal linings is efficient for controlling seepage, but not effective against weed growth.

=== Plastic membrane ===
Plastic linings are often referred to as geomembranes or flexible membrane linings. Plastic linings are often covered with soil, rocks, brick, concrete or other material. This is done in order to anchor the lining down and to protect it from deterioration and disintegration. Plastic membranes are very thin, varying in thickness from 8 up to 100 thousandths of an inch. Low-density polyethylene (LDPE) film, similar to the material used in trash bags, is a common type of plastic membrane used. Plastic linings are also used as a method of retrofitting damaged concrete linings.

== Potential damage to canal linings ==
Since canal linings are exposed to the elements and are in constant use, they are susceptible to damage over time. Geotechnical considerations are often ignored in designing canal linings due to the light weight of the structure. Concrete canal linings often experience cracking, which can be expensive to repair. Cracking can occur through several ways, starting during construction if the concrete is cured improperly. Cracking can also occur due to movement of the soil, which can be caused by frost heave or the swelling of expansive soils. Expansive soils, such as certain types of clay, may swell as a result of canal discharge, changing climates or transpiration. A common method to reduce future swelling in expansive soils is to subject the soil to wetting and drying cycles prior to construction of the lining. Lab testing has shown that subjecting a clayey soil to wetting and drying cycles leads to a hysteresis of shrinkage in the soil, significantly reducing its free swelling potential. Dispersive soils, such as fine graded sands, can also pose a threat to concrete canal linings since they erode when in contact with flowing water, which can cause piping. As a way to reduce the potential for this contact to occur, geomembrane sheets can be installed underneath concrete linings, thus reducing the amount of water that may seep through the canal.
