= Dickite =

Phyllosilicate mineral in the kaolinite subgroup

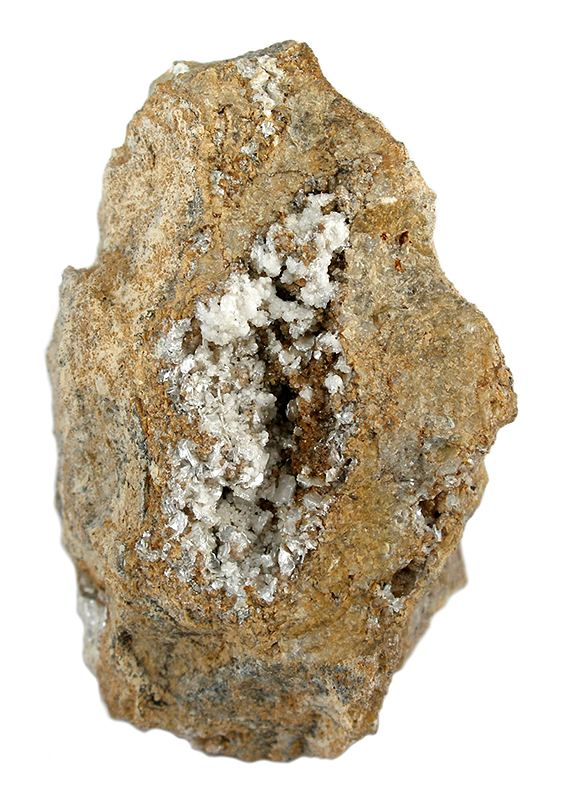

General
- Category: Phyllosilicate minerals
- Group: Kaolinite-Serpentine group, kaolinite subgroup
- Formula: Al_{2}Si_{2}O_{5}(OH)_{4}
- IMA symbol: Dck
- Strunz classification: 9.ED.05
- Dana classification: 71.01.01.01
- Crystal system: Monoclinic
- Crystal class: Domatic (m) (same H-M symbol)
- Space group: Cc
- Unit cell: a = 5.150, b = 8.940 c = 14.424 [Å]; β = 96.8°; Z = 4

Identification
- Color: White, with coloration from impurities
- Crystal habit: Pseudohexagonal crystals, aggregates of platelets and compact massive
- Cleavage: Perfect on {001}
- Tenacity: Flexible but inelastic
- Mohs scale hardness: 1.5–2
- Luster: Satiny to pearly
- Streak: White
- Diaphaneity: Transparent
- Specific gravity: 2.6
- Optical properties: Biaxial (+)
- Refractive index: n_{α} = 1.561 – 1.564 n_{β} = 1.561 – 1.566 n_{γ} = 1.566 – 1.570
- Birefringence: δ = 0.005 – 0.006
- 2V angle: Measured: 50° to 80°

Dickite (Al_{2}Si_{2}O_{5}(OH)_{4}) is a phyllosilicate clay mineral named after the metallurgical chemist Allan Brugh Dick, who first described it. It is chemically composed of 20.90% aluminium, 21.76% silicon, 1.56% hydrogen and 55.78% oxygen. It has the same composition as kaolinite, nacrite, and halloysite, but with a different crystal structure (polymorph). Dickite sometimes contains impurities such as titanium, iron, magnesium, calcium, sodium and potassium.

Dickite occurs with other clays and requires x-ray diffraction for its positive identification. Dickite is an important alteration indicator in hydrothermal systems as well as occurring in soils and shales.

Dickite's type location is in Pant-y-Gaseg, Amlwch, Isle of Anglesey, Wales, United Kingdom, where it was first described in 1888. Dickite appears in locations with similar qualities and is found in China, Jamaica, France, Germany, United Kingdom, United States, Italy, Belgium and Canada.

== History ==
In 1888, Allan Brugh Dick (1833–1926), a Scottish metallurgical chemist, was on the island of Anglesey to conduct research on kaolin. He performed various experiments describing the clay mineral. It was not until 1931 that Clarence S. Ross and Paul F. Kerr looked closer at the mineral and concluded that it was different from the known minerals of kaolinite and nacrite. They named it after the first person to describe the mineral.

== Composition ==
Al_{2}Si_{2}O_{5}(OH)_{4} is the chemical formula of dickite. The calculated percent abundances are very close when compared to other kaolin minerals.

Chemical composition of dickite:

- SiO_{2} 46.54%
- Al_{2}O_{3} 39.50%
- H_{2}O 13.96%

Dickite and other kaolin minerals are commonly developed by weathering of feldspars and muscovite. Through its evolution, dickite, a phyllosilicate mineral, maintains the aluminium and silicon elements influencing the formation of hexagonal sheets common to clay minerals.

The problem of mistaken identity arises when comparing dickite to other kaolin minerals due to the fact that kaolinite, dickite, and nacrite all have the same formula but different molecular structures. The only way to determine the true identity of the mineral is through powder x-ray diffraction and optical means.

== Geologic occurrence ==
Dickite was first discovered in Almwch, Island of Anglesey, Wales, UK. Dickite is scattered across Wales forming occurrences in vein assemblages and as a rock-forming mineral. This area and others where dickite can be found all share similar characteristics. Pockets in phylloid algal limestones, in interstices of biocalcarenites and sandstone are a suitable environment for dickite. Very low pressure and high temperatures are the ideal environment for the formation of dickite. The more perfected crystallization of dickite occurs in porous algal limestones in the form of a white powder. The more disordered dickites can be found in less porous rocks.

Another occurrence spot, as indicated by Brindley and Porter of the American Mineralogists journal, is the Northerly dickite-bearing zone in Jamaica. The dickite in this zone ranges from indurate breccias containing cream to pinkish and purplish fragments composed largely of dickite with subordinate anatase set in a matrix of greenish dickite, to discrete veins and surface coatings of white, cream and translucent dickite. It appears that dickite in the northerly zone were formed by hot ascending waters from an uncertain origin.

Dickite is found worldwide in locations such as Ouray, Colorado, US; San Juanito, Chihuahua, Mexico, in a silicified zone among the rhyolite area; and in St. George, Utah, US, where the mineral is thought to be associated with volcanic rock. An extensive study was done on dickite pertaining to its location in Pennsylvanian limestones of southeastern Kansas, US.

In the dickite deposits of southeast Kansas the distribution is dependent on the following: the stratigraphic alternation of limestones and shales, westward regional dip, thick deposits of highly porous algal limestones, and igneous intrusions. It was found that groundwaters substantially heated along with magmatic waters which made its way up-dip and through the intrusions in the conduit-like algal mounds which allowed the dickite to be deposited in this area and it might be conclusive to say that this trend follows elsewhere in other locations around the world.

== Physical properties ==
Dickite takes on the appearance of a white, brown earthy color and is often found embedded in many other minerals such as quartz.

Dickite has perfect cleavage in the (001) direction. Its color varies from blue, gray, white to colorless. It usually has a dull clay-like texture. Its hardness on the Mohs scale is 1.5–2, basically between talc and gypsum. This is attributed to its loose chemical bonds. It is held with hydrogen bonds, which are otherwise weak. It leaves a white streak and it has a pearly luster. It has a density of 2.6. Dickite is biaxial, its birefringence is between 0.0050–0.0090, its surface relief is low and it has no dispersion. The plane of the optical axis is normal to the plane of symmetry and inclined 160, rear to the normal to (0,0,1).

The atomic structure of dickite, being very similar to that of kaolinite and other kaolin type minerals, has a very specific arrangement that differs slightly enough to set its physical appearance and other physical properties apart from that of its family members kaolinite and nacrite. In a comparison of the family of minerals through experiments examined by Ross and Kerr the similarities between them are clearly evident and can, depending on the samples, be indistinguishable by optical means.

The hexagonal structure and the stacking of the atoms influence the physical properties in many ways including the color, hardness, cleavage, density, and luster. Another important factor in influencing physical properties of minerals is the presence of bonding between atoms. Within dickite there exists dominant O-H bonding, a type of strong ionic bonding.

== Structure ==
Dickite has a monoclinic crystal system and its crystal class is domatic (m). This crystal system contains two non-equal axes (a and b) that are perpendicular to each other and a third axis (c) that is inclined with respect to the a axis. The a and c axes lie in a plane. Dickite involves an interlayer bonding with at least 3 identifiable bonds: an ionic type interaction due to net unbalanced charges on the layers, Van der Waals forces between layers and hydrogen bonds between oxygen atoms on the surface of one layer and hydroxyl groups on the opposing surface. A hydrogen bond, as the term is used here, involves a long range interaction between hydrogen of a hydroxyl group coordinated to a cation and an oxygen atom coordinated to another cation. The reaction is predominantly electrostatic; hence an ionic bonding model is appropriate. Its axial ratio is a=0.576, b=1, c=1.6135.

The hexagonal network of Si-O tetrahedra along with the superimposed layer of Al-O, OH octahedra make up the kaolin layer found in dickite. Dickite is composed of regular sequences of one, two and six kaolin layers. Analysis of the dickite structure reveals the space group to be C4s-Cc. The a and c axis both lie on the glide plane of symmetry. Dickite's structure is made up of a shared layer of corner-sharing tetrahedra filled by a plane of oxygens and hydroxyls along with a sheet of edge-sharing octahedra with every third site left empty.

An experiment was conducted using a pseudo-hexagonal crystal of dickite to determine the unit cell information and the layers that exist within dickite. It was found that there are six layers within the kaolin layer within dickite. This is evidenced in the following findings. There is an oxygen atom from the all oxygen layer that lies at the center. The atoms of the O layer, the Si layer and the O, (OH) layer are situated for the ideal kaolin layer.

X-ray experiments were performed by C. J. Ksanda and Tom F. W. Barth and it was concluded that dickite is composed of tiny layers of cations and anions which are parallel to the a-b plane stacked on top of one another which they found to be exactly as Gruner had described. It was also concluded that the two dimensional arrangement of some of the atoms are not as Gruner described.
