= Emulsion dispersion =

Thermoplastics or elastomers suspended in a liquid state by means of emulsifiers

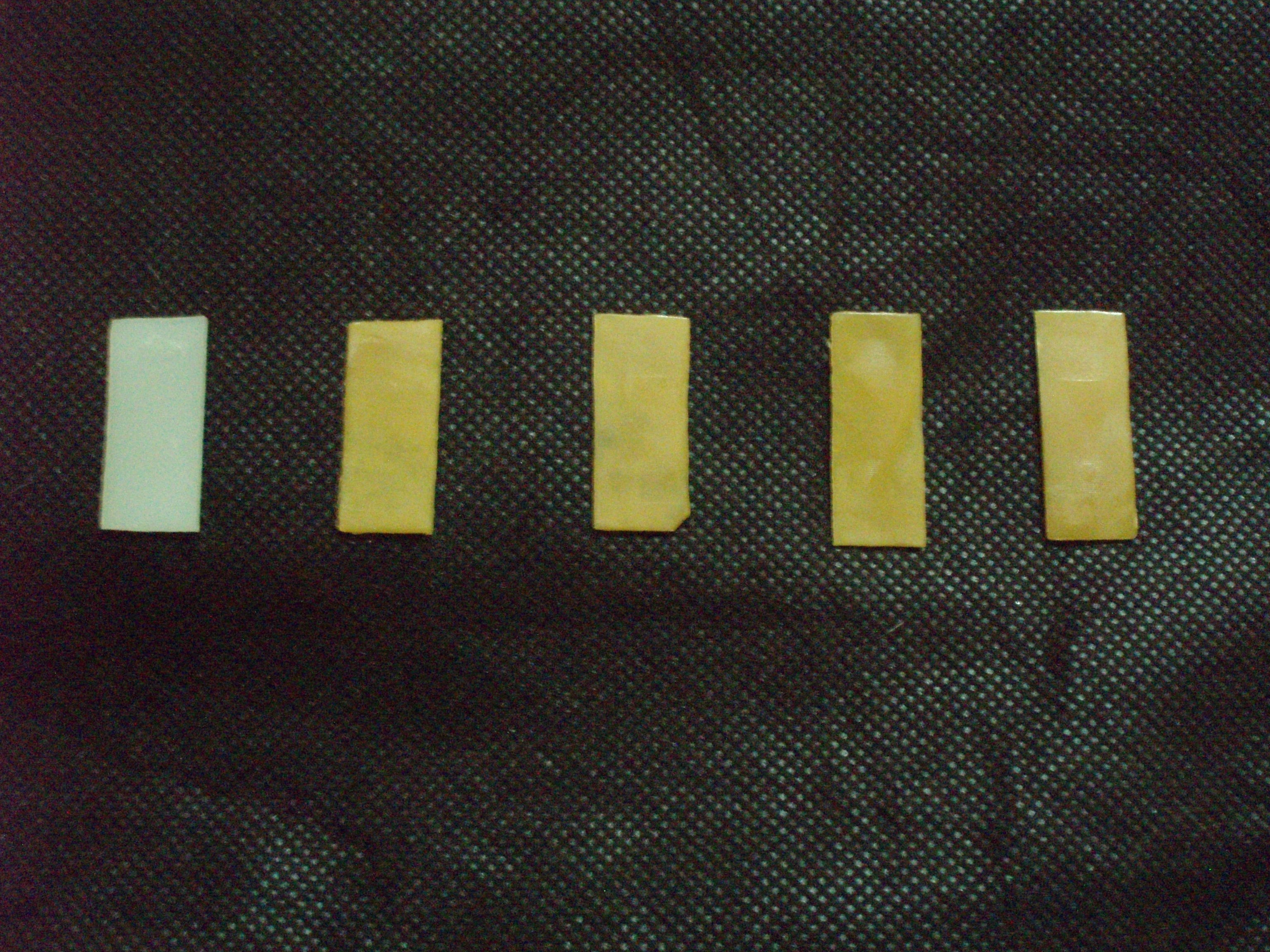
Pristine nylon-6 (white) and nylon-6/LNR blends (yellow) films, prepared via emulsion dispersion technique.

An emulsion dispersion is thermoplastics or elastomers suspended in a liquid state by means of emulsifiers.

== Preparation ==
Emulsions are thermodynamically unstable liquid/liquid dispersions that are stabilized. Emulsion dispersion is not about reactor blends for which one polymer is polymerized from its monomer in the presence of the other polymers; emulsion dispersion is a novel method of choice for the preparation of homogeneous blends of thermoplastic and elastomer. In emulsion dispersion system the preparation of well-fined polymers droplets may be acquired by the use of water as dispersing medium. The surfactant molecules adsorb on the surface of emulsion by creating a dispersion of droplets, which reduces interfacial tension and retards particle flocculation during mixing. The molecules of surfactant have polar and non-polar parts which act as an intermediary to combine polar and non-polar polymers; the intermolecular interactions between the polar and the non-polar polymer segments resemble the macroscopic hydrocarbon-water interface. The idea of the emulsion dispersion inspired by emulsification of liquid natural rubber (LNR), from particle size analysis and optical microscopy results showed that the droplet size of emulsion of LNR with higher molecular weight is greater than that of the lower molecular weight. Emulsion dispersion was able to produce homogeneous low-density polyethylene (LDPE)/LNR blends and nylon 6/LNR blends. Results of differential scanning calorimetry (DSC) thermogram indicated a single glass transition temperature (Tg) showed that the blends were compatible and scanning electron microscopy (SEM) micrograph showed no phase separation between blend components. In addition, exfoliated HDPE/LNR/montmorillonite nanocomposites were successfully achieved by using emulsion dispersion technique as well.
