= Expansive clay =

Clay soil prone to swelling and shrinking

Expansive clay, also called expansive soil, is a clay soil prone to large volume changes (swelling and shrinking) directly related to changes in water content. Soils with a high content of expansive minerals can form deep cracks in drier seasons or years; such soils are called vertisols. Soils with smectite clay minerals, including montmorillonite, kaolinite, and illite group minerals, such as montmorillonite-containing bentonite, have the most dramatic shrink–swell capacity.

The mineral make-up of this type of soil is responsible for the moisture retaining capabilities. All clays consist of mineral sheets packaged into layers, and can be classified as either 1:1 or 2:1. These ratios refer to the proportion of tetrahedral sheets to octahedral sheets. Octahedral sheets are sandwiched between two tetrahedral sheets in 2:1 clays, while 1:1 clays have sheets in matched pairs. Expansive clays have an expanding crystal lattice in a 2:1 ratio; however, there are 2:1 non-expansive clays.

== Identification of expansive clay ==
To confirm the presence of expansive clay soils, geotechnical engineers may perform laboratory testing techniques to assess shrink-swell potential. Atterberg limits measure the plasticity index (PI) and liquid limit (LL) to determine soil behavior, where PI over 35 indicates high expansion potential, and LL over 50 suggests significant swelling characteristics.

A free swell test measures the free swell index (FSI) by comparing the volume of dry soil in water to its volume in kerosene. A mineralogical analysis is an X-ray diffraction (XRD) test that can identify specific clay minerals, such as montmorillonite, which would indicate shrink-swell qualities of the soil.

Field assessment for expansive soil may also be conducted, including a visual inspection to identify surface characteristics such as gilgai topography (alternating mounds and depressions) and deep shrinkage cracks. Another field assessment is a simple hand test that involves rolling moistened soil into a thread. If the thread can be rolled to a diameter of 3 mm without crumbling, the soil likely contains a measurable amount of clay content, indicating some expansiveness.

== Risk assessment ==
Identification criteria for soil expansion based on oedometer swell potential values:

Degree of Expansion	Colloid Content (%)	Plasticity Index (%)	Shrinkage Index (%)	Expansion in Oedometer as per Holts and Gibbs (%)
Low	<17	< 18	<15	<10
Medium	12-27	15-28	15-30	10-20
High	18-37	25-41	30-60	20-30
Very High	>27	> 35	>60	>30

== Managing expansive soils ==
Managing the effects of expansive clay on structures built in affected areas is an important consideration in geotechnical and structural engineering. Several techniques are used across the construction sector, depending on environment, cost, and schedule limitations.

=== Structural engineering ===
Structural solutions are engineered designs integrated and implemented during the foundation phase of construction. Structural design elements mitigate soils from the upward or adjacent pressures of swelling soils through physical means.

One or more techniques may be employed to manage expansive soil effects. These include designs that call for digging deep foundations or installing pile systems extending beyond affected soil depths and reinforced slab-on-grade construction with underlying crossbeams.

Void spaces beneath foundations, created with void forms, provide empty spaces for swelling soil to move into, insulating the foundation from the impact caused by this pressure. Void forms come in various materials and formats, including degradable (paper, carton forms) and non-degradable (collapsible plastic, EPS foam), designed to work under structural concrete slabs, piers, and beams.

=== Chemical stabilization ===
Chemical stabilizers are specialized compounds that modify soil properties to create a more stable foundation for built-in expansive soil conditions. They work by altering the soil's chemical composition and physical characteristics through biological, physical, and chemical additions.

Common chemical expansive clay treatments include lime, portland cement, fly ash, and polymer-based additives. More recently, chemical injection (potassium, acid, or acid-oil) has been introduced as a more cost-effective means of minimizing the expansiveness of clay soils, namely by altering the clay's molecular structure and reducing the soils Ionic Exchange Rate with water.

=== Moisture control ===
Moisture control manages the swelling potential of expansive soils through preventative measures designed to redirect environmental water sources and maintain a consistent moisture equilibrium beneath and around structures.

Strategies may include drainage systems and grading for surface water management, using sump pumps, impermeable vertical moisture barriers, and landscaping designs incorporating vegetation, moisture-regulating ground cover, and/or buffer zones around the structure.

== See also ==
- Argillipedoturbation
- Dispersion (soil)
