= Hectorite =

Phyllosilicate mineral in the smectite group

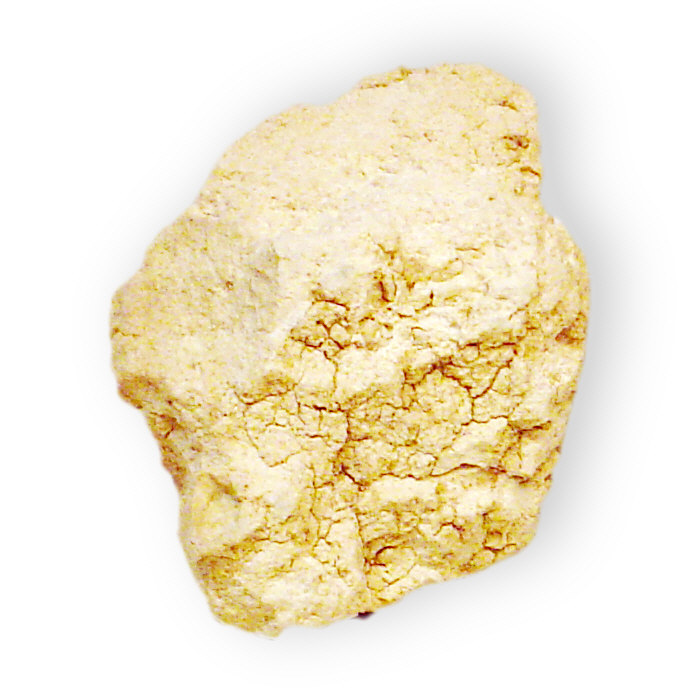
- Hectorite from California

General
- Category: Phyllosilicate minerals
- Group: Smectite group
- Formula: Na_{0.3}(Mg,Li)_{3}Si_{4}O_{10}(OH)_{2} (empirical: Na_{3}(Mg,Li)_{30}Si_{40}O_{100}(OH)_{20})
- IMA symbol: Htr
- Strunz classification: 9.EC.45
- Crystal system: Monoclinic
- Crystal class: Prismatic (2/m) (same H-M symbol)
- Space group: C2/m
- Unit cell: a = 5.25 Å, b = 9.18 Å c = 16 Å; β = 99°; Z = 2

Identification
- Color: White, cream, pale brown, mottled
- Crystal habit: Thin laths and aggregates
- Cleavage: [001] Perfect
- Fracture: Uneven
- Mohs scale hardness: 1–2
- Luster: Earthy to waxy
- Streak: White
- Diaphaneity: Translucent to opaque
- Specific gravity: 2–3
- Optical properties: Biaxial (−) – 2V small
- Refractive index: n_{α} = 1.490 n_{β} = 1.500 n_{γ} = 1.520
- Birefringence: δ = 0.030

Hectorite is a rare soft, greasy, white, lithium-rich clay mineral with a chemical formula of Na_{0.3}(Mg,Li)_{3}Si_{4}O_{10}(OH)_{2}.

Hectorite was first described in 1941 and named for an occurrence in the United States near Hector, California (in San Bernardino County, California, 30 miles east of Barstow). Hectorite belongs to the smectite group; it is a swelling 2:1 clay mineral. Hectorite occurs with bentonite as an alteration product of clinoptilolite from volcanic ash and tuff with a high glass content. Hectorite is also found in the beige/brown clay ghassoul, mined in the Atlas Mountains in Morocco. A large deposit of hectorite is also found at the Thacker Pass lithium deposit, located within the McDermitt Caldera in Nevada. The Thacker Pass lithium deposit could be a significant source of lithium.

Despite its rarity, it is economically viable as the Hector mine sits over a large deposit of the mineral. Hectorite is mostly used in making cosmetics, but has uses in chemical and other industrial applications, and is a mineral source for refined lithium metal.

== See also ==
- Classification of minerals
- List of minerals
- Saponite – Phyllosilicate mineral in the smectite group
