= Berthierite =

Sulfosalt mineral: FeSb2S4

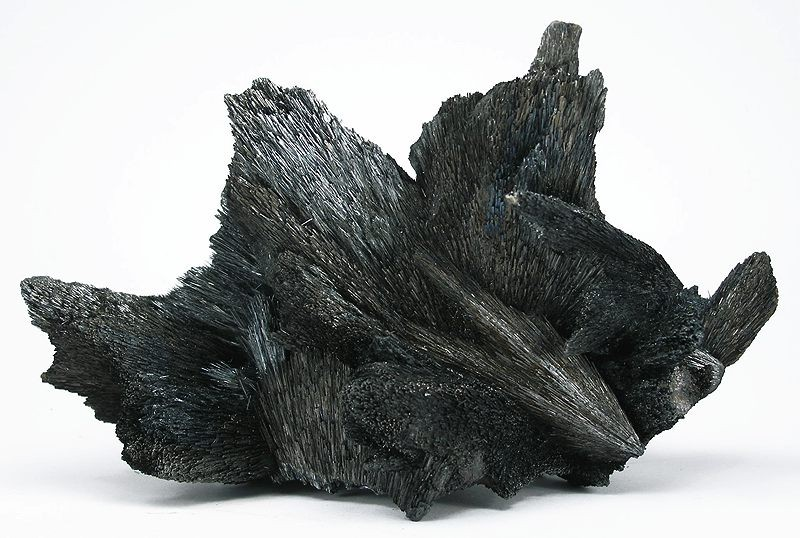

General
- Category: Minerals
- Formula: FeSb_{2}S_{4}
- IMA symbol: Btr
- Strunz classification: 2.HA.20
- Crystal system: Orthorhombic
- Crystal class: Dipyramidal (mmm); H-M symbol: (2/m 2/m 2/m)
- Space group: Pnam

Identification
- Color: Steel grey
- Cleavage: Poor/indistinct
- Mohs scale hardness: 2–3
- Luster: Metallic
- Diaphaneity: Opaque
- Specific gravity: 4.64

Berthierite is a mineral, a sulfide of iron and antimony with formula FeSb_{2}S_{4} (FeS·Sb_{2}S_{3}). It is steel grey in colour with a metallic lustre, which an iridescent tarnish can cover. Because of its appearance, it is often mistaken for stibnite (Sb_{2}S_{3}, an antimony trisulfide mineral, free of Fe^{2+} sulfide).

It was discovered in France in 1827 and named for the French chemist, Pierre Berthier (1782–1861).

Berthierine, an iron(II)-rich phyllosilicate from the serpentine subgroup, with as chemical formula (Mg,Fe)_{3}(Si_{2}O_{5})(OH)_{4}, was also named in honor of Pierre Berthier. The great similarity between the two names is a frequent source of confusion between these two very different mineral species.

== See also ==
- List of minerals
- List of minerals named after people
