= Halloysite =

Phyllosilicate mineral in the kaolinite subgroup

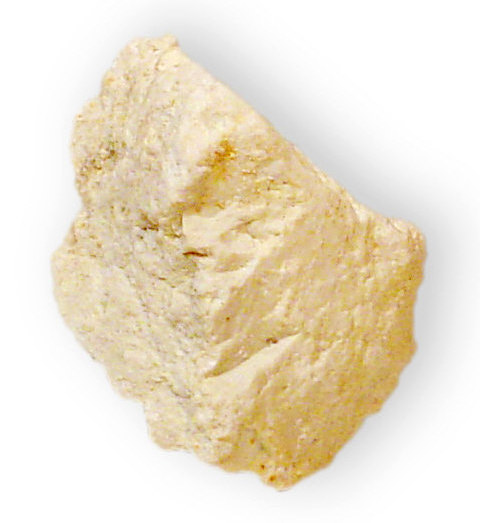

General
- Category: Phyllosilicate minerals
- Group: Kaolinite-Serpentine group, kaolinite subgroup
- Formula: Al_{2}Si_{2}O_{5}(OH)_{4}
- Strunz classification: 9.ED.10
- Crystal system: Monoclinic
- Crystal class: Domatic (m) (same H-M symbol)
- Space group: Cc
- Unit cell: a = 5.14, b = 8.9, c = 7.214 [Å]; β = 99.7°; Z = 1

Identification
- Color: White; grey, green, blue, yellow, red from included impurities.
- Crystal habit: Spherical clusters, massive
- Cleavage: Probable on {001}
- Fracture: Conchoidal
- Mohs scale hardness: 2–2.5
- Luster: Pearly, waxy, or dull
- Diaphaneity: Semitransparent
- Specific gravity: 2–2.65
- Optical properties: Biaxial
- Refractive index: n_{α} = 1.553–1.565 n_{β} = 1.559–1.569 n_{γ} = 1.560–1.570
- Birefringence: δ = 0.007

Halloysite is an aluminosilicate clay mineral with the empirical formula Al_{2}Si_{2}O_{5}(OH)_{4}. Its main constituents are oxygen (55.78%), silicon (21.76%), aluminium (20.90%), and hydrogen (1.56%). It is a member of the kaolinite group. Halloysite typically forms by hydrothermal alteration of alumino-silicate minerals. It can occur intermixed with dickite, kaolinite, montmorillonite and other clay minerals. X-ray diffraction studies are required for positive identification. It was first described in 1826, and subsequently named after, the Belgian geologist Omalius d'Halloy.

== Structure ==
Halloysite naturally occurs as small cylinders (nanotubes) that have a wall thickness of 10–15 atomic aluminosilicate sheets, an outer diameter of 50–60 nm, an inner diameter of 12–15 nm, and a length of 0.5–10 μm. Their outer surface is mostly composed of SiO_{2} and the inner surface of Al_{2}O_{3}, and hence those surfaces are oppositely charged. Two common forms are found. When hydrated, the clay exhibits a 1 nm spacing of the layers, and when dehydrated (meta-halloysite), the spacing is 0.7 nm. The cation exchange capacity depends on the amount of hydration, as 2H_{2}O has 5–10 meq/100 g, while 4H_{2}O has 40–50 meq/100g. Endellite is the alternative name for the Al_{2}Si_{2}O_{5}(OH)_{4}·2(H_{2}O) structure.

Owing to the layered structure of the halloysite, it has a large specific surface area, which can reach 117 m^{2}/g.

== Formation ==
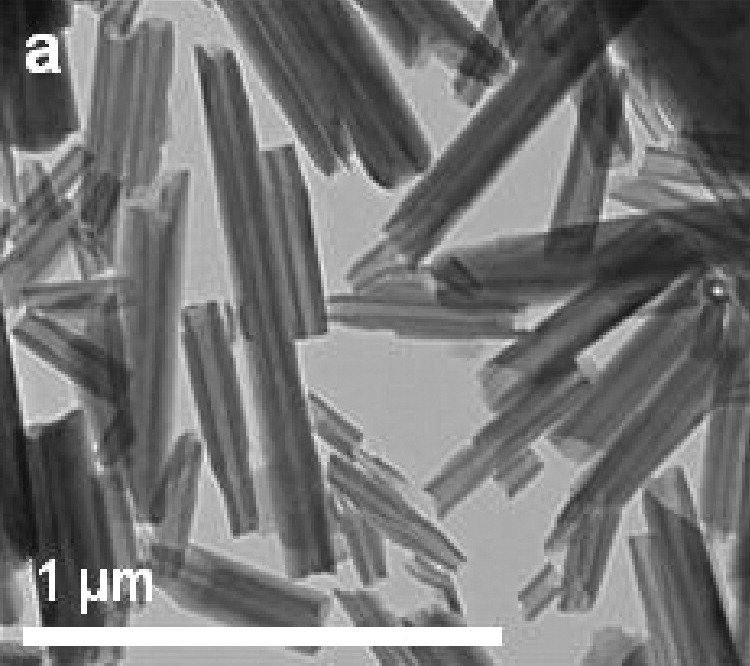
Electron micrograph of halloysite nanotubes

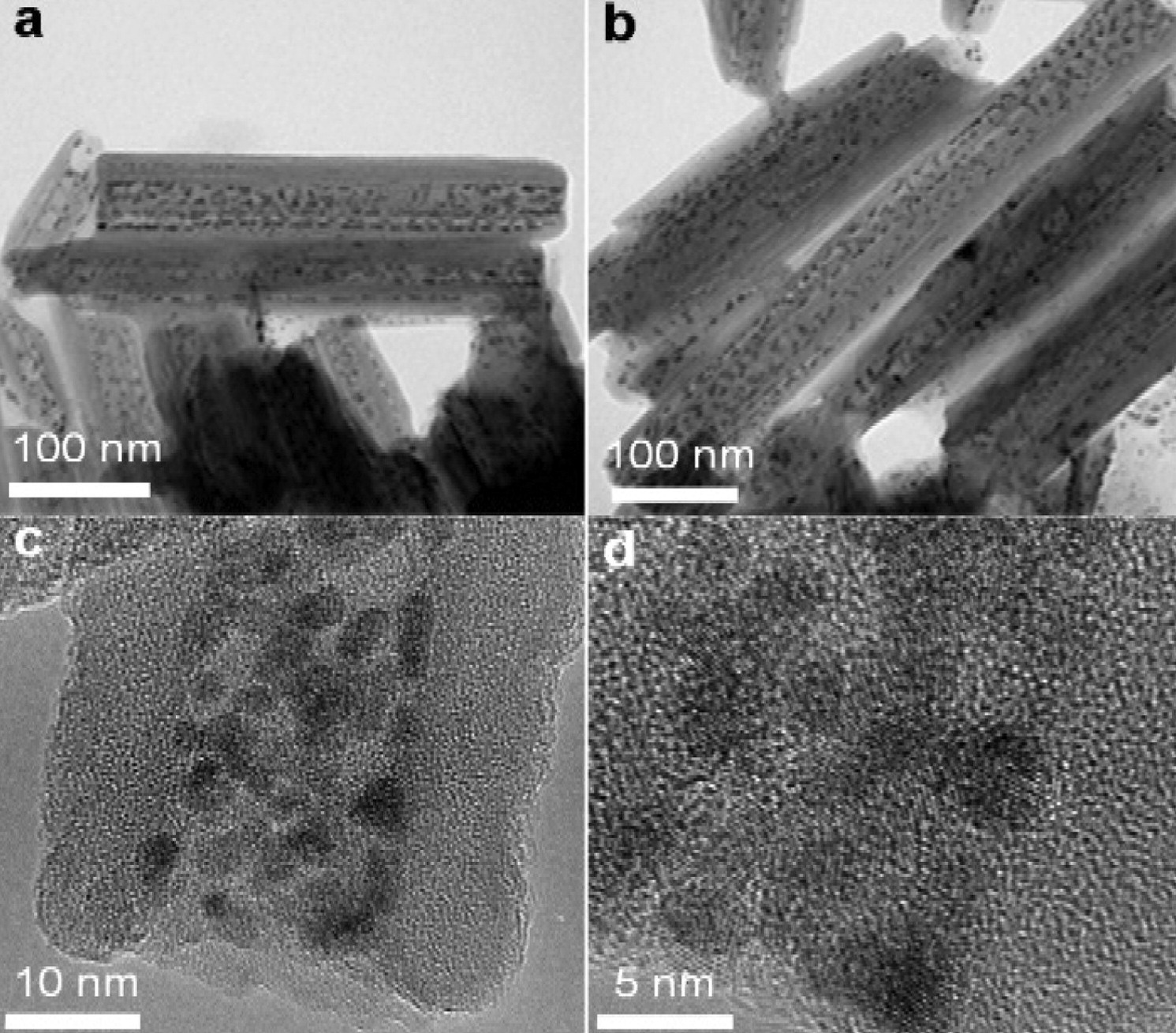
Halloysite nanotubes intercalated with ruthenium catalytic nanoparticles

The formation of halloysite is due to hydrothermal alteration, and it is often found near carbonate rocks. For example, halloysite samples found in Wagon Wheel Gap, Colorado, United States are suspected to be the weathering product of rhyolite by downward moving waters. In general the formation of clay minerals is highly favoured in tropical and sub-tropical climates due to the immense amounts of water flow. Halloysite has also been found overlaying basaltic rock, showing no gradual changes from rock to mineral formation. Halloysite occurs primarily in recently exposed volcanic-derived soils, but it also forms from primary minerals in tropical soils or pre-glacially weathered materials. Igneous rocks, especially glassy basaltic rocks are more susceptible to weathering and alteration forming halloysite.

Often as is the case with halloysite found in Juab County, Utah, United States the clay is found in close association with goethite and limonite and often interspersed with alunite. Feldspars are also subject to decomposition by water saturated with carbon dioxide. When feldspar occurs near the surface of lava flows, the CO_{2} concentration is high, and reaction rates are rapid. With increasing depth, the leaching solutions become saturated with silica, aluminium, sodium, and calcium. Once the solutions are depleted of CO_{2} they precipitate as secondary minerals. The decomposition is dependent on the flow of water. In the case that halloysite is formed from plagioclase it will not pass through intermediate stages.

== Locations ==
A highly refined halloysite is mined, then processed, from a rhyolite occurrence in Matauri Bay, New Zealand. Annual output of this mine is up to 20,000 tonnes per annum.

One of the largest halloysite deposits in the world is Dunino, near Legnica in Poland. It has reserves estimated at 10 million tons of material. This halloysite is characterized by layered-tubular and platy structure.

The Dragon mine, located in the Tintic district, Eureka, Utah, US deposit contains catalytic quality halloysite. The Dragon Mine Deposit is one of the largest in the United States. The total production throughout 1931–1962 resulted in nearly 750,000 metric tons of extracted halloysite. Pure halloysite classified at 10a and 7a are present.

== Applications ==
Commercial

Uses of the halloysite produced at the Matauri Bay deposit in New Zealand include porcelain and bone china by manufacturers in various countries, particularly in Asia.

Laboratory studies

- Halloysite is an efficient adsorbent both for cations and anions. It has also been used as a petroleum cracking catalyst, and Exxon has developed a cracking catalyst based on synthetic halloysite in the 1970s. Owing to its structure, halloysite can be used as filler in either natural or modified forms in nanocomposites. Halloysite nanotube can be intercalated with catalytic metal nanoparticles made of silver, ruthenium, rhodium, platinum or cobalt, thereby serving as a catalyst support.
- Halloysite has been evaluated for use in the sorption of CO_{2} and CH_{4}.
- Due to its nanostructure, halloysite is used as the main nanostructured filler in multifunctional mixed matrix membranes (MMMs), opening up new possibilities in the separation of gaseous and liquid mixtures and water purification.
- Besides supporting nanoparticles, halloysite nanotubes can also be used as a template to produce round well-dispersed nanoparticles (NPs). For example, bismuth and bismuth subcarbonate NPs with controlled size (~7 nm) were synthesized in water. Importantly, when halloysite was not used, large nanoplates instead of round spheres are obtained.
- Halloysite is also used to purify water, e.g. from two azo dyes were removed from aq. solutions. by adsorption on a Polish halloysite from Dunino deposit.
- Halloysite have many advantages and reported as a nanocontainer.
- Halloysite can also be used to produce porous silicon nanotubes as anode materials for Li-ion batteries through the selective etching of aluminium oxide and thermal reduction.
- As a nanofiller in nanocomposite e.g. thermoplastic polyurethane acting on the mechanical, physicochemical and biological properties.

== Chemistry and mineralogy ==
Typical chemical and mineralogical analyses of two commercial grades of halloysite are:

Product name	Premium	Yunnan
Country	New Zealand	China
Area	Northland	Yunnan
SiO_{2}, %	49.5	42.7
Al_{2}O_{3}, %	35.5	37.0
Fe_{2}O_{3}, %	0.29	0.10
TiO_{2}, %	0.09	<0.05
CaO, %	-	-
MgO, %	-	-
K_{2}O, %	-	<0.05
Na_{2}O, %	-	<0.05
LOI, %	13.8	19.8
Halloysite, %	92	99.1
Cristobalite, %	4	-
Quartz, %	1	0.1
