= Swelling index =

Swelling index may refer to the following material parameters that quantify volume change:

- Crucible swelling index, also known as free swelling index, in coal assay
- Swelling capacity, the amount of a liquid that can be absorbed by a polymer
- Shrink–swell capacity in soil mechanics
- Unload-reload constant (κ) in critical state soil mechanics
