= Nacrite =

Phyllosilicate mineral: group of kaolinite

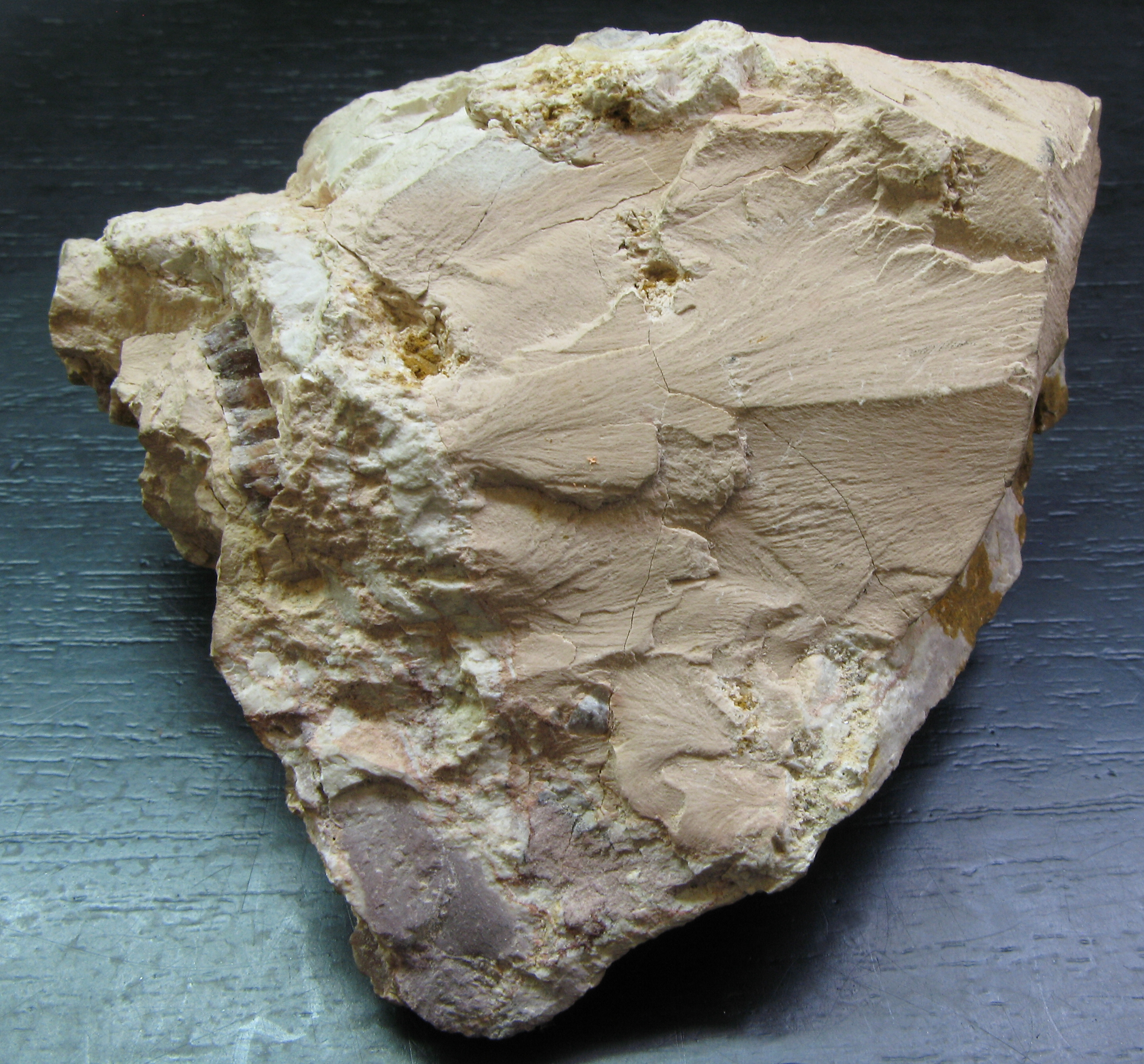
- Nacrite, "Frohe Hoffnung"-shaft, Wildental, Ore Mountains

General
- Category: Phyllosilicates; Kaolinite-serpentine group
- Formula: Al_{2}Si_{2}O_{5}(OH)_{4}
- IMA symbol: Ncr
- Strunz classification: 9.ED.05
- Crystal system: Monoclinic
- Crystal class: Domatic (m) (same H-M symbol)
- Space group: Cc

Identification

Nacrite Al_{2}Si_{2}O_{5}(OH)_{4} is a clay mineral that is polymorphous (or polytypic) with kaolinite. It crystallizes in the monoclinic system. X-ray diffraction analysis is required for positive identification.

Nacrite was first described in 1807 for an occurrence in Saxony, Germany. The name is from nacre in reference to the dull luster of the surface of nacrite masses scattering light with slight iridescences resembling those of the mother of pearls secreted by oysters.
