= Smectite =

Mineral mixture of phyllosilicates

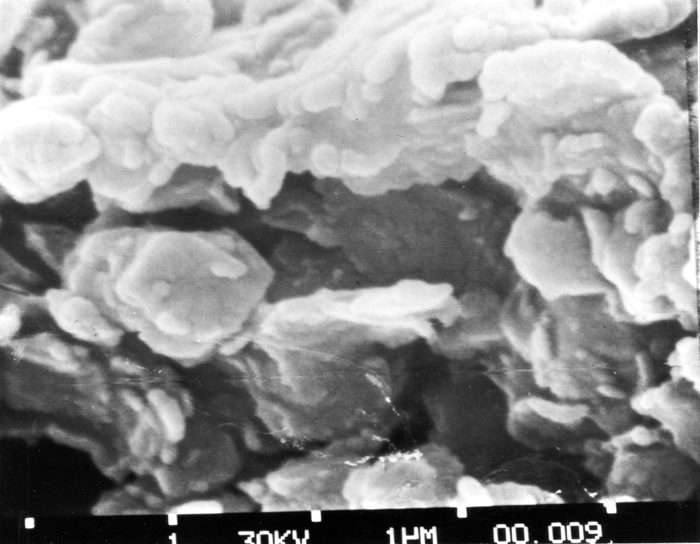
Scanning electron microscope (SEM) photograph of smectite clay – magnification 23,500 – U.S. Geological Survey – Tuckup Canyon

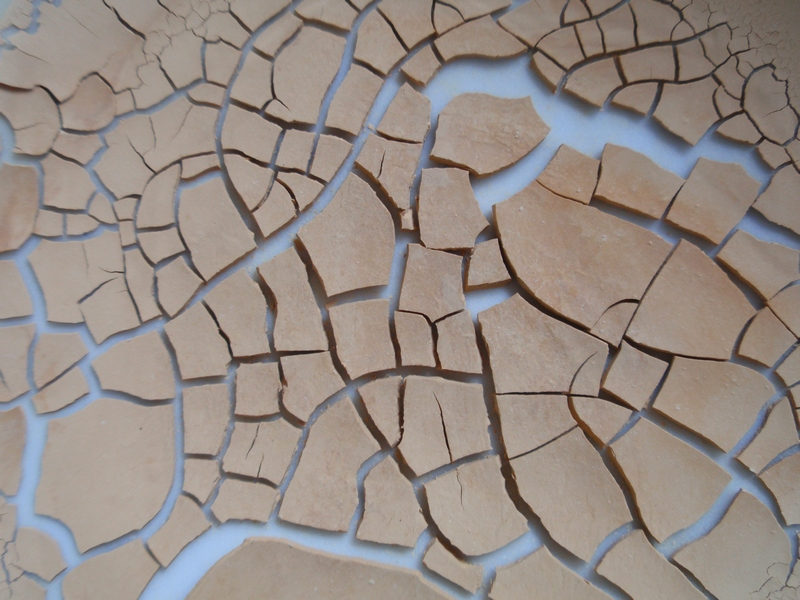
Typical cracks pattern of a smectite-rich bentonite after its desiccation and shrinkage

A smectite (from Ancient Greek σμηκτός (smēktós) 'lubricated'; from σμηκτρίς (smēktrís) 'walker's earth, fuller's earth'; lit. 'rubbing earth; earth that has the property of cleaning') is a mineral mixture of various swelling sheet silicates (phyllosilicates), which have a three-layer 2:1 (TOT) structure and belong to the clay minerals. Smectites mainly consist of montmorillonite, but can often contain secondary minerals such as quartz and calcite.

== Terminology ==
In clay mineralogy, smectite is synonym of montmorillonite (also the name of a pure clay mineral phase) to indicate a class of swelling clays. The term smectite is commonly used in Europe and in the UK while the term montmorillonite is preferred in North America, but both terms are equivalent and can be used interchangeably. For industrial and commercial applications, the term bentonite is mostly used in place of smectite or montmorillonite.

== Mineralogical structure ==
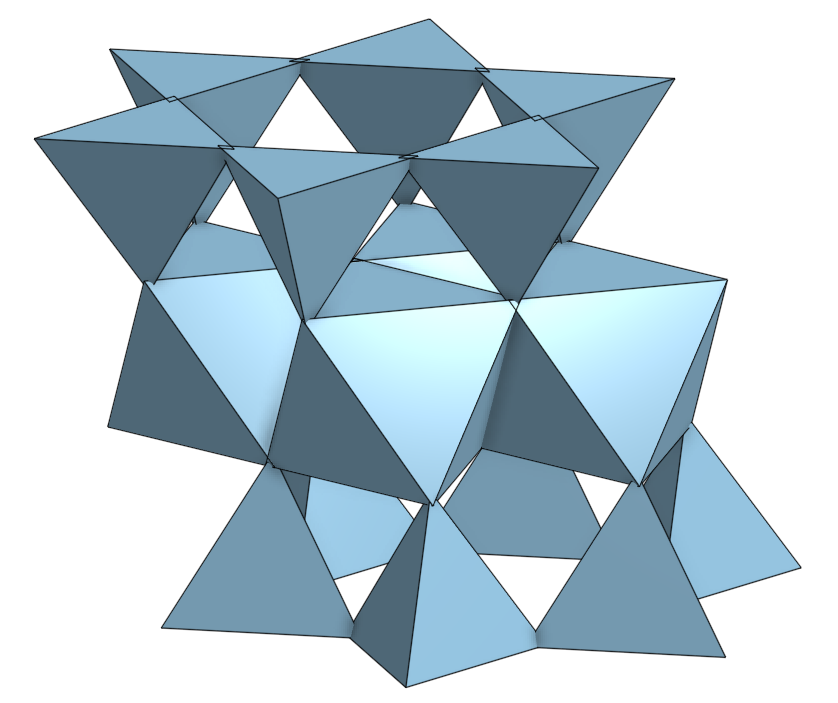
2:1 clay minerals crystallographic structure made of three superimposed sheets of tetrahedra-octahedra-tetrahedra (TOT layer unit), respectively

The 2:1 layer (TOT) structure consists of two silica (SiO_{2}) tetrahedral (T) layers which are electrostatically cross-linked via an Al_{2}O_{3} (gibbsite), or Fe_{2}O_{3}, octahedral (O) central layer. The TOT elementary layers are not rigidly connected to each other but are separated by a free space: the interlayer hosting hydrated cations and water molecules. Smectite can swell because of the reversible incorporation of water and cations in the interlayer space.

The TOT layers are negatively charged because of the isomorphic substitution of Si(IV) atoms by Al(III) atoms in the two external silica tetrahedral layers and because of the replacement of Al(III) or Fe(III) atoms by Mg^{2+} or Fe^{2+} cations in the inner gibbsite octahedral layer. As the +4 charges born by Si(IV), and normally compensated by −4 charges from the surrounding oxygen atoms, become +3 due to the substitution of Si(IV) by Al(III), an electrical imbalance occurs: +3 −4 = −1. The excess of negative charges in the TOT layer has to be compensated by the presence of positive cations in the interlayer. The same reasoning also applies to the gibbsite central layer of the TOT elementary unit when an Al^{3+} ion is replaced by a Mg^{2+} ion in a gibbsite octahedra. The electrical imbalance is: +2 −3 = −1.

== Role of interlayer cations in the swelling process ==
Detailed molecular structure of pure montmorillonite, the best known end-member of the smectite group. The interlayer space between two successive TOT layers is filled with hydrated cations (mainly Na^{+} and Ca^{2+} ions) compensating the negative electrical charges of the TOT layers and with water molecules causing the interlayer expansion.

The main cations in the smectite interlayers are Na^{+} and Ca^{2+}. The sodium cations are responsible for the highest swelling of smectite while calcium ions have lower swelling properties. Calcium smectite has significantly less swelling capacity than sodium smectite but is also less prone to shrinking when desiccated.

The degree of hydration of the cations and their corresponding hydrated radii explain the swelling or the shrinking behaviour of phyllosilicates. Other cations such as Mg^{2+} and K^{+} ions exhibit even a more contrasted effect: highly hydrated magnesium ions are "swellers" as in vermiculite (totally expanded interlayer) while poorly hydrated potassium ions are "collapsers" like in illite (totally collapsed interlayer).

As the interlayer space of smectites is more open and so more easily accessible to water and cations, smectites exhibit the highest cation-exchange capacity (CEC) of clay minerals commonly found in the soils. Only more expandable vermiculite and some rarer alumino-silicate minerals (zeolites) with inner channel structure can exhibit a higher CEC than smectite.

== Formation process ==
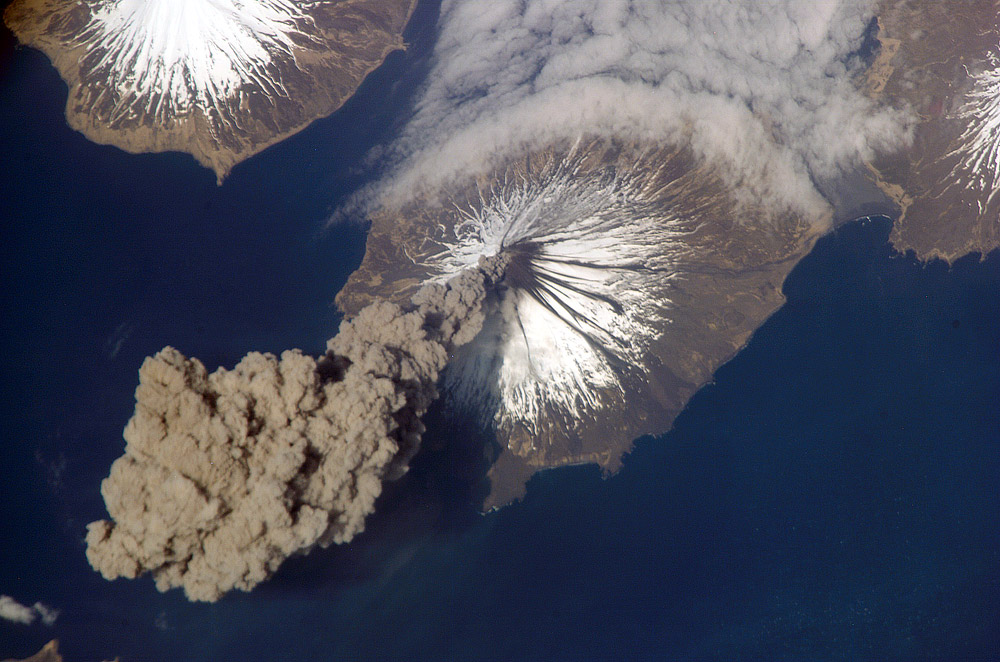
Typical volcanic eruption plume whose ashes' weathering after contact with seawater is the main source of smectite. Leaching of most of amorphous silica leads to partial dissolution of obsidian, the main constituent of volcanic glass.

Smectites are formed from the weathering of basalt, gabbro, and silica-rich volcanic glass (e.g., pumice, obsidian, rhyolite, dacite). Many smectites are formed in volcanic hydrothermal system (such as geyser system) where hot water percolating through the porous matrix or the cracks of the volcanic ash deposit (pumice, pozzolan) dissolves most of amorphous silica (up to 50 wt.% of SiO_{2} can be dissolved), leaving smectite in place. This mechanism is responsible for the formation of the bentonite deposit (Serrata de Nijar) of Cabo de Gata in the south-east region of Almeria in Andalusia (Spain). Wyoming MX-80 bentonite was formed in a similar way during the Cretaceous Period when volcanic ashes were falling in an inner sea on the American continent. The highly porous (with a large and easily accessible specific surface) and very reactive volcanic ashes rapidly reacted with seawater. Because of silica hydrolysis, most of silica was dissolved in seawater and removed from the ashes giving rise to the formation of smectites. Smectites found in many marine clay deposits are often formed in this way as it is the case for the Ypresian Clays found in Belgium and very rich in smectites.

== Industrial applications ==
Smectites are commonly used in very diverse industrial applications. In civil engineering works, it is routinely used as a thick bentonite slurry when excavating deep and narrow trenches in the ground to support the lateral walls and to avoid their collapse. It is also used as mud for drilling fluids. Smectites, more commonly called bentonite, are candidate as buffer and backfill materials to fill the space around high-level radioactive waste in deep geological repositories. Smectites also serve as a base for certain fabric softeners, an additive in paints, or as a thickening agent for various preparations.

== See also ==
- Argillaceous minerals
- Bentonite
- Clay
- Clay chemistry
- Clay mineral
- Clay–water interaction
- Expansive clay
- Hectorite
- Montmorillonite
- Nontronite
- Saponite
