= Nontronite =

Phyllosilicate mineral in the smectite group

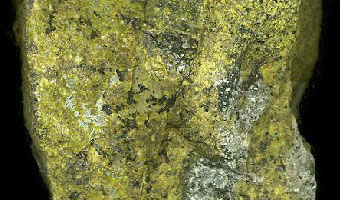
- Nontronite from Slovakia

General
- Category: Phyllosilicate minerals
- Group: Smectite group
- Formula: (Ca_{0.5},Na)_{0.3}Fe^{III}_{2}(Si,Al)_{4}O_{10}(OH)_{2}·nH_{2}O
- IMA symbol: Non
- Strunz classification: 9.EC.40
- Crystal system: Monoclinic
- Space group: C2/m (no. 12)

Identification
- Color: Yellow, olive-green, green, orange, brown
- Crystal habit: Earthy masses
- Cleavage: Perfect basal
- Fracture: Uneven
- Mohs scale hardness: 1.5 to 2
- Luster: Earthy to dull
- Streak: Colorless
- Specific gravity: 2.3
- Optical properties: Biaxial (−)
- Refractive index: nα = 1.530–1.580; nβ = 1.555–1.612; nγ = 1.560–1.615
- Birefringence: δ = 0.030–0.035

Nontronite is the iron(III) rich member of the smectite group of clay minerals. Nontronites typically have a chemical composition consisting of more than ~30% Fe_{2}O_{3} and less than ~12% Al_{2}O_{3} (ignited basis). Nontronite has very few economic deposits like montmorillonite. Like montmorillonite, nontronite can have variable amounts of adsorbed water associated with the interlayer surfaces and the exchangeable cations.

Ignoring the isomorphic substitution of Si by Al, with exchangeable cations compensating for the resulting negative electrical charges and their hydration water in the interlayers, the elemental composition of nontronite could be idealised as simply Fe^{III}_{2}Si_{4}O_{10}(OH)_{2}.

A typical structural formula for nontronite is Ca_{0.3}(Fe^{III}_{3.5}Al_{0.4}Mg_{0.1})(Si_{7}Al_{0.8}Fe_{0.2})O_{20}(OH)_{4}·nH_{2}O. The dioctahedral sheet of nontronite is composed mainly of trivalent iron (Fe^{3+}) cations, although some substitution by trivalent aluminium (Al^{3+}) and divalent magnesium (Mg^{2+}) does occur. The tetrahedral sheet is composed mainly of silicon (Si^{4+}), but can have substantial (about 1 in 8) substitution of either Fe^{3+} or Al^{3+}, or combinations of these two cations. Thus, nontronite is typically characterised by having most (usually greater than 60%) of the layer charge located in the tetrahedral sheet. The layer charge is generally balanced by divalent calcium (Ca^{2+}) or magnesium (Mg^{2+}).

Nontronite forms from the weathering of biotite and basalts, precipitation of iron- and silicon-rich hydrothermal fluids and in deep sea hydrothermal vents. Some evidence suggests that microorganisms may play an important role in their formation. Microorganisms are also involved in reduction of structural iron in nontronite when soils undergo anoxia, and the reduced form of the clay appears to be highly reactive towards certain pollutants, perhaps contributing to the destruction of these compounds in the environment.

It was named by Pierre Berthier in 1827 from the town of Nontron in the Dordogne department in Nouvelle-Aquitaine in southwestern France, near its type locality.

The only known commercially viable and operational nontronite mine is located in Canterbury, New Zealand. Palmer Resources operates this mine. The finished products are used internationally in industrial applications (pulp & paper, surface coating) and in cosmetics marketed as New Zealand Glacial Clay.

== See also ==
- Saponite – Phyllosilicate mineral in the smectite group
