= Saponite =

Phyllosilicate mineral in the smectite group

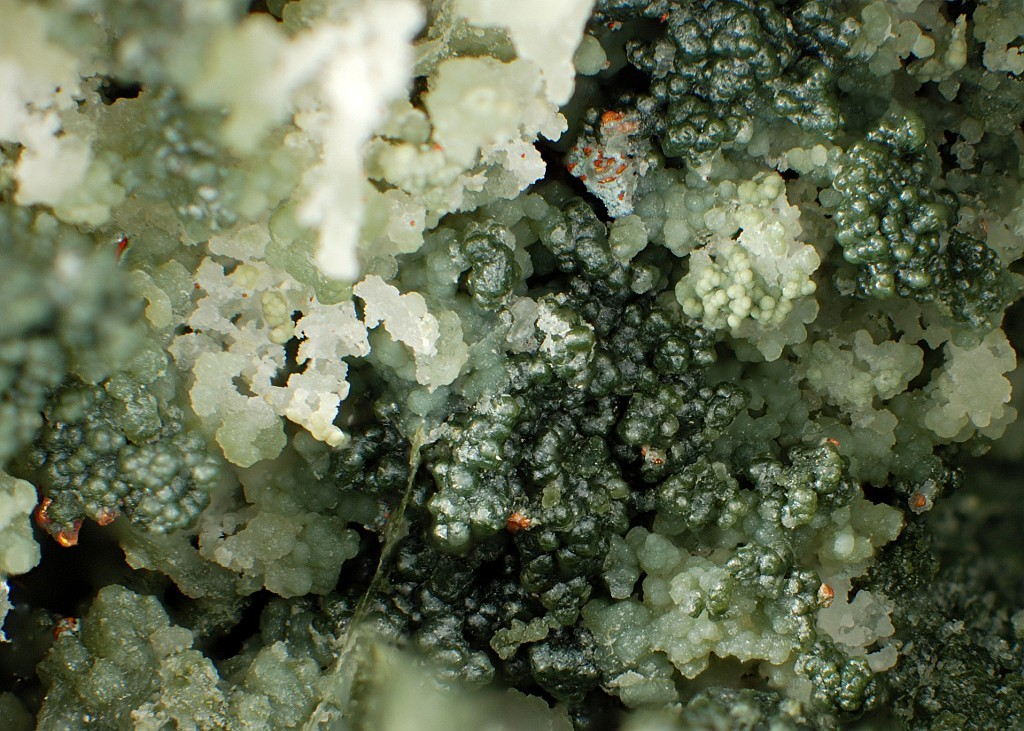
- Saponite (light green) mixed with chamosite (dark green) and copper

General
- Category: Phyllosilicate minerals
- Group: Smectite group
- Formula: Ca_{0.25}(Mg,Fe)_{3}((Si,Al)_{4}O_{10})(OH)_{2}·n(H_{2}O)
- IMA symbol: Sap
- Strunz classification: 9.EC.45
- Crystal system: Monoclinic
- Crystal class: Prismatic (2/m) (same H-M symbol)
- Space group: C2/m
- Unit cell: a = 5.3 Å, b = 9.14 Å c = 16.9 Å; β = 97°; Z = 2

Identification
- Color: White, yellow, red, green, blue
- Crystal habit: Granular – Massive
- Cleavage: {001} perfect
- Tenacity: Brittle dry, plastic when hydrated
- Mohs scale hardness: 1.5
- Luster: Greasy, dull
- Streak: White
- Diaphaneity: Translucent
- Specific gravity: 2.24–2.30
- Optical properties: Biaxial (−)
- Refractive index: n_{α} = 1.479 – 1.490 n_{β} = 1.510 – 1.525 n_{γ} = 1.511 – 1.527
- Birefringence: δ = 0.032 – 0.037
- Pleochroism: X = colorless, light yellow to green-brown; Y = Z = colorless, greenish brown to dark brown
- 2V angle: Calculated: 20° to 26°

Saponite is a trioctahedral mineral of the smectite group. Its chemical formula is Ca_{0.25}(Mg,Fe)_{3}((Si,Al)_{4}O_{10})(OH)_{2}·n(H_{2}O). It is soluble in sulfuric acid. It was first described in 1840 by Svanberg. Varieties of saponite are griffithite, bowlingite and sobotkite.

It is soft, massive, and plastic, and exists in veins and cavities in serpentinite and basalt. The name is derived from the Greek sapo, soap. Other names include bowlingite; mountain soap; piotine; soapstone.

== Occurrence ==
Saponite was first described in 1840 for an occurrence in Lizard Point, Landewednack, Cornwall, England. It occurs in hydrothermal veins, in basalt vesicles, skarns, amphibolite and serpentinite. Associated minerals include celadonite, chlorite, native copper, epidote, orthoclase, dolomite, calcite and quartz.

Saponite is found in Ząbkowice Śląskie in Silesia, Svärdsjö in Dalarna, Sweden and in Cornwall, UK. The soapstone of Cornwall is used in the porcelain factory. Saponite is also found in the "dark rims" of chondrules in carbonaceous chondrites and seen as a sign of aqueous alteration. Europe's largest primary diamond deposit, Lomonosov, in the Primorsky District of Arkhangelsk Oblast is an area of intensive accumulation and storage of saponite at the tailings.

== Application ==
The forecasted mass of saponite to be discharged into the tailings of diamond ore processing makes up millions of tons. Worryingly, when macro- and micro-components are found in non-hazardous concentrations, fewer efforts are put into the environmental management of the tailings, though technogenic sediments offer prospects for reuse and valorization beyond their traditional disposal. Saponite is a demonstrative example of the tailings constituent that is often left unfairly mistreated.

Electrochemical separation helps to obtain modified saponite-containing products with high smectite-group minerals concentrations, lower mineral particles size, more compact structure, and greater surface area. These characteristics open possibilities for the manufacture of high-quality ceramics and heavy-metal sorbents from saponite-containing products. Furthermore, tail grinding occurs during the preparation of the raw material for ceramics; this waste reprocessing is of high importance for the use of clay pulp as a neutralizing agent, as fine particles are required for the reaction. Experiments on the histosol deacidification with the alkaline clay slurry demonstrated that neutralization with an average pH of 7.1 is reached at 30% of the pulp added and an experimental site with perennial grasses proved the efficacy of the technique. Moreover, the reclamation of disturbed lands is an integral part of the social and environmental responsibility of the mining company and this scenario addresses the community necessities at both local and regional levels.

Synthetic saponites have defined chemical composition and reactive surface and serve as a substitute for zeolites. In contrast to the pores in zeolites, saponites have a larger layer spacing and can also be used as catalysts for larger organic molecules, e.g. in polymerization, isomerization and cracking.

== See also ==
- Classification of minerals
- Hectorite – Phyllosilicate mineral in the smectite group
- Nontronite – Phyllosilicate mineral in the smectite group
- List of minerals
