= Vermiculite =

Hydrous phyllosilicate mineral

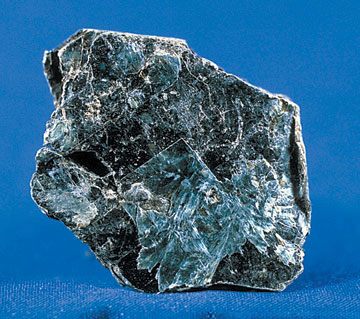

General
- Category: Phyllosilicates
- Formula: (Mg,Fe^{2+},Fe^{3+})_{3}[(Al,Si)_{4}O_{10}](OH)_{2}·4H_{2}O
- IMA symbol: Vrm
- Strunz classification: 9.EC.50
- Crystal system: Monoclinic
- Crystal class: Prismatic (2/m) (same H-M symbol)
- Space group: C2/m
- Unit cell: a = 5.24 Å, b = 9.17 Å c = 28.6 Å; β = 94.6°; Z = 2

Identification
- Color: Colorless, white, yellow, green, brown, black
- Crystal habit: As large crystalline plates to clay-sized particles; lamellar to scaly
- Cleavage: Perfect on {001}
- Tenacity: Pliable
- Mohs scale hardness: 1.5–2
- Luster: Greasy or vitreous (pearly at cleavage planes)
- Streak: White or yellowish, translucent, shiny, light-brown or greenish in color, in some cases. For example, palabora vermuculite.
- Diaphaneity: Translucent
- Specific gravity: 2.4–2.7 (0.065–0.130 when exfoliated)
- Optical properties: Biaxial (−)
- Refractive index: n_{α} = 1.525 – 1.561 n_{β} = 1.545 – 1.581 n_{γ} = 1.545 – 1.581
- Birefringence: δ = 0.020
- Pleochroism: X in paler shades than Y and Z

Vermiculite is a hydrous phyllosilicate mineral which undergoes significant expansion when heated. Exfoliation occurs when the mineral is heated sufficiently; commercial furnaces can routinely produce this effect. Vermiculite forms by the weathering or hydrothermal alteration of biotite or phlogopite. Large commercial vermiculite mines exist in the United States, Russia, South Africa, China, and Brazil.

== Occurrence ==
Vermiculite was first described in 1824 for an occurrence in Millbury, Massachusetts. Its name is from the Latin vermiculare, "to breed worms", for the manner in which it exfoliates when heated.

It typically occurs as an alteration product at the contact between felsic and mafic or ultramafic rocks such as pyroxenites and dunites. It also occurs in carbonatites and metamorphosed magnesium-rich limestone. Associated mineral phases include: corundum, apatite, serpentine, and talc. It occurs interlayered with chlorite, biotite and phlogopite.

== Structure ==
Vermiculite is a 2:1 clay, meaning it has two tetrahedral sheets for every one octahedral sheet. It is a limited-expansion clay with a medium shrink–swell capacity. Vermiculite has a high cation-exchange capacity (CEC) at 100–150 meq/100 g. Vermiculite clays are weathered micas in which the potassium ions between the molecular sheets are replaced by magnesium and iron ions.

== Commercial uses ==
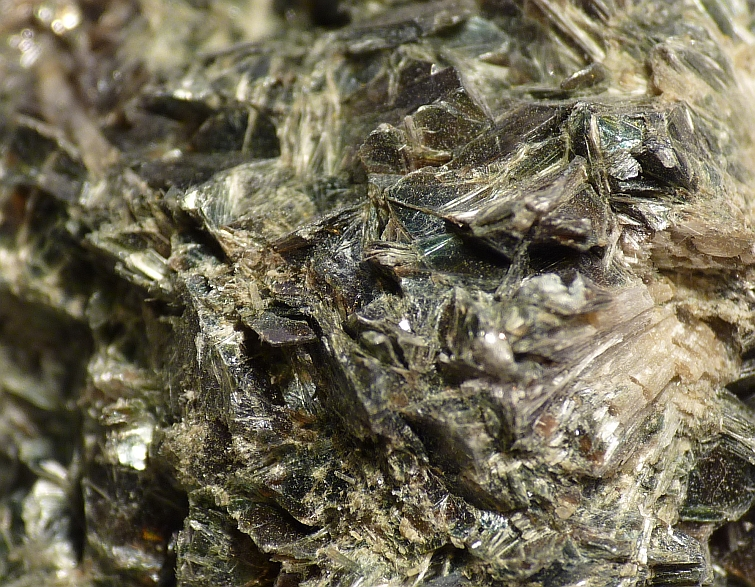
Vermiculite from Paakkila, Tuusniemi, Eastern Finland

=== Molded shapes ===
This process involves mixing exfoliated vermiculite with inorganic bonding agents such as sodium silicate, cement (specific quantities), and other compounds, such as those containing potassium, to produce an 'earth damp' mixture. This material is then hydraulically pressed into shape in a mold and then heat cured at temperatures up to 180 °C for up to 24 hours, depending upon the thickness of the moulded part. Such parts can withstand service temperatures of up to 1150 °C and are often used in the aluminium smelting industry as back-up insulation behind the carbon cathode in the pot cells which contain the molten mixture of cryolite and alumina. The moulded shapes and boards are used in:

- Open fireplaces
- High-temperature or refractory insulation
- Acoustic panels
- Fireproofing of structural steel and pipes

=== Calcium silicate boards ===
Exfoliated vermiculite is added to a calcium silicate slurry. This is then dewatered by pressing or by using one of the Fourdriner/Magnani/Hatschek processes to form a flat board which is then heat cured under pressure (typically 10–15 bar) for periods of up to 24 hours.

=== Brake linings ===
Finer grades of exfoliated vermiculite are being used in brake linings primarily for the automotive market. The properties of vermiculite that make it an appropriate choice for use in brake linings include its thermal resistance, ease of addition to other raw materials to achieve a homogeneous mix, and its shape and surface characteristics.

=== Roof and floor screeds and insulating concretes ===
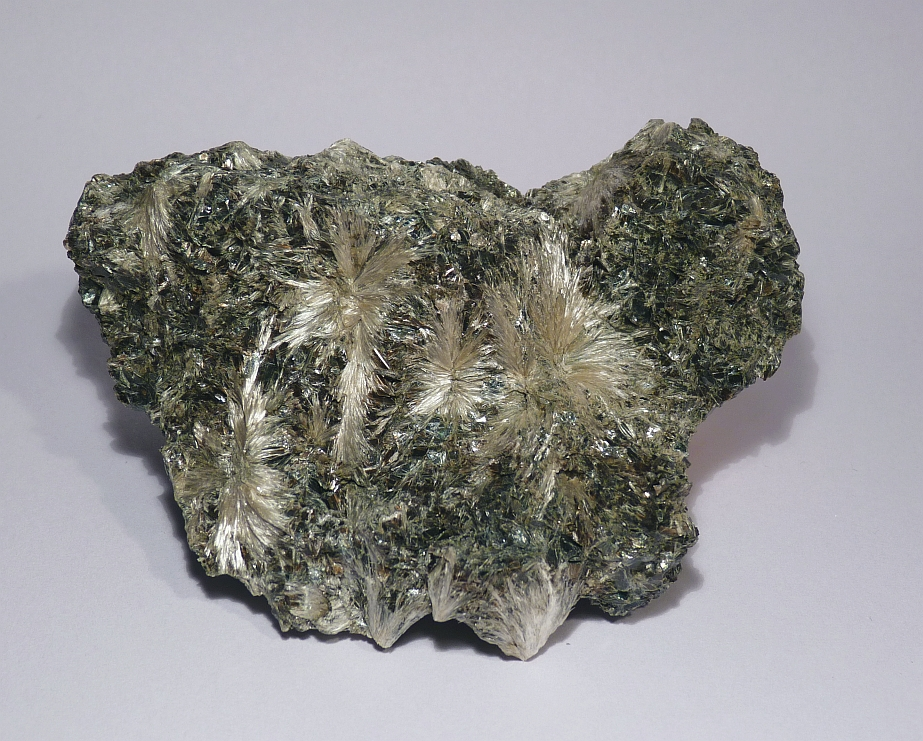
Anthophyllite, vermiculite

Exfoliated vermiculite (typically the finer grades) can be added at site to Portland cement and other aggregates, rheological aids, and water to produce roof and floor concrete screeds (i.e. top layer screed coats) which are lightweight and insulating. In many cases, vermiculite-based roof screeds are used in conjunction with other insulation materials, such as polystyrene board, to form a total roofing system. A bituminous binder can also be used with exfoliated vermiculite to produce a dry, lightweight roof screed which has the advantages of low thermal conductivity, low moisture content, and ease of placement (by pouring from the bag and then tamping).

=== Soilless growing medium ===
Exfoliated vermiculite is combined with other materials such as peat or composted pine bark to produce soilless growing medium for the professional horticulturalist and for the home gardener. These mixes promote faster root growth and give quick anchorage to young roots. The mixture helps retain air, fertilizer, and moisture, releasing them as the plant requires them. These mixes were pioneered by Boodley and Sheldrake. Exfoliated vermiculite is also used as a growing medium for hydroponics.

=== Seed germination ===
Vermiculite, alone or mixed with soil or peat, is used to germinate seeds; very little watering is required. When vermiculite is used alone, seedlings should be fed with a weak fertilizer solution when the first true leaves appear, e.g. with one teaspoon of 5-10-5 soluble fertilizer per US gallon of water (1:768 ratio), gradually increased to one tablespoon (1:256 ratio) when transplanting.

=== Root crop storage ===
The absorptive power of vermiculite acts as a regulator that prevents mildew and moisture fluctuation during the storage period. It will not absorb moisture from the inside of stored tubers, but it does take up free water from the outside, preventing storage rot.

=== Soil conditioner ===
Where the native soil is heavy or sticky, gentle mixing of vermiculite as a soil conditioner—up to one-half the volume of the soil—is recommended. This creates air channels and allows the soil mix to breathe. Mixing vermiculite in flower and vegetable gardens or in potted plants will provide the necessary air to maintain vigorous plant growth. Where soils are sandy, mixing of vermiculite into the soil will allow the soil to hold the water and air needed for growth.

=== As loose-fill insulation ===
Exfoliated vermiculite treated with a water repellent is used to fill the pores and cavities of masonry construction and hollow blockwork to enhance fire ratings (e.g. Underwriters Laboratories Wall and Partition designs), thermal insulation, and acoustic performance. Expanded vermiculite has also been used as thermal insulation in the attics and walls of houses and in water heaters, fire safes, stoves, furnaces, and refrigerators.

=== Refractory/insulation gunning and castable mixes ===
Exfoliated vermiculite can be combined with high alumina (also known as calcium aluminate) cements and other aggregates such as expanded shale, clay, and slate or sodium silicate to produce refractory/insulation concretes and mortars. In the early days of their use, these products were batched at or very close to the place of installation. This continues to be the case in some limited circumstances; however, more and more use is being made of pre-batched, proprietary mixes. Mixes containing vermiculite are used in areas where strength and corrosion/abrasion resistance are of secondary importance, the most important factor being the insulation performance of the in-place refractory lining. These mixes are used in industries including iron/steel, cement, and hydrocarbon processing.

=== Fire protection ===
Vermiculite board used for ductwork fireproofing

Vermiculite is used as an additive to fireproof wallboard.

=== High temperature coating ===
Vermiculite dispersions are typically either chemically or physically very finely delaminated vermiculite in a fluid medium. These dispersions can be used to make vermiculite 'paper' sheets by pouring them onto a piece of smooth, low surface-energy plastic, and allowing to dry

. The resulting sheet can then be peeled off the plastic. Typical end-uses for vermiculite dispersions include inclusion in high temperature coatings or binders for construction materials, gaskets, specialty papers/textiles, oxidation-resistant coating on carbon based composites, and as barrier coatings for films.

=== Waste treatment ===
The cation exchange capacity (up to 1,000 milliequivalents per kg) of vermiculite allows it to be used in fluid purification processes for waste water, chemical processing, and the pollution-control of air in mines and gases in industrial processes. In addition to its ion exchange properties, exfoliated vermiculite can retain liquids within the inter-laminar voids of the individual particles, as well as between the particles themselves.

=== Others ===
- As a packing material, valued for its high absorbency.
- As a cooling substrate in blacksmithing.
- As a substrate for various animals and/or a medium for incubation of eggs.
- As a lightweight aggregate for plaster, proprietary concrete compounds, firestop mortar, and cementitious spray fireproofing: Exfoliated vermiculite is used in both hand and spray-applied general building plasters to improve coverage, ease of handling, adhesion to a wide variety of substrates, fire resistance, and resistance to chipping/cracking/shrinkage.
- As a component of the interior fill for firestop pillows, along with graphite.
- As a carrier for dry handling and slow release of agricultural chemicals.
- As a hot topping: both exfoliated and crude vermiculite have been used for hot topping in the steel industry. When poured onto molten metal, crude vermiculite exfoliates immediately and forms an insulating layer, allowing the material to be transported to the next production process without losing too much heat.
- Used to permit slow cooling of hot pieces in glassblowing, lampwork, steelwork, and glass beadmaking.
- Used in in-ground swimming pools to provide a smooth pool base: Finer grades of exfoliated vermiculite plus Portland cement may be combined either on-site or in a factory premix to provide a base for swimming pool vinyl liners. These mixes are pumped into place using a rotor stator pump, or hand poured.
- Used in commercial hand warmers.
- Used in AGA cookers as insulation.
- Used in explosives storage as a blast mitigant.
- Used to absorb hazardous liquids for solid disposal.
- Used in gas fireplaces to simulate embers.
- Used as part of a substrate for cultivation of fungi.

== Commercial manufacture of exfoliated vermiculite ==
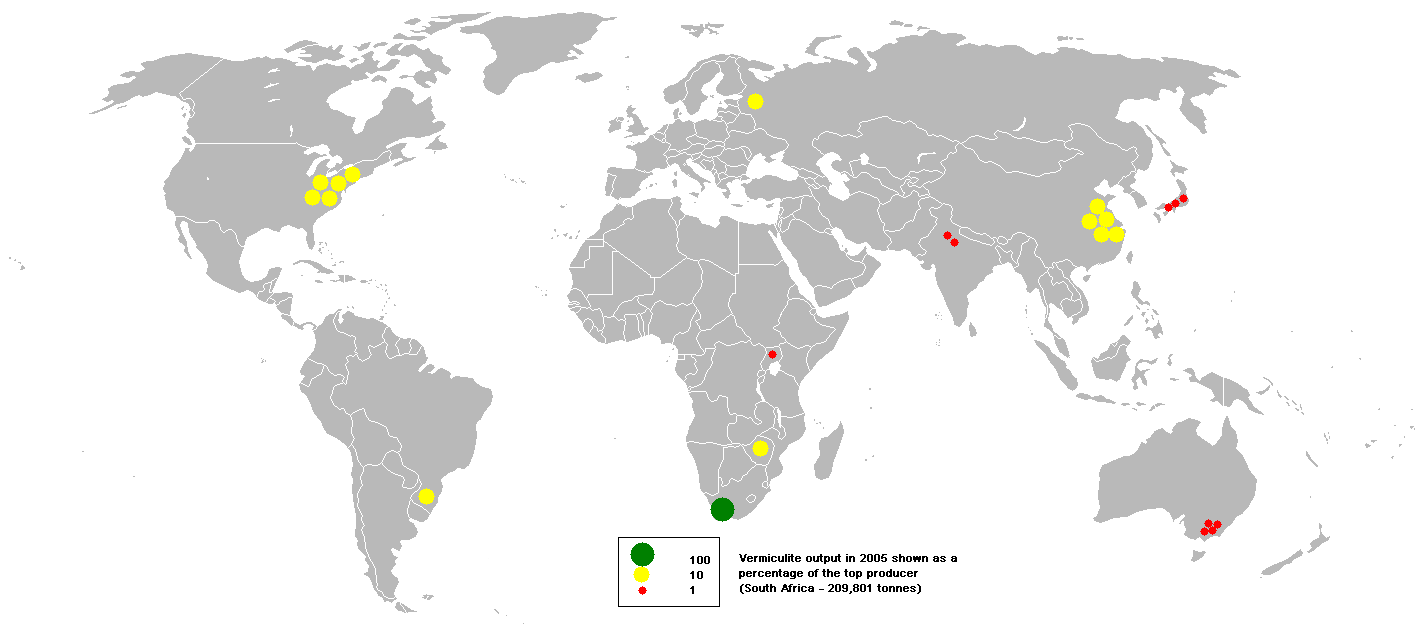
Vermiculite output in 2005

In 2014, South Africa, Brazil, the US, and China were the top producers of mined, concentrated and unexfoliated vermiculite, with about 90% world share. South Africa's production is decreasing, while Brazil's is significantly increasing.

While some end processors and exfoliators of vermiculite specialize, with proprietary products sold in a wide variety of industries, some have more varied end products, with less stringent technical requirements. Some vermiculite exfoliators blend with lower-cost perlite also. Vermiculite exfoliators have an international trade association called The Vermiculite Association to represent the industry's interests and to exchange information.

== Asbestos contamination ==
Although not all vermiculite contains asbestos, some products were made with vermiculite that contained asbestos until the early 1990s. Vermiculite mines throughout the world are now regularly tested for it and are supposed to sell products that contain no asbestos. The former vermiculite mine in Libby, Montana, did have tremolite asbestos as well as winchite and richterite (both fibrous amphiboles)—in fact, it was formed underground through essentially the same geologic processes as the contaminants.

Pure vermiculite does not contain asbestos and is non-toxic. Impure vermiculite may contain, apart from asbestos, also minor diopside or remnants of the precursor minerals biotite or phlogopite.

== Controversy over health risks ==
The largest and oldest vermiculite mine in the United States was started in the 1920s, at Libby, Montana, and the vermiculite was sold under the commercial name Zonolite. The Zonolite brand and the mine were acquired by the W. R. Grace and Company in 1963. Mining operations at the Libby site stopped in 1990 in response to asbestos contamination. While in operation, the Libby mine may have produced 80% of the world's supply of vermiculite.

The United States government estimates that vermiculite was used in more than 35 million homes, but does not recommend its removal. Nevertheless, homes or structures containing vermiculite or vermiculite insulation dating from before the mid-1990s—and especially those known to contain the "Zonolite" brand—may contain asbestos, and therefore may be a health concern.

An article published in The Salt Lake Tribune on December 3, 2006, reported that vermiculite and Zonolite had been found to contain asbestos, which had led to cancers such as those found in asbestos-related cases. The article stated that there had been a cover-up by W. R. Grace and Company and others regarding the health risks associated with vermiculite and that several sites in the Salt Lake Valley had been remediated by the EPA when they were shown to be contaminated with asbestos. W. R. Grace and Company has vigorously denied these charges.

The vermiculite deposit at the mine in Libby, Montana, was (and is) heavily contaminated with asbestos. Numerous people were knowingly exposed to the harmful dust of vermiculite that contained asbestos. The mine had been operating since the 1920s, and environmental and industrial controls were virtually non-existent until the mine was purchased by the W. R. Grace and Company in 1963. Yet, knowing the human health risks, the mining company still continued to operate there until 1990. Consequently, many of the former miners and residents of Libby have been affected and continue to suffer health problems. Over 400 people in the town have died from asbestos-related disease due to contamination from vermiculite mining from nearby Zonolite Mountain, where soil samples were found to be loaded with fibrous tremolite (known to be a very hazardous form of asbestos), and countless others there who insulated their homes with Zonolite have succumbed to asbestos-related diseases, most of whom never were employed in environments where asbestos was an issue.

After a 1999 Seattle Post-Intelligencer story claimed that asbestos-related disease was common in the town, the EPA, in response to political pressure, made cleanup of the site a priority and called Libby the worst case of community-wide exposure to a toxic substance in U.S. history. The EPA has spent $120 million in Superfund money on cleanup. In October 2006, W. R. Grace and Company tried to appeal the fines ($54.5 million) levied on them from the EPA, but the Supreme Court rejected the appeal. The United States government pursued criminal charges against several former executives and managers of the mine for allegedly disregarding and covering up health risks to employees. They were also accused of wire fraud, and of obstructing the government's cleanup efforts. As of the indictment date, about 1,200 residents of the Libby area had been identified as suffering from some kind of asbestos-related abnormality. The case ended in acquittals on May 8, 2009. On June 17, 2009, the EPA issued a public health emergency in and near Libby, thereby allowing federal agencies to provide funding for health care, and for removal of contaminated insulation from affected homes.

== See also ==
- Asbestos – Carcinogenic fibrous silicate mineral
- Coir – Natural fiber
- Expanded clay aggregate – Lightweight aggregate made by heating clay at high temperature in a rotary kiln
- Fireproofing – Rendering an object resistant to fire
- Firestop – Seal around openings in a fire-resistance-rated wall or floor
- List of minerals
- Passive fire protection – Component or system to passively prevent the spread of fire
- Perlite – Amorphous volcanic glass
- Plaster – Broad range of building and sculpture materials
- Sodium silicate – Hygroscopic chemical compound of variable Na2O/SiO2 ratio precursor of waterglass
- Sphagnum – Genus of mosses, peat moss
- Square foot gardening – Method of divided garden beds
