= Illite =

Group of non-expanding clay minerals

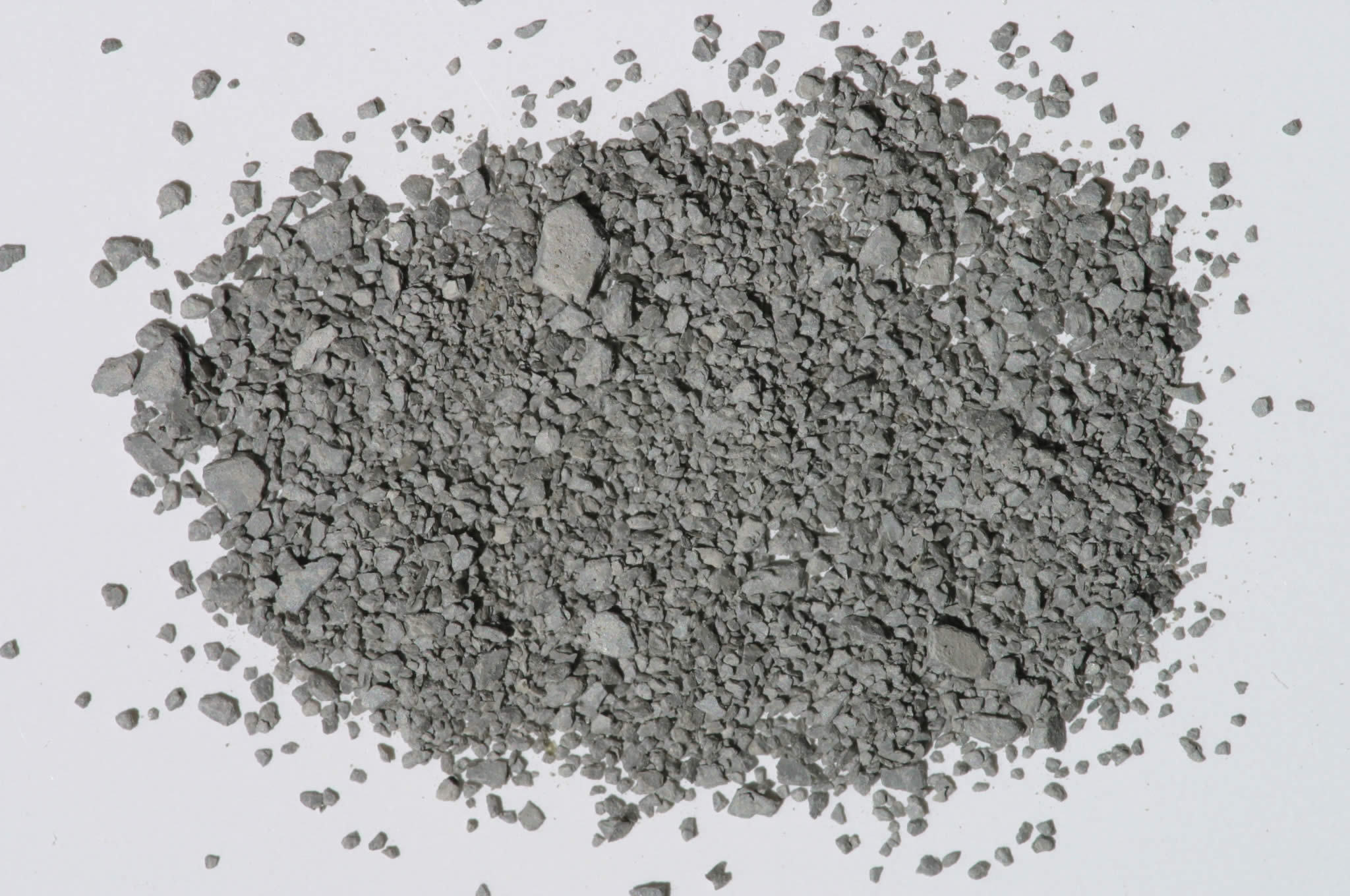

General
- Category: Phyllosilicate minerals
- Group: Mica group, dioctahedral mica group
- Formula: (K,H_{3}O)(Al,Mg,Fe)_{2}(Si,Al)_{4}O_{10}[(OH)_{2},(H_{2}O)]
- IMA symbol: Ilt
- IMA status: Variety of muscovite
- Strunz classification: 9.EC.60
- Dana classification: 71.02.02d.02
- Crystal system: Monoclinic
- Crystal class: Prismatic (2/m) (same H-M symbol)
- Space group: C2/m (no. 12)

Identification
- Color: Grey-white to silvery-white, greenish-gray
- Crystal habit: Micaceous aggregates
- Cleavage: {001} Perfect
- Mohs scale hardness: 1–2
- Luster: Pearly to dull
- Streak: white
- Diaphaneity: Translucent
- Specific gravity: 2.6–2.9
- Optical properties: Biaxial (−)
- Refractive index: nα = 1.535 – 1.570 nβ = 1.555 – 1.600 nγ = 1.565 – 1.605

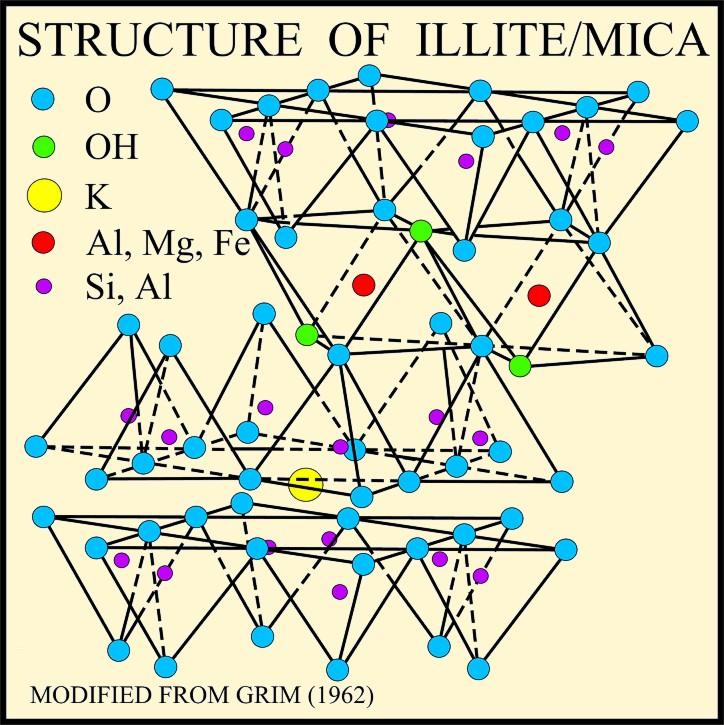
Structure of illite mica – USGS

Illite, also called hydromica or hydromuscovite, is a group of closely related non-expanding clay minerals. Illite is a secondary mineral precipitate, and an example of a phyllosilicate, or layered alumino-silicate. Its structure is a 2:1 sandwich of silica tetrahedron (T) – alumina octahedron (O) – silica tetrahedron (T) layers. The space between this T-O-T sequence of layers is occupied by poorly hydrated potassium cations which are responsible for the absence of swelling. Structurally, illite is quite similar to muscovite with slightly more silicon, magnesium, iron, and water and slightly less tetrahedral aluminium and interlayer potassium. The chemical formula is given as (K,H_{3}O)(Al,Mg,Fe)_{2}(Si,Al)_{4}O_{10}[(OH)_{2}·(H_{2}O)], but there is considerable ion (isomorphic) substitution. It occurs as aggregates of small monoclinic grey to white crystals. Due to the small size, positive identification usually requires x-ray diffraction or SEM-EDS (automated mineralogy) analysis. Illite occurs as an altered product of muscovite and feldspar in weathering and hydrothermal environments; it may be a component of sericite. It is common in sediments, soils, and argillaceous sedimentary rocks as well as in some low grade metamorphic rocks. The iron-rich member of the illite group, glauconite, in sediments can be differentiated by x-ray analysis.

The cation-exchange capacity (CEC) of illite is smaller than that of smectite but higher than that of kaolinite, typically around 20 – 30 meq/100 g.

Illite was first described for occurrences in the Maquoketa shale in Calhoun County, Illinois, US, in 1937. The name was derived from its type location in Illinois.

Brammallite is a sodium rich analogue. Avalite is a chromium bearing variety which has been described from Mt. Avala, Belgrade, Serbia.

Zipao 'jade' is an ornamental form of illite showing bands of red-purple and pale yellow-green. It may be carved into pendants and other ornaments.

== Illite crystallinity ==
The crystallinity of illite has been used as an indicator of metamorphic grade in clay-bearing rocks metamorphosed under conditions between diagenesis and low-grade metamorphism. With increasing temperature, illite is thought to undergo a transformation into muscovite.
