= Garnierite =

Nickel phyllosilicate of the serpentine group

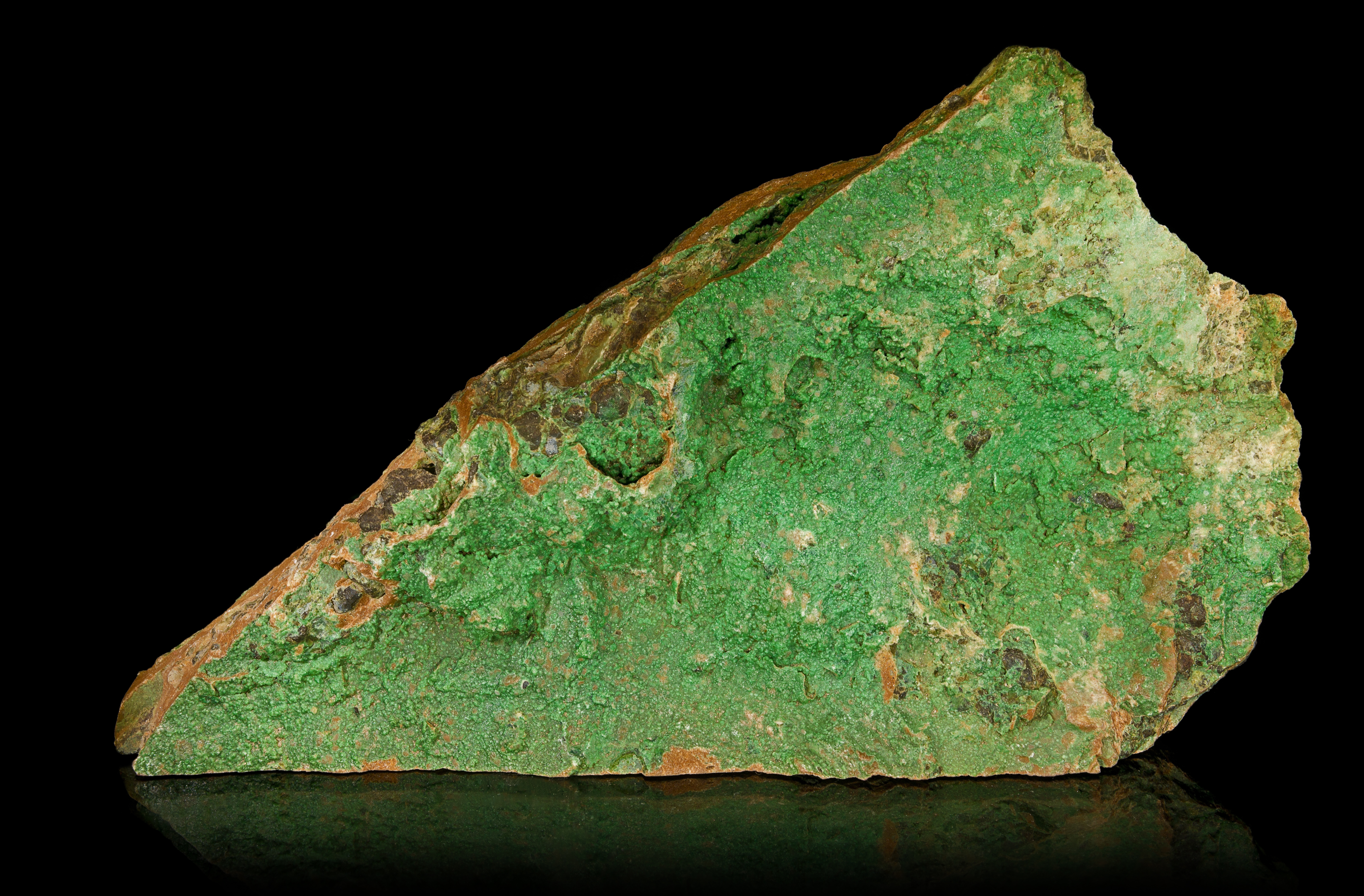
Garnierite

Garnierite is a general name for a green nickel ore which is found in pockets and veins within weathered and serpentinized ultramafic rocks. It forms through lateritic weathering of ultramafic rocks and occurs in many nickel laterite deposits worldwide. It is an important nickel ore, having a large weight percent NiO. As garnierite is not a valid mineral name according to the Commission on New Minerals, Nomenclature and Classification (CNMNC), no definite composition or formula has been universally adopted. Some of the proposed compositions are all hydrous Ni-Mg silicates, a general name for the Ni-Mg hydrosilicates which usually occur as an intimate mixture and commonly includes two or more of the following minerals: serpentine, talc, sepiolite, smectite, or chlorite, and Ni-Mg silicates, with or without alumina, that have X-ray diffraction patterns typical of serpentine, talc, sepiolite, chlorite, vermiculite or some mixture of them all.

== Composition ==
Various studies have examined the composition of garnierite. In 1964, a study was done on the composition of a talc-like garnierite and found the composition to be close to the compositions of stevensite and sepiolite, but with partial replacement of the Mg content by Ni. In 1973, another study found that chemical analysis of garnierite samples yields non-stoichiometric formulae that can be reduced to formulas like those of talc and serpentine. The authors suggested a talc monohydrate formula of (Mg,Ni)_{3}Si_{4}O_{10}(OH)_{2}·H_{2}O for the talc-like garnierite. A third study found Mg, Si, Fe, Ni and Al in the samples studied. The author determined that the compositions of all his garnierite samples lie between the serpentine and sepiolite solid solution series. In 2008, yet another study used X-ray diffraction to find the composition of garnierite samples collected at the Falcondo mine in the Dominican Republic. It found that each of the specimens analyzed fell into one of three groups: an Ni-talc to willemseite (up to 25 weight percent Ni) group, an Ni-lizardite to nepouite (up to 34 weight percent Ni) group and an Ni-sepiolite to falcondoite (up to 24 weight percent Ni) group. In 2011, the most recent study performed used Extended X-ray Absorption Fine Structure (EXAFS) analysis to determine the composition of their garnierite samples. It found that garnierite has an almost complete solid solution between Ni-sepiolite and falcondoite, with samples analyzed showing between 3 and 77 percent falcondoite composition. According to X-ray and thermal analysis, the garnierites of the Ural deposits are multiphase formations and consist of a serpentinites (pecoraite 2McI, chrysotile 2McI, chrysotile 2OrcI, lisardite 6T, lisardite 1T, népouite – nickel lisardite 1T), chlorites (clinochlore IIB, sepiolite, palygorskite), clay minerals (nontronite, saponite, montmorillonite, vermiculite), minerals of the mica supergroup (talc, vilemsite, clintonite, annite, phlogopite) and quartz. Calcite, sauconite, beidellite, halloysite, thomsonite, goethite, maghemite, opal, moganite, nickel hexahydrite, accessory magnesiochromite and rivsite are among the sporadic minerals found in them.

== Structure ==
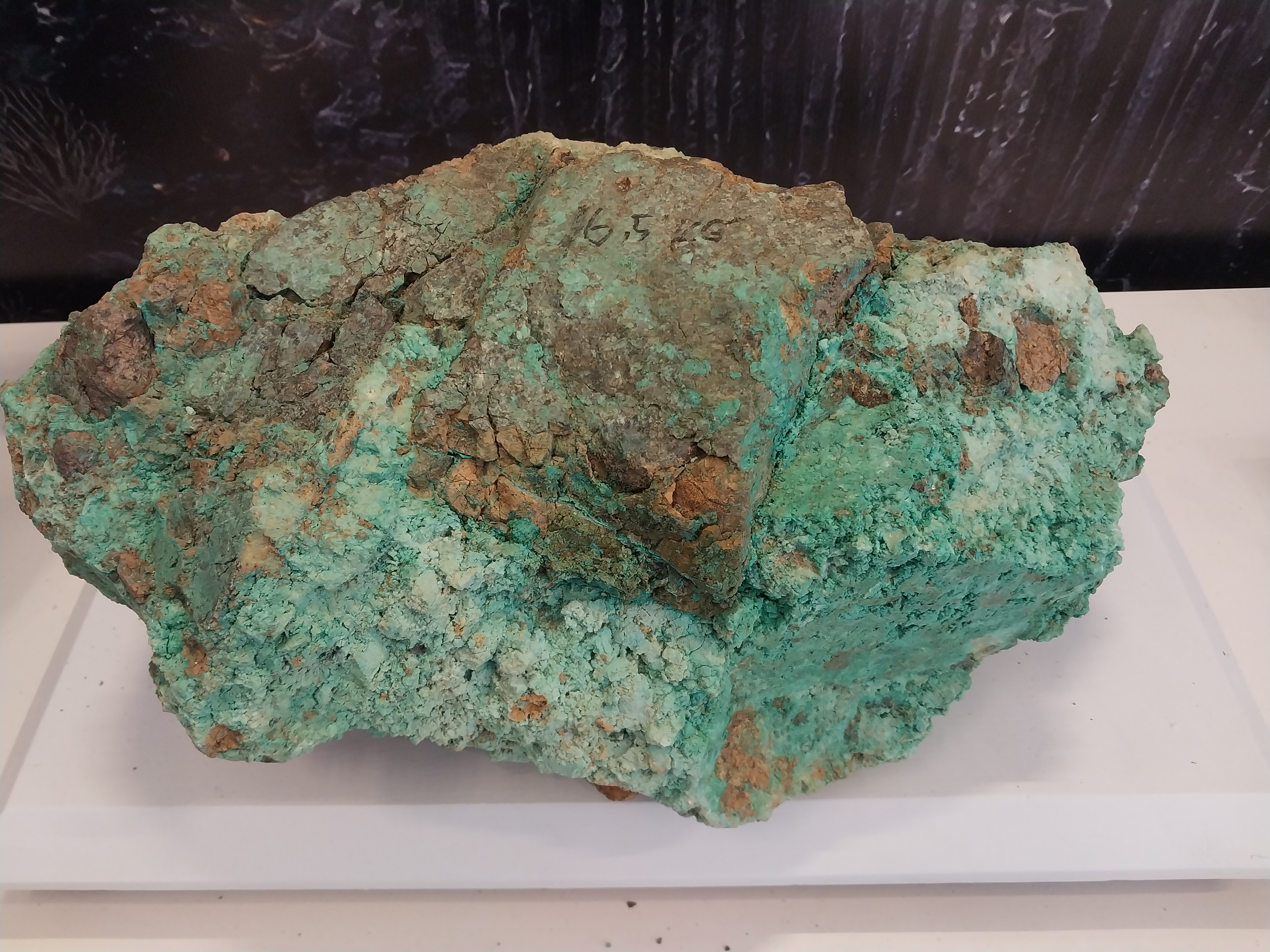
Garnierite from Sulawesi

Garnierite is generally a fine grained mineral with poor crystalline structure. The unit cell parameters, found using transmission electron microscopy (TEM) analysis, are 13.385(4), 26.955(9), 5.271(3) Å and 13.33(1), 27.03(2), 5.250(4) Å. The space group is Pncn.

Based on the ionic radii and charge alone, Ni^{2+} should easily substitute for Mg^{2+} in octahedral coordination. The fact that Ni readily substitutes for Mg in garnierite explains why as NiO content goes up, MgO content goes down. The nickel in garnierite is not evenly distributed throughout the structure, but is concentrated in small zones of nickel surrounded by magnesium zones.

Garnierite is a layer silicate. The main difference between the serpentine-like and talc-like variants of garnierite is the spacing between layers in the structure, seen in X-ray powder diffraction studies. The serpentine-like variants have 7 Å basal spacings while the talc-like variants have a basal spacing of 10 Å. At 10^{6} × magnifications, the 7 and 10 Å layer spacings (d(001)) are obvious and measureable, with the 7 Å spacings being better defined than the 10 Å spacings. 7 Å, serpentine-like minerals show rod and tube shaped particles, as well as platy particles and fluffy particles that are most likely aggregates while the 10 Å variety shows much less variation in particles, showing only platy and fluffy forms with very few tube or rod shaped particles. Some particles exhibit interstratification of 7 and 10 Å spacings. There is no correlation between NiO content and the shapes of the particles in the mineral. 7 Å type garnierites usually resemble chrysotile or lizardite in their structures, while 10 Å types usually resemble pimelite.

== Physical properties ==
Garnierite is a green mineral, ranging from light yellow-green to dark green. The color comes from the presence of nickel in the mineral structure for magnesium. Noumeaite (later determined to be a member of the garnierite family) varies in hardness, from soft and brittle to hard enough to carve into figurines and the like. Some species of garnierite stick to the tongue and dissolve readily in water or even on the tongue. Garnierite commonly has a colloform texture, typical of minerals that fill open spaces from a solution. In general, darker green garnierites have higher Ni content, higher specific gravity and higher mean index of refraction than lighter green garnierites, which most likely relates to the inclusion of more Ni in their crystalline structure. The specific gravity of garnierite ranges from approximately 2.5 to 3. The mean index of refraction of garnierite ranges from approximately 1.563 to 1.601.

== Geologic occurrence ==
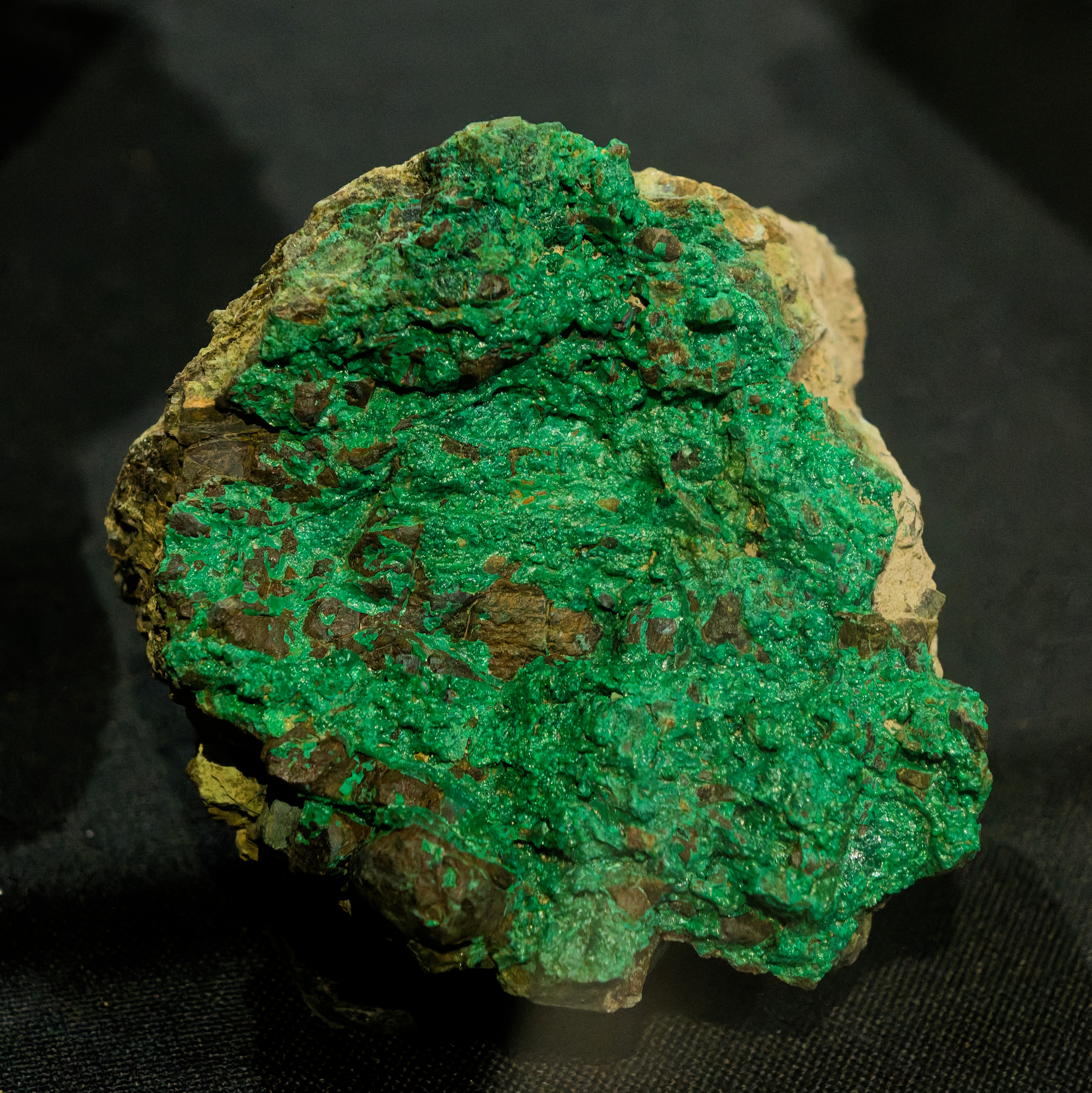
Garnierite from New Caledonia (Sorbonne University)

Light colored garnierite is an alteration of olivine-rich rock to a clay-like mineral poor in nickel, light green to bright green garnierite is a result of the leaching of manganese oxide, magnesium, nickel and iron from the original dark green garnierite, rich in nickel, which was deposited by groundwater. This leads to a very common occurrence of garnierite as fracture fillings of millimeter to centimeter thick veins or as a fabric or coatings at the Falcondo mine in the Dominican Republic. X-ray diffraction of samples from that mine show that garnierite veins include sepiolite-falcondoite and quartz (chrysoprase, a green variety of quartz with a nickel content of less than 2 weight %). Breccias found in faults at the Falcondo mine contain garnierite clasts cemented together by a secondary deposition of garnierite, which is evidence of syn-tectonic deposition of garnierite. In the garnierite deposits near Riddle, Oregon, garnierite is found as a weathering product of the underlying peridotite, with the garnierite layer between 50 and 200 ft (15 and 61 m) thick.

== Origin of the name ==
Jules Garnier, a French geologist, published his work on the geology of New Caledonia in 1867, announcing the discovery of nickel there. Garnierite was named for Jules Garnier in a paper by Archibald Liversidge in 1874. When Liversidge sent a copy of his paper to Garnier, Garnier replied that the new mineral noumeite being described in the paper sounded very much like a mineral he had described in his 1869 paper. Liversidge decided to name the new mineral garnierite in honor of Garnier and gave the name noumeaite to a second mineral found in the same general area in New Caledonia.

== See also ==
- List of minerals
- List of minerals named after people
