= Pimelite =

Nickel-rich smectite deprecated as mineral species in 2006

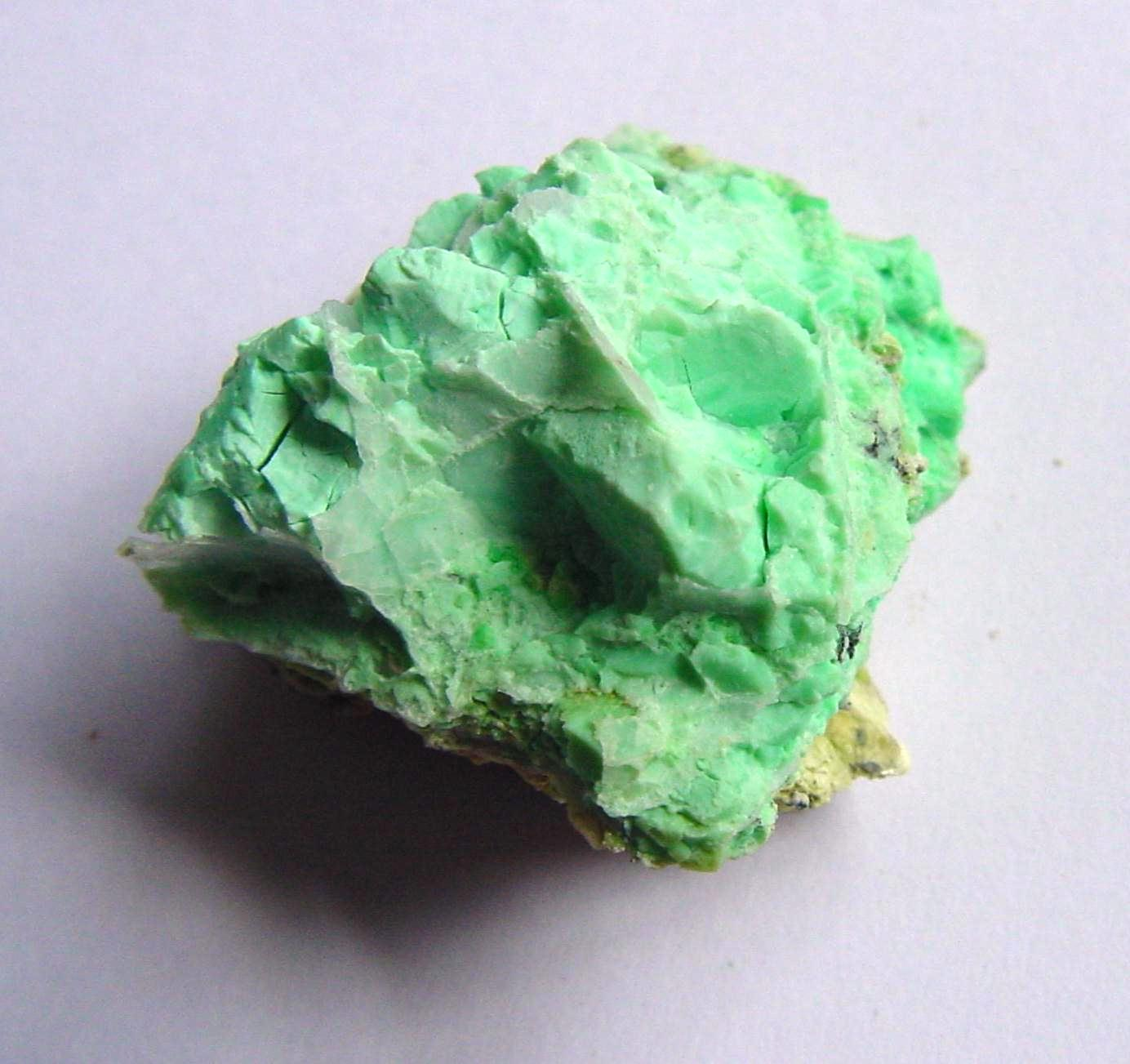
- Pimelite from Szklary, Lower Silesia, Poland. Specimen size 2.3 cm (0.9 in)

General
- Category: Phyllosilicate minerals
- Formula: Ni_{3}Si_{4}O_{10}(OH)_{2}·4H_{2}O
- Strunz classification: 8/H.09-65 (8 ed)
- Dana classification: 71.3.1b.5
- Crystal system: Hexagonal; Unknown space group

Identification
- Formula mass: 554.5 g/mol
- Color: Bright green, apple green, yellow-green
- Crystal habit: Fine-grained, also fibrous
- Cleavage: None
- Fracture: Uneven to conchoidal
- Mohs scale hardness: 2.0–2.5
- Luster: Waxy
- Streak: White
- Diaphaneity: Translucent
- Specific gravity: 2.23–2.98
- Optical properties: Biaxial (−); Can appear isotropic due to fine grain size
- Refractive index: N_{x} = 1.592; N_{y} = 1.615
- Pleochroism: Pale green, colourless to light yellow green
- Solubility: Decomposed by acids
- Other characteristics: Neither radioactive nor fluorescent Expands to 17.35 A using glycol Nonmagnetic

Pimelite was discredited as a mineral species by the International Mineralogical Association (IMA) in 2006, in an article which suggests that "pimelite" specimens are probably willemseite (which is approved), or kerolite (which is also discredited). This was a mass discreditation, and not based on any re-examination of the type material (assuming any exists). Nevertheless, a considerable number of papers have been written, verifying that pimelite is a nickel-dominant smectite. It is always possible to redefine a mineral wrongly discredited.

The mineral was erroneously assumed to be a nickel-rich talc in a paper published in the American Mineralogist in 1979, but it had already been determined to be a smectite as early as 1938, and this was confirmed in another article in the American Mineralogist in 1966. Both nickel-bearing talc and nickel dominant smectite occur at the type locality, Szklary, Ząbkowice County, Lower Silesia, Poland.

== Mineral group ==
According to the literature pimelite belongs to the smectite group, trioctahedral subgroup. "Smectite" is the name of a group of minerals, not the name of a mineral species.

Subgroup members:

- hectorite (IMA questionable status) Na_{0.3}(Mg,Li)_{3}Si_{4}O_{10}(OH)_{2}
- pimelite (IMA discredited) Ni_{3}Si_{4}O_{10}(OH)_{2}·4H_{2}O
- saponite (Ca,Na)_{0.3}(Mg,Fe^{2+})_{3}(Si,Al)_{4}O_{10}(OH)_{2}·4H_{2}O
- sauconite Na_{0.3}Zn_{3}(Si,Al)_{4}O_{10}(OH)_{2}·4H_{2}O
- stevensite (IMA questionable status) (Ca_{0.5},Na)_{0.33}(Mg,Fe^{2+})_{3}Si_{4}O_{10}(OH)_{2}·n(H_{2}O)
- yakhontovite (Ca,Na,K)_{0.2}(Cu,Fe,Mg)_{2}Si_{4}O_{10}(OH)_{2}·3H_{2}O
- zincsilite Zn_{3}Si_{4}O_{10}(OH)_{2}·4H_{2}O

Smectite group minerals are phyllosilicate clay minerals. Pimelite apparently constitutes part of the mixtures called garnierite or noumeite, and it could form a series with stevensite or saponite.

== Discovery ==
Pimelite was discovered in 1788 by Martin Heinrich Klaproth, and renamed in 1800 by Dietrich Ludwig Gustav Karsten (de:Dietrich Ludwig Gustav Karsten) from the Greek word for fat, in allusion to the appearance.

== Structure ==
It belongs to the hexagonal crystal system, but the crystal class is unknown. As with all phyllosilicates, the basic structural element is a triple layer, called a t-o-t layer, where "t" stands for a tetrahedral sheet and "o" stands for an octahedral sheet. The tetrahedral sheets comprise (Si,Al)O_{4} tetrahedra, linked together in nearly hexagonal rings. Three of the oxygens in each tetrahedron form links to other tetrahedra in the sheet, and the fourth oxygen, the apical oxygen, points away from the sheet. The apical oxygens of one tetahedral sheet face the apical oxygens of the other tetrahedral sheet, forming octahedral sites between the sheets, and this is the octahedral "o" layer. The octahedral sites may be fully occupied by divalent cations, producing trioctahedral layers, where each O or OH ion is surrounded by 3 divalent cations. Alternatively the octahedral sites may be 2/3 occupied by trivalent cations, producing dioctahedral layers, where each O or OH ion is surrounded by 2 trivalent cations. There is one formula unit per unit cell (Z = 1), and the unit cell parameters are a = 5.256 Å and c = 14.822 Å. When treated with glycol the cell expands to 17.35 Å.

== Appearance ==
Pimelite does not form visible crystals. It is fine-grained or fibrous, with the apple green color typical of nickel compounds. It is translucent, with a white streak and a waxy luster.

== Optical properties ==
It is biaxial (−) but it can appear isotropic due to its fine grain size. The refractive indices are N_{x} = 1.592 and N_{y} = 1.615. It is pleochroic, pale green, and colorless to light yellow green. It is not fluorescent.

== Physical properties ==
Pimelite breaks with an uneven to conchoidal fracture, but it shows no cleavage. It is soft with Mohs hardness 2 to 2.5, similar to that of gypsum, and its specific gravity is 2.23 to 2.98. It is neither radioactive nor magnetic. It is decomposed by acids.

== Occurrence ==
Pimelite is found in lateritic nickel ore deposits above serpentinites or dunites, frequently mixed with nickel-rich serpentine minerals or quartz. The type locality is Kosemutz, near Frankenstein, Silesia, Poland, and it has also been found in New Jersey, US. A nickel silicate hydroxide mineral was first described from Franklin, New Jersey, in 1889, but it has not been reported from the neighbouring Sterling Hill. It was originally called desaulesite, for Major de Saules, manager of the Trotter Mine at Franklin, but that name is now used for zinc-rich garnierite. In 1966 the material was shown to be identical with pimelite. Pimelite from the Trotter Shaft occurs as localized, patchy, thin crusts and dense 1 to 6 cm masses as an alteration product of nickel arsenides. It is a secondary, low-temperature mineral, associated with annabergite, fluorite, baryte and sphalerite.
