= Népouite =

Phyllosilicate mineral in the serpentine subgroup

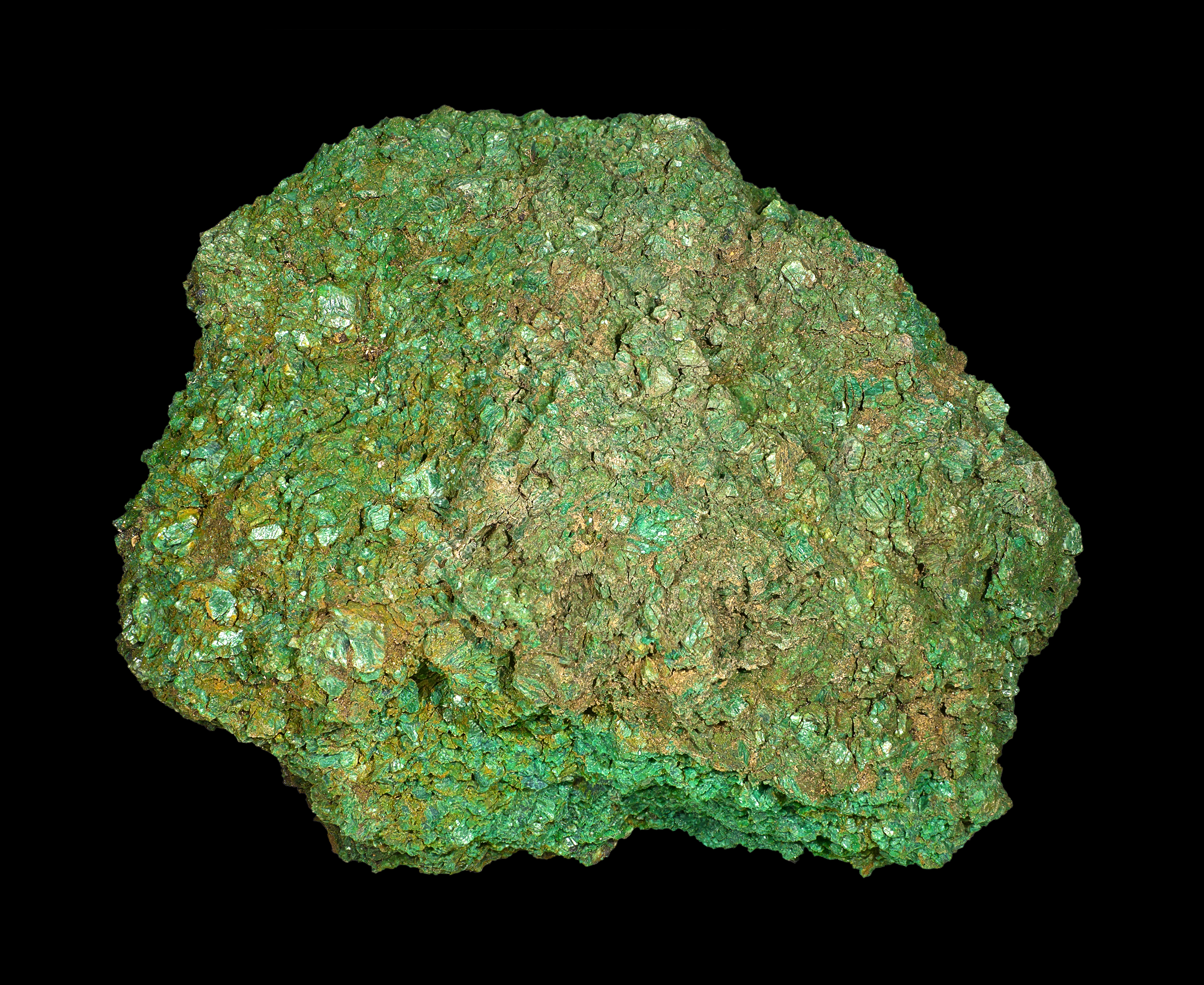
- Népouite from the Népoui Mine, North Province, New Caledonia. Specimen size: 21 cm.

General
- Category: Phyllosilicate minerals
- Group: Kaolinite-Serpentine group, serpentine subgroup
- Formula: Ni_{3}(Si_{2}O_{5})(OH)_{4}
- IMA symbol: Npo
- Strunz classification: 9.ED.15
- Dana classification: 71.1.2b.3
- Crystal system: Orthorhombic
- Crystal class: pyramidal (mm2) (same H-M symbol)
- Space group: Ccm2_{1} (no. 36)

Identification
- Color: bright green (typical of nickel bearing silicates) to yellowish or brownish green, depending on nickel content
- Crystal habit: generally massive, also fibrous and microscopic pseudohexagonal platy crystals
- Cleavage: perfect on {001}
- Mohs scale hardness: 2 to 2 1/2
- Luster: earthy to waxy, also pearly
- Streak: greenish white
- Diaphaneity: semitranslucent
- Specific gravity: 3.18 to 3.24 (measured)
- Optical properties: biaxial (−)
- Refractive index: n_{α} = 1.600 – 1.630 n_{γ} = 1.635 – 1.650
- Birefringence: 0.035
- Pleochroism: weak. X = green to yellow green Z = yellow-green

Népouite is a rare nickel silicate mineral which has the apple green color typical of such compounds. It was named by the French mining engineer Edouard Glasser in 1907 after the place where it was first described (the type locality), the Népoui Mine, Népoui, Poya Commune, North Province, New Caledonia. The ideal formula is Ni_{3}(Si_{2}O_{5})(OH)_{4}, but most specimens contain some magnesium, and (Ni,Mg)_{3}(Si_{2}O_{5})(OH)_{4} is more realistic. There is a similar mineral called lizardite (named after the Lizard Complex in Cornwall, England) in which all of the nickel is replaced by magnesium, formula Mg_{3}(Si_{2}O_{5})(OH)_{4}. These two minerals form a series; intermediate compositions are possible, with varying proportions of nickel to magnesium.

Pecoraite is another rare mineral with the same chemical formula as népouite, but a different structure; such minerals are said to be dimorphs of each other, in the same way as graphite is a dimorph of diamond. Népouite, lizardite and pecoraite are all members of the kaolinite-serpentine group.

Garnierite is a green nickel ore that formed as a result of weathering of ultramafic rocks, and that occurs in many nickel deposits worldwide. It is a mixture of various nickel and magnesium phyllosilicates, including népouite. Associated minerals include calcite, chlorite, goethite, halloysite, nontronite, pimelite, quartz, sepiolite, serpentine, talc and willemseite.

As well as the type locality in New Caledonia, it is present in Australia, Austria, the Czech Republic, the Democratic Republic of Congo, Germany, Greece, Italy, Japan, Morocco, Poland, Russia, South Africa and the United States.

== Structure ==
Space group Ccm2_{1}. Unit cell: a = 5.31 Å, b = 9.19 Å, c = 14.50 Å

X-ray powder diffraction data
d spacing	7.31	4.55	3.63	2.89	2.50	2.31	2.20	1.53
relative intensity	10	5	9	6	7	4	4	6

== See also ==
- Lizardite – Phyllosilicate mineral in the serpentine subgroup (Mg_{3}(Si_{2}O_{5})(OH)_{4})
- Pecoraite – Phyllosilicate mineral in the serpentine subgroup (Ni_{3}(Si_{2}O_{5})(OH)_{4})
- Antigorite – Phyllosilicate mineral in the serpentine subgroup ((Mg,Fe^{2+})_{3}(Si_{2}O_{5})(OH)_{4})
