= Mariana mud volcanoes =

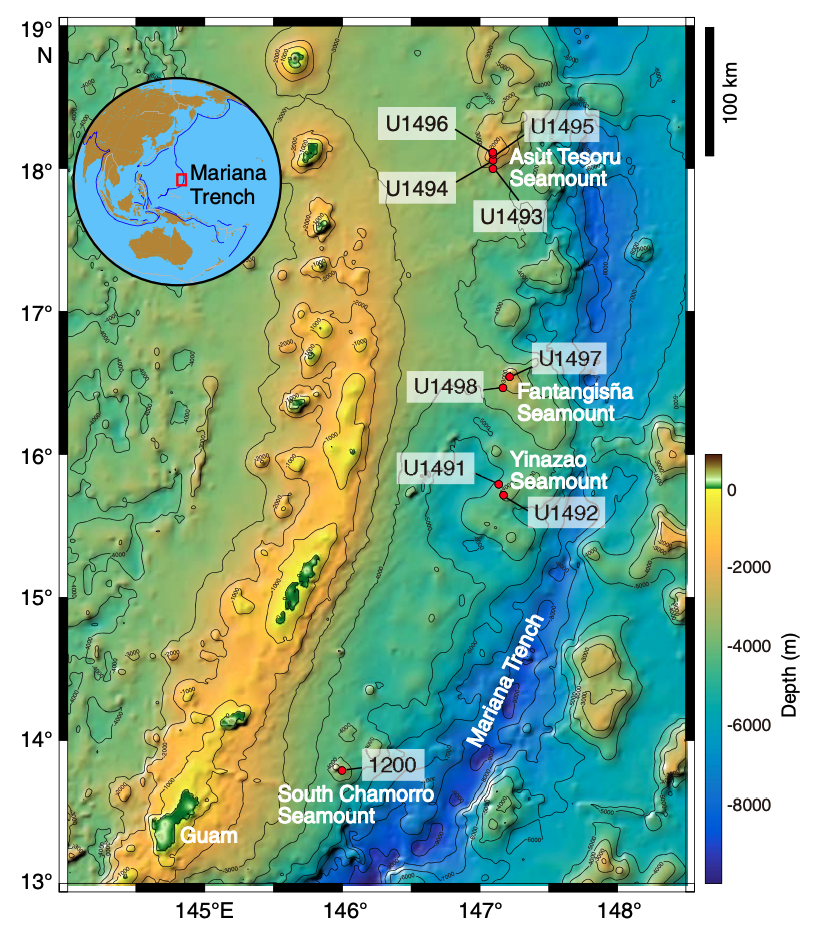
Map of serpentinite mud volcanoes from the Mariana fore-arc.

Mud volcanoes in the Mariana fore-arc are a hydrothermal geologic landform that erupt slurries of mud, water, and gas. There are at least 10 mud volcanoes in the Mariana fore-arc that are actively erupting, including the recently studied Conical, Yinazao, Fantagisna (informally known as Celestial seamount), Asut Tesoro (formerly Big Blue), and South Chamorro serpentinite mud volcanoes. These mud volcanoes erupt a unique serpentinite mud composition that is related to the geologic setting in which they have formed. Serpentinite mud is the product of mantle metasomatism due to subduction zone metamorphism and slab dehydration. As a result, the serpentinite mud that erupts from these mud volcanoes often contains pieces of mantle peridotite material that has not fully altered during the serpentinization process. In addition to pieces of altered mantle material, pieces of subducted seamounts (including corals) have also been found within the serpentinite muds. Serpentinite mud volcanoes in the Mariana fore-arc are often located above faults in the fore-arc crust. These faults act as conduits for the hydrated mantle material to ascend towards the surface. The Mariana mud volcanoes provide a direct window into the process of mantle hydration that leads to the production of arc magmas and volcanic eruptions.

== Geologic setting ==
A fore-arc lies between a volcanic arc and a trench, and is where no magma is being generated. Active igneous volcanism is occurring at the Mariana volcanic arc and the Marina fore-arc is located at the convergent margin between the Pacific and Philippine tectonic plates, where the Pacific plate is subducting beneath the Philippine plate. The Mariana system is part of the combined Izu-Bonin-Mariana subduction system that extends from Japan to the north to Palau in the south. Subduction began between 52-50 Ma during a period of tectonic plate reorganization in the western Pacific. The Mariana arc contains two volcanic arcs, one being the active arc and the other a remnant arc, which is an inactive volcanic arc, located further from the subduction zone. The remnant arc was left behind as the trench migrated westward ~6 Ma and from spreading of the back arc that formed the Mariana trough. This process resulted in the eastward migration of active volcanism, the formation of a new volcanic arc, and the eastward bow of the Mariana arc.

== Formation of serpentinite mud ==
As the Pacific plate sinks into the mantle, the pelagic sediments and hydrated basalts begin to dehydrate, which releases water and volatiles into the mantle beneath the Mariana arc. This mixture of water and volatiles interacts with the mantle peridotite material beneath the overriding Philippine plate. The Mariana fore-arc peridotite has a harzburgite composition, thus it contains mostly olivine and orthopyroxene (enstatite). The hydration of olivine (Mg_{2}SiO_{4}) and enstatite (MgSiO_{4}) in the mantle results in the formation of Mg-rich serpentine (Mg_{3}Si_{2}O_{5}(OH)_{4}) and brucite (Mg(OH)_{2}). This process is known as serpentinization. Serpentine is a mineral group, and includes the minerals antigorite, lizardite, and chrysotile, all of which share the same chemical composition but vary crystallographically.

=== Reactions ===
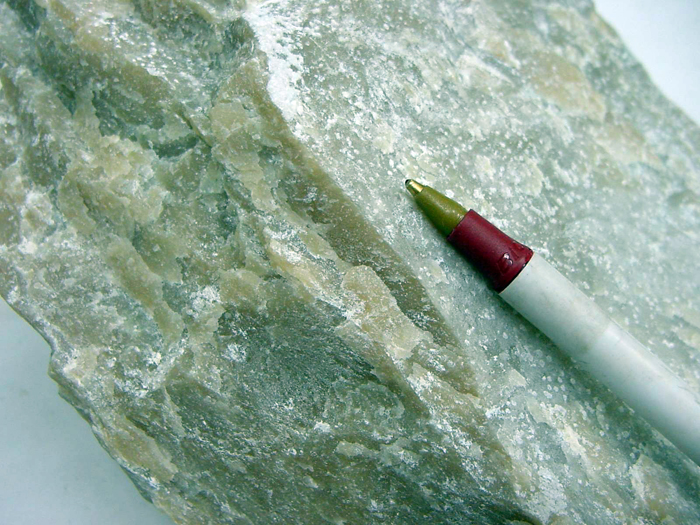
Brucite

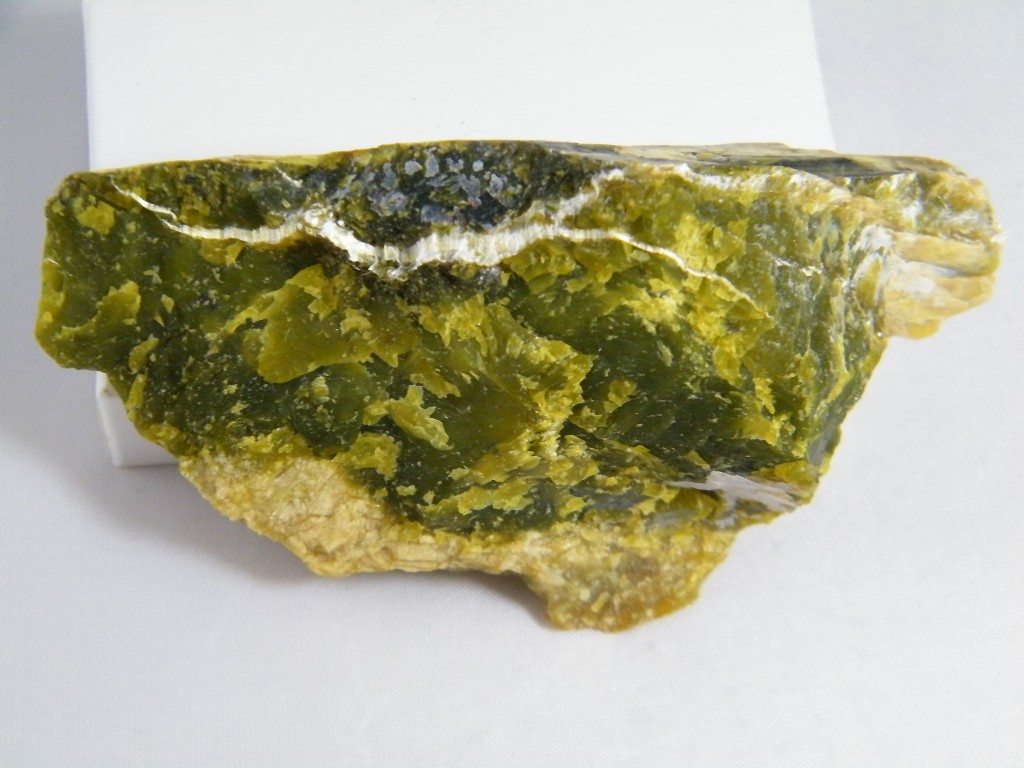
Lizardite (green) and Chrysotile (white) Serpentine.

(Olivine reaction): 2Mg_{2}SiO_{4} + 3H_{2}O ←→ Mg_{3}Si_{2}O_{5}(OH)_{4} + Mg(OH)_{2}

(Enstatite reaction): 6MgSiO_{3} + 3H_{2}O ←→ Mg_{3}Si_{2}O_{5}(OH)_{4} + Mg_{3}Si_{4}O_{10}(OH)_{2}

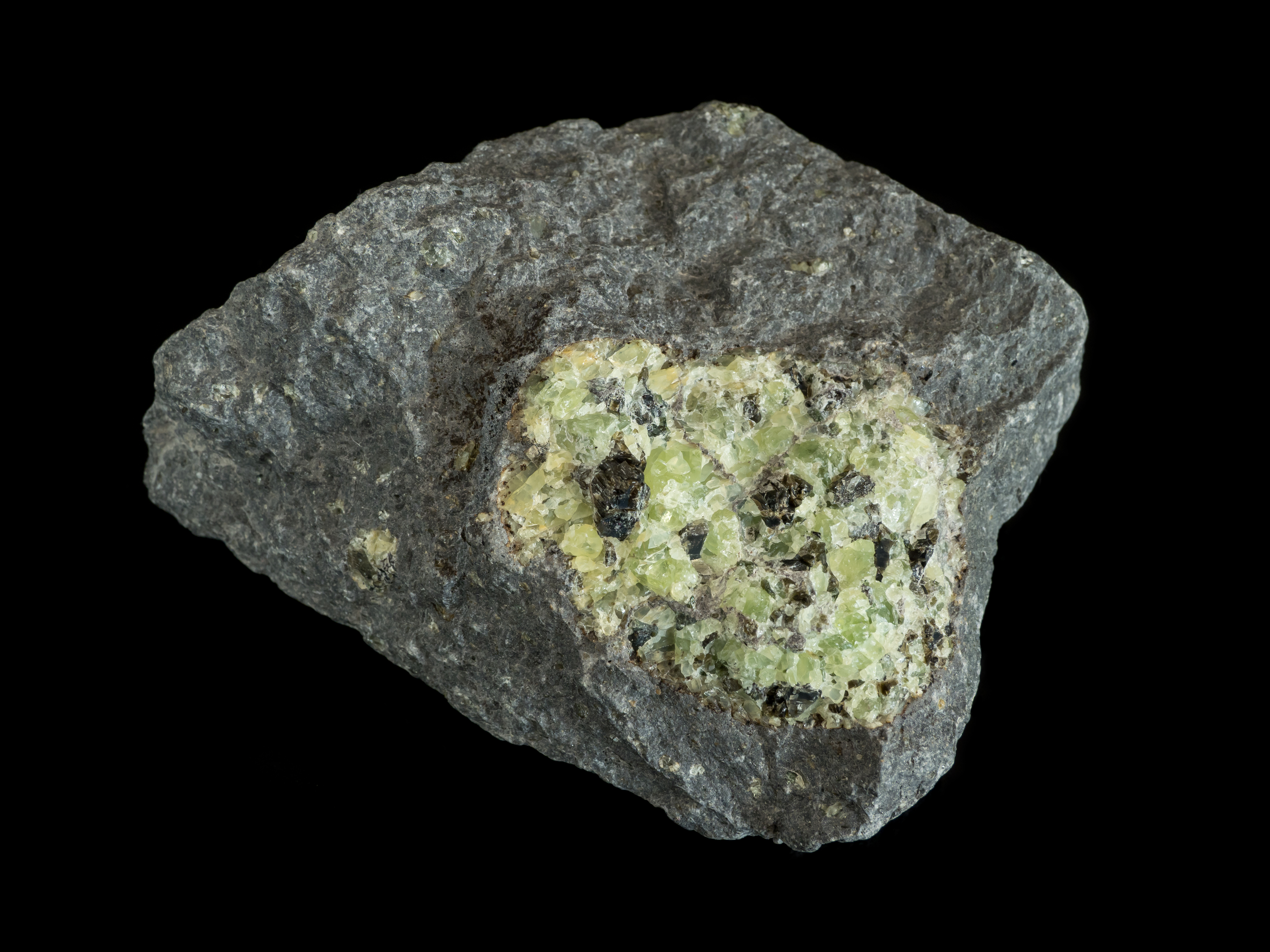
Olivine (green mineral cluster)

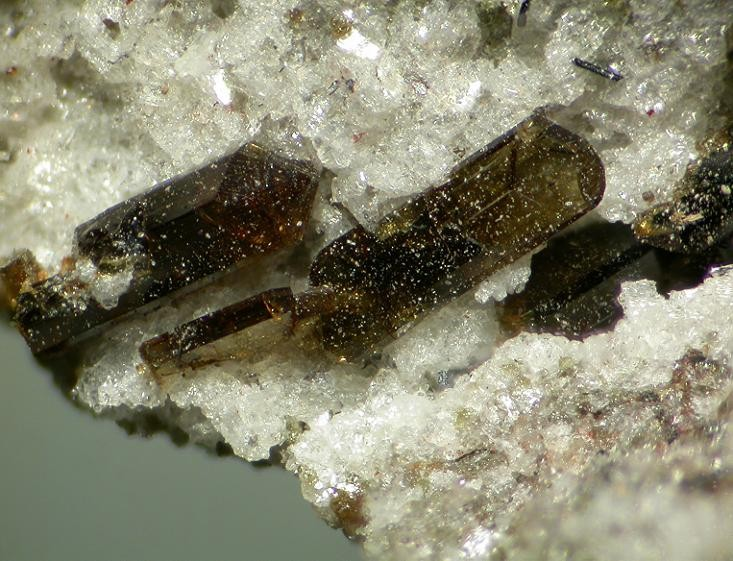
Enstatite (dark crystals in image)

(Olivine + Enstatite reaction): Mg_{2}SiO_{4} + MgSiO_{3} + 2H_{2}O ←→ Mg_{3}Si_{2}O_{5}(OH)_{4}

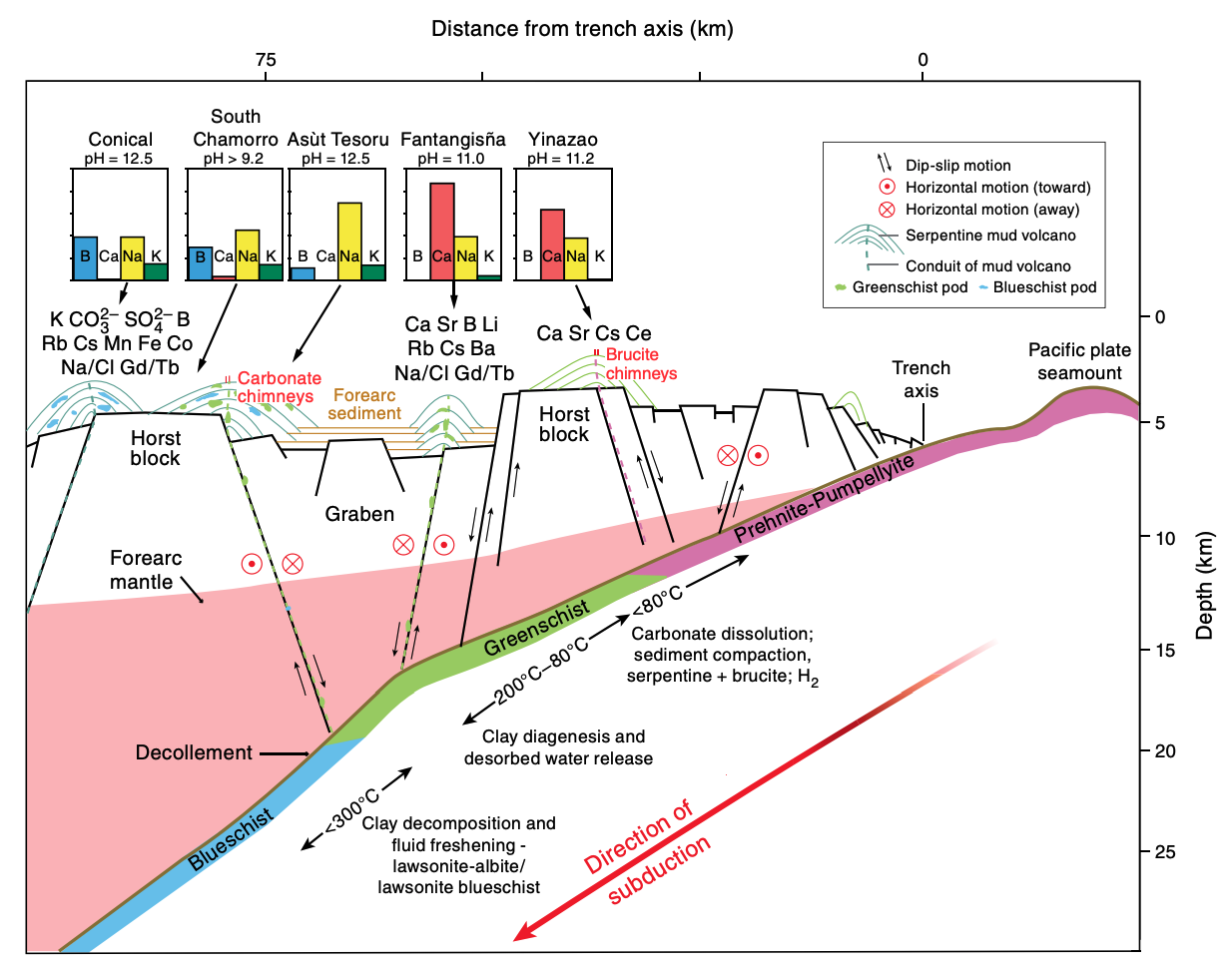
Schematic cross section of serpentinite mud volcanoes and how they source material from the subduction channel.

== Pore fluid chemistry ==
Pore fluid from the serpentinite mud volcanoes is water that contains a significant amount of dissolved H_{2}, CH_{4}, C_{2}H_{6} gases (volatiles). Trends in the H_{2} and CH_{4} concentrations within the pore fluids indicate that H_{2} production is driven by the serpentinization process, followed by abiotic (Fischer-Tropsch Type) CH_{4} production. Compared to seawater, the pore fluids from these serpentinite mud volcanoes have lower Cl, Ca, Mg, Sr, Li, and Si concentrations but higher pH, alkalinity, K, Na, Rb, Cs, and Ba content. The mud volcanoes closest to the trench (i.e., Yinazoa and Fantangisna) have elevated concentrations of Ca and Sr and low concentrations of K, Na, Cl, SO_{4}, and B in their pore fluid. In contrast, the pore fluids of mud volcanoes furthest from the trench (i.e., Asut Tesoru, Conical, and South Chamorro) have high pH values (up to 12.4), depleted concentrations of Ca and Sr, and elevated concentrations of K, Na, Cl, SO_{4}, and B. The fluid chemistry of Yinazao and Fantangisna are controlled by shallow subduction processes like diagenesis and opal dehydration, whereas the fluid chemistry of the Asut Tesoru is controlled by deeper subduction processes like decarbonation and clay mineral decomposition.
