= Falcondoite =

Phyllosilicate mineral

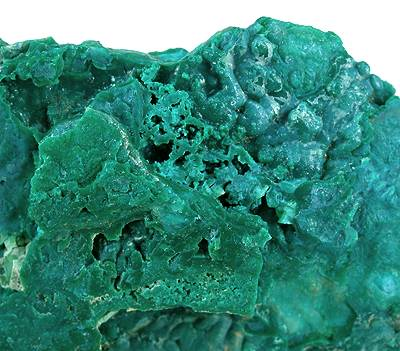
- Falcondoite specimen found in the Loma Peguera deposit

General
- Category: Phyllosilicate minerals
- Formula: (Ni,Mg)_{4}Si_{6}O_{15}(OH)_{2}·6H_{2}O
- IMA symbol: Fcd
- Strunz classification: 9.EE.25
- Crystal system: Orthorhombic
- Crystal class: Dipyramidal (2/m 2/m 2/m) (same H-M symbol)
- Space group: Pncn
- Unit cell: a = 13.5 Å, b = 26.9 Å c = 5.24 Å; α=90° = β=90° = γ=90°; Z = 4

Identification
- Color: Whitish-green
- Crystal habit: Fibrous and microscopic crystals
- Cleavage: Distinct
- Fracture: Friable
- Tenacity: Brittle
- Mohs scale hardness: 2 - 3
- Luster: Resinous
- Streak: White
- Diaphaneity: Translucent
- Specific gravity: 1.9
- Density: 1.9 g/cm^{3}
- Optical properties: Biaxial
- Birefringence: δ=0.01 - 0.02
- Dispersion: r < v strong
- Ultraviolet fluorescence: Non-fluorescent

Falcondoite, a member of the sepiolite group, was first discovered in the Dominican Republic, near the town of Bonao. The mineral was found in a deposit mined by Falconbridge Dominica, and so was named "falcondoite" after the company. Falcondoite is frequently associated with sepiolite, garnierite, talc, and serpentine, and is commonly nickel-bearing. While the chemical formula for falcondoite can vary, the mineral must contain more nickel than magnesium to be considered its own species. The ideal chemical formula for falcondoite is (Ni,Mg)_{4}Si_{6}O_{15}(OH)_{2}·6H_{2}O.

== Occurrence ==
Falcondoite occurs in an extensive deposit of laterite near the town of Bonao in the Dominican Republic. This deposit is part of a serpentinized harzburgite massif, which is composed of limonitic and serpentinitic ore. It's found in whitish-green veins of garnierite that is rich in sepiolite material. These veins are often only millimeters to centimeters thick, and can be formed by the infill of tension fractures. Some commonly associated minerals include sepiolite, garnierite, talc, and serpentine. While falcondoite is most closely associated to sepiolite, it's characterized by containing more nickel.

== Physical properties ==
Falcondoite is a whitish-green to green colored translucent mineral with a resinous luster and a white streak. It exhibits a hardness of 2–3 on the Mohs hardness scale. Falcondoite is a brittle and friable mineral with distinct cleavage. It occurs as aggregates of microscopic, fibrous crystals that are typically smaller than 10 μm in size, which have a refractive index of less than 1.55. Under cross-polarized light, these crystals experience extinction parallel or nearly parallel with positive elongation along the c-axis. The mineral has a measured density of 1.9 g/cm^{3} and a specific gravity of 1.9.

== Chemical properties ==
Falcondoite is considered to be a variety of clay-like, nickel-bearing hydrous silicate, which is a common component of garnierite mineralization. It is categorized as a phyllosilicate whose structure consists of single tetrahedral sheets of six-membered rings that are connected by octahedral sheets or bands. Falcondoite and sepiolite form a solid solution series of garnierite, with sepiolite being characterized as containing more magnesium, while falcondoite generally contains more nickel. Falcondoite's chemical formula can range from [Ni_{8}Si_{12}O_{30}(OH)_{4}(OH_{2})_{4}·8(H_{2}O)] to [(Ni_{4}Mg_{4})Si_{12}O_{30}(OH)_{4}(OH_{2})_{4}·8(H_{2}O)] with the weight percent of NiO being up to 38.03%. Some common impurities of falcondoite include aluminum, chromium, and iron.

== Chemical composition ==
Element	wt.%	Oxide	wt.%
Oxygen (O)	49.00%	SiO_{2}	48.00%
Nickel (Ni)	23.45%	NiO	29.84%
Silicon (Si)	22.44%	H_{2}O	16.79%
Magnesium (Mg)	3.24%	MgO	5.37%
Hydrogen (H)	1.88%		
Total:	100.01%	Total:	100%

== Crystallographic properties ==
Falcondoite is in the orthorhombic crystal system, with space group Pncn. The unit cell dimensions are a = 13.5 Å, b = 26.9 Å, c = 5.24 Å, and α = 90°, β = 90°, γ = 90°. The standard unit cell volume is equal to 1903 Å^{3}. Falcondoite is biaxial positive with a refractive index value of 1.55, and a birefringence of δ=0.01 - 0.02. X-ray diffraction analysis of falcondoite shows a pattern similar to that of sepiolite. Some of the measured peaks end up broadened possibly due to poor crystallinity, so accurate d-values were difficult to obtain.

Powder X-Ray Diffraction data:

d-spacing	Intensity
12.2 Å	100
9.8 Å	< 5 (talc)
7.5 Å	5
4.53 Å	10
4.30 Å	15
3.75 Å	10
3.33 Å	30 (+quartz)
3.19 Å	25
3.03 Å	< 5
2.80 Å	5
2.62 Å	30
2.53 Å	35 (broad)
2.44 Å	30
2.39 Å	20
2.26 Å	20
2.12 Å	5
2.07 Å	15
1.95 Å	< 5
1.87 Å	< 5

== See also ==
- List of minerals
