= Pecoraite =

Phyllosilicate mineral in the serpentine subgroup

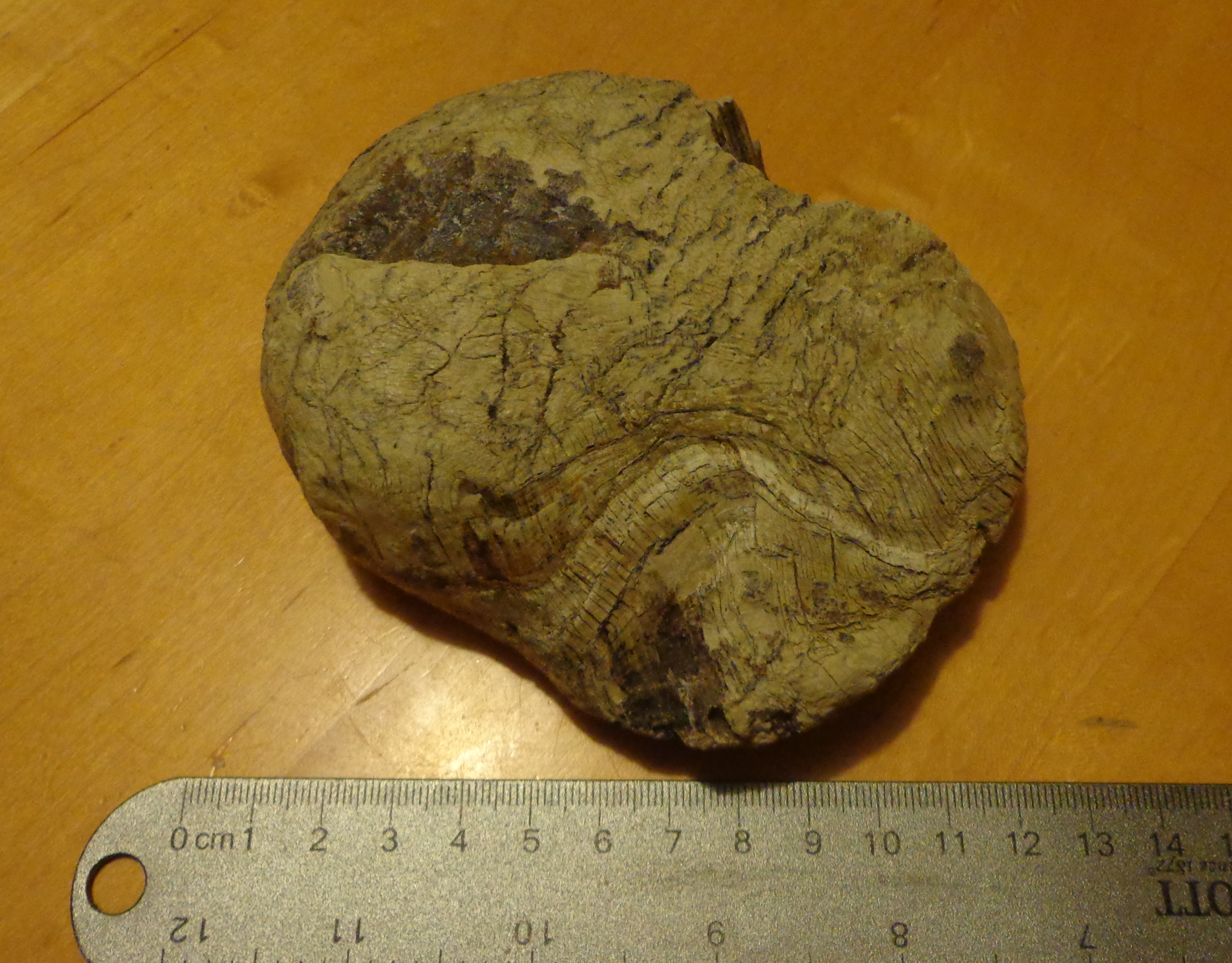
- Pecoraite from Eden, Vermont

General
- Category: Phyllosilicate minerals
- Group: Kaolinite-Serpentine group, serpentine subgroup
- Formula: Ni_{3}(Si_{2}O_{5})(OH)_{4}
- IMA symbol: Pco
- Strunz classification: 9.ED.15
- Crystal system: Monoclinic; Unknown space group

Identification
- Color: Green, blue-green yellow-green
- Mohs scale hardness: 2.5–3
- Luster: Waxy, earthy
- Streak: Pale green
- Specific gravity: 3.084

Pecoraite is a nickel silicate mineral and a member of the serpentine group. It was named after geologist William Thomas Pecora. It is monoclinic and has a chemical composition of Ni_{3}(Si_{2}O_{5})(OH)_{4}. It is associated with the weathering-and-or oxidation of meteorites or nickel sulfide minerals such as millerite. It is also found in altered ultramafic rocks. Pecoraite is typically a green, lime green, or bluegreen mineral with a waxy, or earthy luster and a mohs hardness of 2.5. Common textural habits associated with pecoraite are curved plates, spirals and tubes. It can also be granular and massive.

== See also ==
- Nepouite – Phyllosilicate mineral in the serpentine subgroup
