= Sauconite =

Phyllosilicate mineral in the smectite group

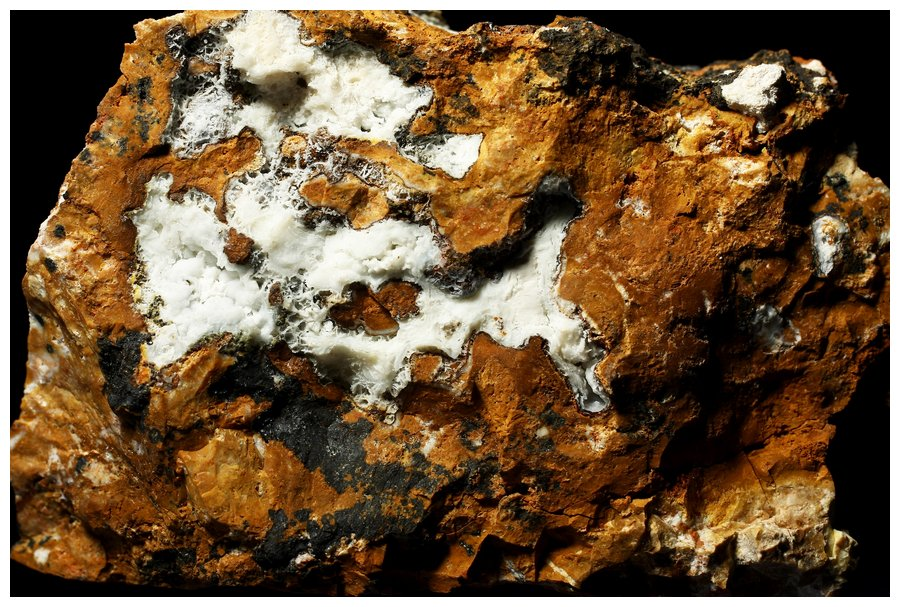
- Sauconite (reddish brown)

General
- Category: Phyllosilicate minerals
- Group: Smectite group
- Formula: Na_{0.3}Zn_{3}(SiAl)_{4}O_{10}(OH)_{2}·4H_{2}O
- IMA symbol: Sau
- Strunz classification: 9.EC.45
- Crystal system: Monoclinic
- Crystal class: Prismatic (2/m) (same H-M symbol)
- Space group: C2/m

Identification
- Color: Reddish brown, brown, brownish yellow, mottled
- Crystal habit: Clayey; as small micaceous plates in laminated to compact masses
- Cleavage: Perfect on {001}
- Mohs scale hardness: 1–2
- Luster: dull
- Diaphaneity: Translucent
- Specific gravity: 2.45
- Optical properties: Biaxial (−)
- Refractive index: n_{α} = 1.550 – 1.580 n_{β} = 1.590 – 1.620 n_{γ} = 1.590 – 1.620
- Birefringence: δ = 0.040
- Dispersion: r > v strong

Sauconite is a complex phyllosilicate mineral of the smectite clay group, formula Na_{0.3}Zn_{3}(SiAl)_{4}O_{10}(OH)_{2}·4H_{2}O. It forms soft earthy bluish white to red-brown monoclinic crystals typically massive to micaceous in habit. It has a Mohs hardness of 1 to 2 and a specific gravity of 2.45. Optically it is biaxial positive with refractive index values of n_{α} = 1.550 – 1.580, n_{β} = 1.590 – 1.620 and n_{γ} = 1.590 – 1.620. It is found in vugs and seams in the oxidized zones of zinc and copper deposits. It occurs in association with hemimorphite, smithsonite, chrysocolla, coronadite and various iron oxides.

It was named for the Saucon Valley in the Lehigh Valley region of eastern Pennsylvania, where it was originally discovered in 1875.
