= Stevensite =

Phyllosilicate mineral in the smectite group

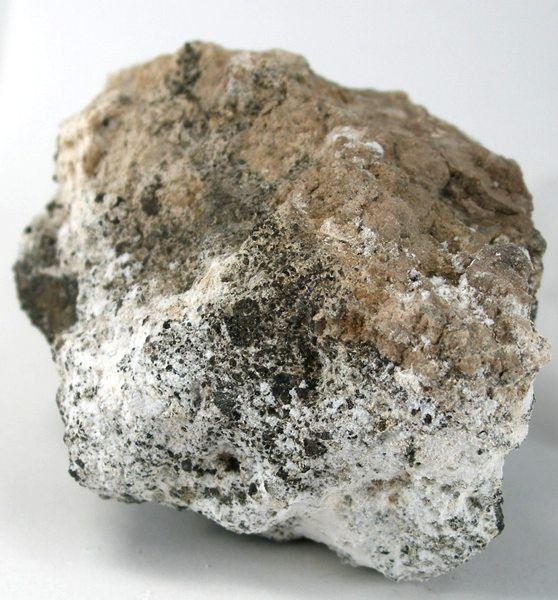

General
- Category: Phyllosilicate minerals
- Group: Smectite group
- IMA symbol: Stv

Identification
- Color: White, pale yellow, pale brown, pale pink
- Mohs scale hardness: 2 1/2
- Streak: White

Stevensite is a white clay mineral composed of hydrated calcium, sodium and magnesium silicate, with the chemical formula (Ca,Na)_{x}Mg_{3-x}(Si_{4}O_{10})(OH)_{2}. The mineral is a member of the smectite group (swelling clay). The mineral is named after Edwin Augustus Stevens.

Stevensite can be found at the Dean Quarry located on the east coast of the Lizard peninsula in Cornwall, England.
