= Lizardite =

Phyllosilicate mineral in the serpentine subgroup

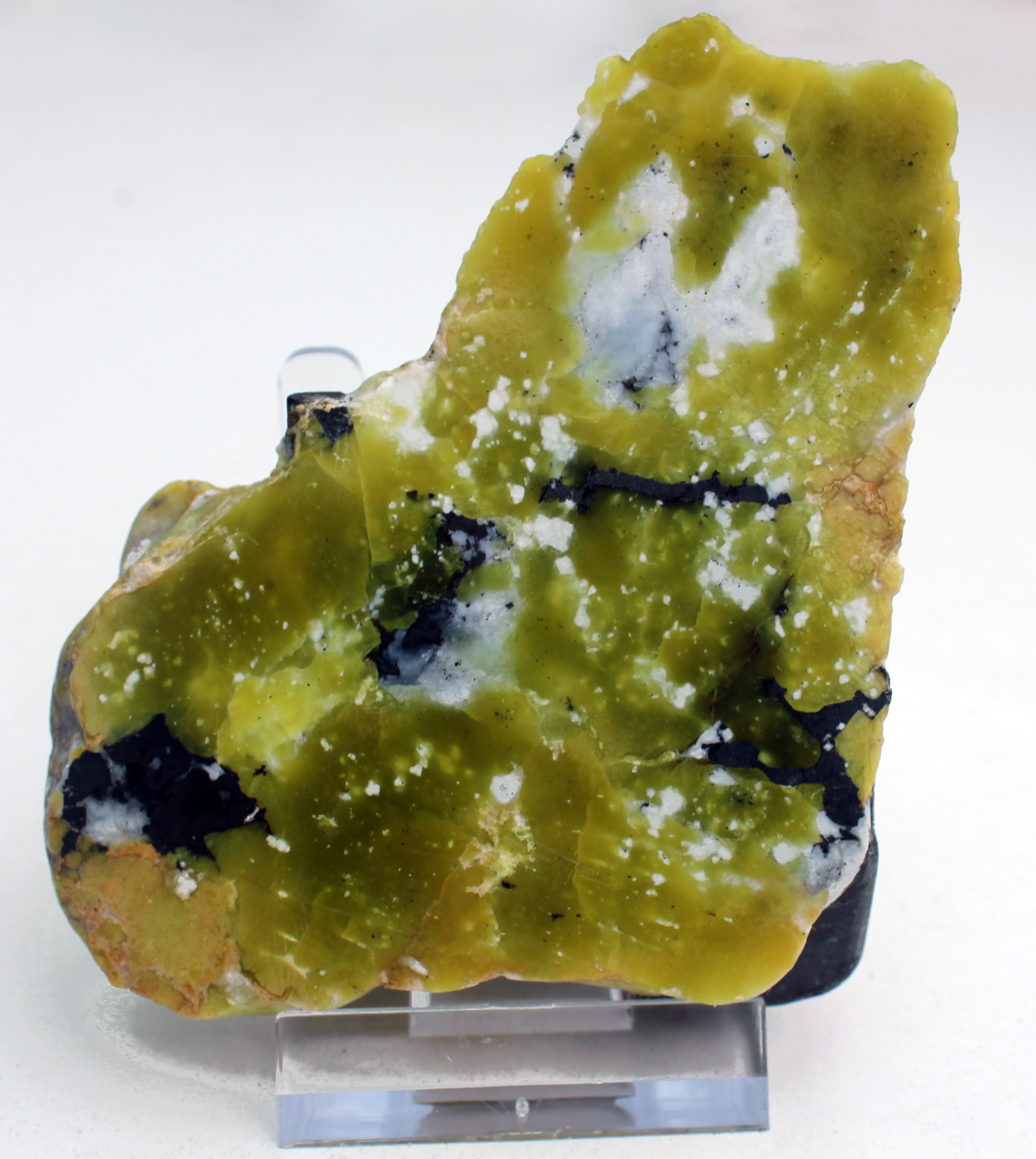

General
- Category: Phyllosilicate minerals
- Group: Kaolinite-Serpentine group, serpentine subgroup
- Formula: Mg_{3}(Si_{2}O_{5})(OH)_{4}
- IMA symbol: Lz
- Strunz classification: 9.ED.15
- Dana classification: 71.01.2b.02
- Crystal system: Trigonal

Identification
- Color: Green, red, purple, black, brown, light yellow to white
- Mohs scale hardness: 2.5
- Luster: Resinous, waxy, greasy
- Streak: White
- Specific gravity: 2.55

Lizardite is a mineral from the serpentine subgroup with formula Mg_{3}(Si_{2}O_{5})(OH)_{4}, and the most common type of mineral in the subgroup. It is also a member of the kaolinite-serpentine group.

Lizardite may form a solid-solution series with the nickel-bearing népouite (pure end-member: Ni_{3}(Si_{2}O_{5})(OH)_{4}). Intermediate compositions (Mg,Ni)_{3}(Si_{2}O_{5})(OH)_{4} are possible, with varying proportions of magnesium and nickel. However, the lizardite end-member is much more common than pure népouite, a relatively rare mineral most often formed by the alteration of ultramafic rocks.

Extremely fine-grained, scaly lizardite (also called orthoantigorite) comprises much of the serpentine present in "serpentine marbles". It is triclinic, has one direction of perfect cleavage, and may be white, yellow or green. Lizardite can be translucent or opaque, and have a soapy feel. It may be pseudomorphous after enstatite, olivine or pyroxene, in which case the name bastite is sometimes applied. Bastite may have a silky lustre.

== Name ==
Lizardite was named by Eric James William Whittaker and Jack Zussman in 1955 after the place it was first reported, the Lizard Peninsula, (from the Cornish: An Lysardh) in southern Cornwall, England, United Kingdom. (The Lizard complex includes many serpentine rocks as part of an exposed ophiolite.)

Scyelite is a synonym of lizardite.

== Characteristics ==
=== Chemistry ===
Antigorite and lizardite commonly coexist metastably; lizardite may also be able to turn into antigorite at over 350 degrees.

Lizardite contains H_{2}O in excess of the nominal formula, as does chrysotile. It has a high amount of Fe_{2}O_{3} and a low amount of FeO.

One study found that lizardite has a high amount of SiO_{2} and a low amount of Al_{2}O_{3}.

=== Formation ===
Lizardite is commonly a result from the hydrothermal metamorphism or retrograde metamorphism of mafic minerals such as olivine, pyroxene or amphibole, in ultrabasic rocks.

== Occurrence ==
=== Geological occurrence ===
Lizardite is commonly found in ophiolite and is often intergrown with brucite. It is also found with magnetite and the other serpentine minerals.

=== Locations found ===
==== Canada ====
As of 1989, only a single specimen of lizardite had been found in Mont-Saint-Hilaire, Quebec where it may occur in altered pegmatites.

==== United States ====
Lizardite can be found in the United States. In Pennsylvania It was discovered in the 1960s. With it being the most abundant mineral in Nottingham County Park. In Minnesota it can be found on the north shore of Lake Superior. In Montana, the Stillwater igneous complex is a prominent location for the mineral.

==== United Kingdom ====
Lizardite has a type locality at Lizard Peninsula, Cornwall, in the United Kingdom. It is found in green, red purple, brown and black form and used as both a semi-precious gemstone or for ornamental uses.

Scotland is a notable source of lizardite. Lizardite has been reported in Wales. At Holy Island, Anglesey lizardite has been found to be associated with antigorite.

==== South Africa ====
In the Frank Smith mine located in South Africa, lizardite was the dominant serpentine mineral. Orange lizardite has been found at the Wessels mine.

==== Other ====
It can also be found in Japan, Italy, and Australia.
