= Serpentine subgroup =

Subgroup of phyllosilicate minerals within the kaolinite-serpentine group

Serpentine
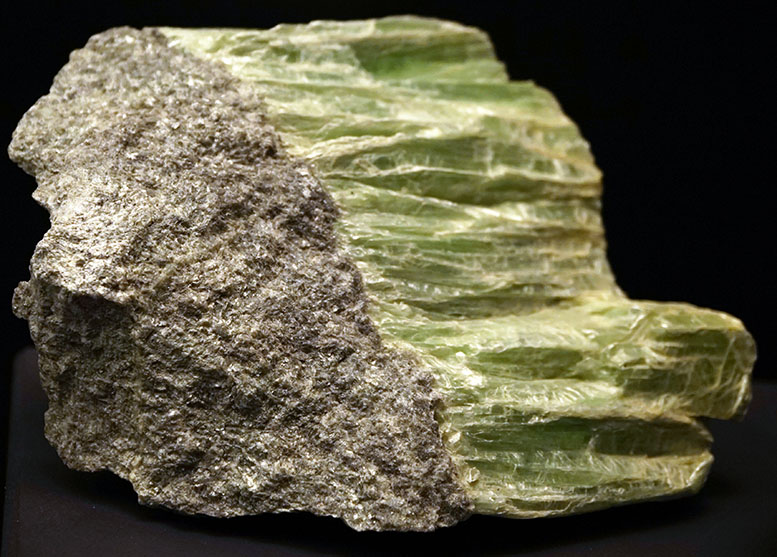

General
- Category: Phyllosilicate minerals
- Group: Kaolinite-Serpentine group
- Formula: X_{3}Si_{2}O_{5}(OH)_{4}, with X = Mg^{2+}, Fe^{2+}, Ni^{2+}, Mn^{2+}, Zn^{2+}
- IMA symbol: Srp
- Crystal system: Monoclinic

Identification
- Color: Green, yellowish-green, blueish-gray (antigorite); Green, brown, light yellow to white (lizardite); Greyish green to white (chrysotile)
- Cleavage: Almost perfect
- Tenacity: Brittle
- Mohs scale hardness: 2.5–6 (original) 3.5–4.0 (antigorite); 2.5 (lizardite); 2.5–3.0 (chrysotile)
- Luster: Vitreous, silky, greasy, waxy
- Streak: White, greenish-white
- Specific gravity: 2.2–2.9
- Optical properties: Biaxial (–)
- Refractive index: 1.538–1.57 (Tolerance:0.004/–0.07)
- Birefringence: 0.005–0.012
- Ultraviolet fluorescence: SWUV: inert to weak blue; LWUV: inert to weak green
- Diagnostic features: Color, cleavage

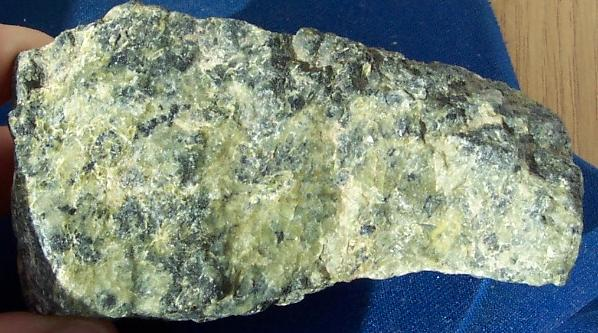
Serpentine from Poland

Serpentine subgroup (part of the kaolinite-serpentine group in the category of phyllosilicates) are greenish, brownish, or spotted minerals commonly found in serpentinite. They are used as a source of magnesium and asbestos, and as decorative stone. The name comes from the greenish color and smooth or scaly appearance from the Latin serpentinus, meaning "snake-like".

Serpentine subgroup is a set of common rock-forming hydrous magnesium iron phyllosilicate ((Mg,Fe)_{3}Si_{2}O_{5}(OH)_{4}) minerals, resulting from the metamorphism of the minerals that are contained in mafic to ultramafic rocks. They may contain minor amounts of other elements including chromium, manganese, cobalt or nickel. In mineralogy and gemology, serpentine may refer to any of the 20 varieties belonging to the serpentine subgroup. Owing to admixture, these varieties are not always easy to individualize, and distinctions are not usually made. There are three important mineral polymorphs of serpentine: antigorite, lizardite and chrysotile.

Serpentine minerals are polymorphous, meaning that they have the same chemical formulae, but the atoms are arranged into different structures, or crystal lattices. Chrysotile, which has a fibrous habit, is one polymorph of serpentine and is one of the more important asbestos minerals. Other polymorphs in the serpentine subgroup may have a platy habit. Antigorite and lizardite are the polymorphs with platy habit.

Many types of serpentine have been used for jewelry and hardstone carving, sometimes under the name "false jade" or "Teton jade".

== Properties and structure ==
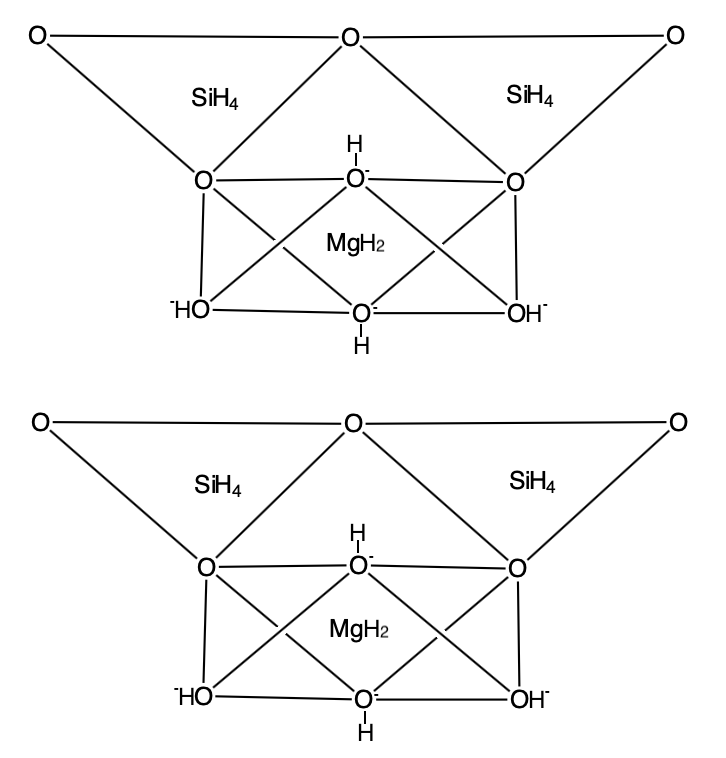
Stack of two serpentine basic structural unit: TO TO (silica tetrahedron, brucite octahedron) as sometimes schematically used to stylize its chemical composition.

Most serpentines are opaque to translucent, light (specific gravity between 2.2 and 2.9), soft (hardness 2.5–4), infusible and susceptible to acids. All are microcrystalline and massive in habit, never being found as single crystals. Lustre may be vitreous, silky or greasy. Colors range from white to grey, yellow to green, and brown to black, and are often splotchy or veined. Many are intergrown with other minerals, such as calcite and dolomite.

The basic structural unit of serpentine is a polar layer 0.72 nm thick. A Mg-rich trioctahedral sheet is tightly linked on one side to a single tetrahedral silicate sheet, regardless of the 3–5% larger lateral lattice dimensions of the octahedral sheet. The second level of the structure organized into different serpentine species originates partly to compensate the intra-layer stress due to this dimensional misfit. Good compensation results in a nearly constant layer curvature, with the larger octahedral sheet on the convex side. However, such curvature weakens the H-bonding between the layers. H-bonding tries to maintain flat layers, but this competes with the requirements of misfit compensation. As a result, the layers are locally either curved or flat. Antigorite, lizardite and chrysotile have the same chemical composition, but their different layer of curvatures result in lamellar agglomerated antigorite and lizardite and fibrous chrysotile elongated mineral particles.

== Occurrence ==
Serpentine minerals are ubiquitous in many geological systems where hydrothermal alteration of ultramafic rocks is possible, in both terrestrial (oceanic hydrothermalism, subduction zones and transform faulting) and extraterrestrial environments. The process of alteration from mafic minerals to serpentine group minerals is called serpentinization. Serpentine minerals are often formed by the hydration of olivine-rich ultramafic rocks at relatively low temperatures (0 to ~600 °C). The chemical reaction turns olivine into serpentine minerals. They may also have their origins in metamorphic alterations of peridotite and pyroxene. Serpentines may also pseudomorphously replace other magnesium silicates. Incomplete alteration causes the physical properties of serpentines to vary widely.

Antigorite is the polymorph of serpentine that most commonly forms during metamorphism of wet ultramafic rocks and is stable at the highest temperatures—to over 600 °C (1,100 °F) at depths of 60 km (37 mi) or so. In contrast, lizardite and chrysotile typically form near the Earth's surface and break down at relatively low temperatures, probably well below 400 °C (800 °F). It has been suggested that chrysotile is never stable relative to either of the other two serpentine polymorphs.

Samples of the oceanic crust and uppermost mantle from ocean basins document that ultramafic rocks there commonly contain abundant serpentine. Antigorite contains water in its structure, about 13 percent by weight. Hence, antigorite may play an important role in the transport of water into the earth in subduction zones and in the subsequent release of water to create magmas in island arcs, and some of the water may be carried to yet greater depths.

Occurrence is worldwide, notable localities include New Caledonia, Canada (Quebec), US (northern California, Rhode Island, Connecticut, Massachusetts, Maryland, southern Pennsylvania) and Virginia. Afghanistan, Britain (the Lizard peninsula in Cornwall), Ireland, Greece (Thessaly), China, Russia (Ural Mountains), France, Korea, Austria (Styria and Carinthia), India (Assam, and Manipur), Myanmar (Burma), New Zealand, Norway and Italy.

== Uses ==
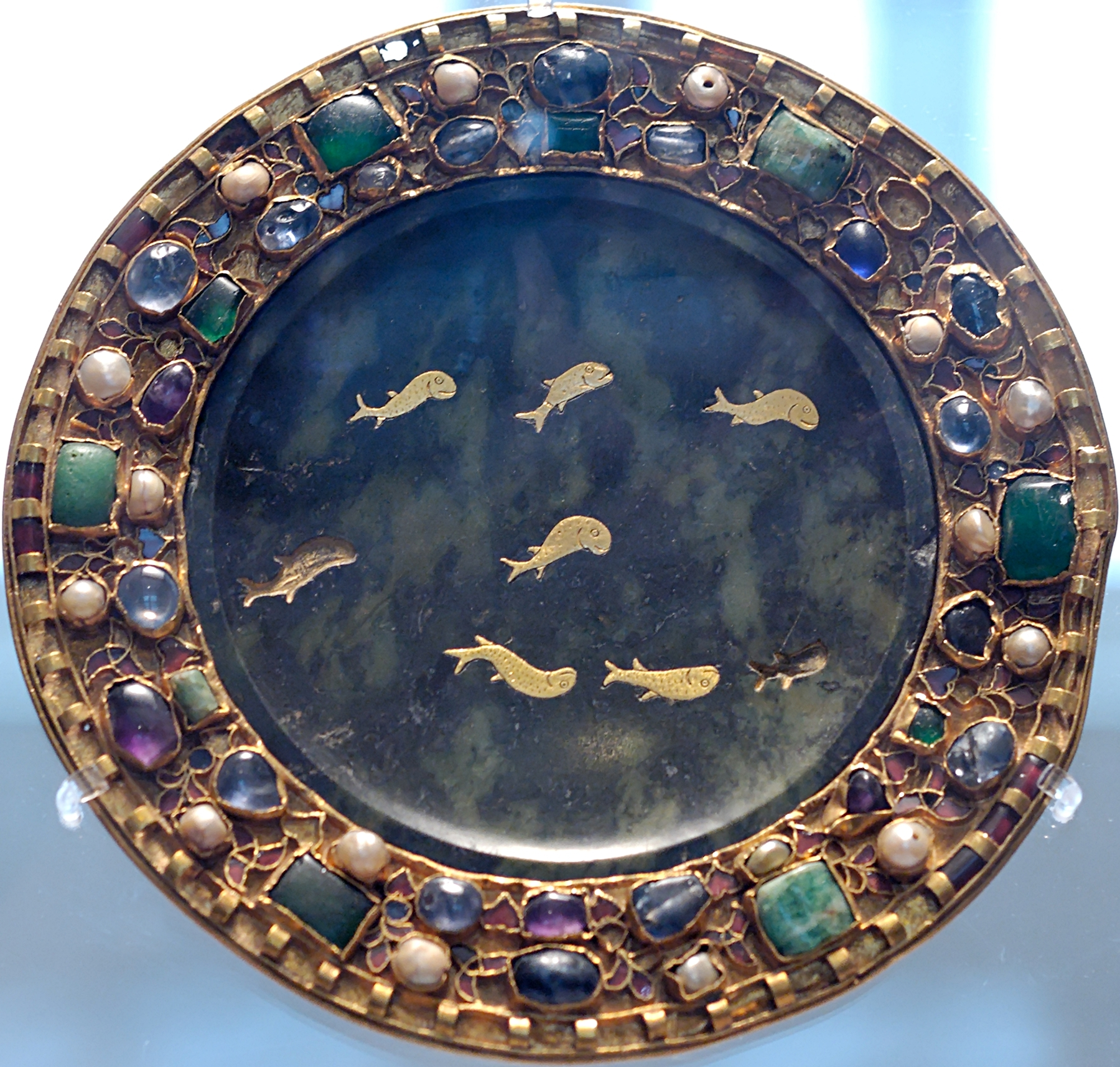
Paten dish of serpentine with inlaid gold fish, 1st century BC to 1st century AD, with 9th-century mounts

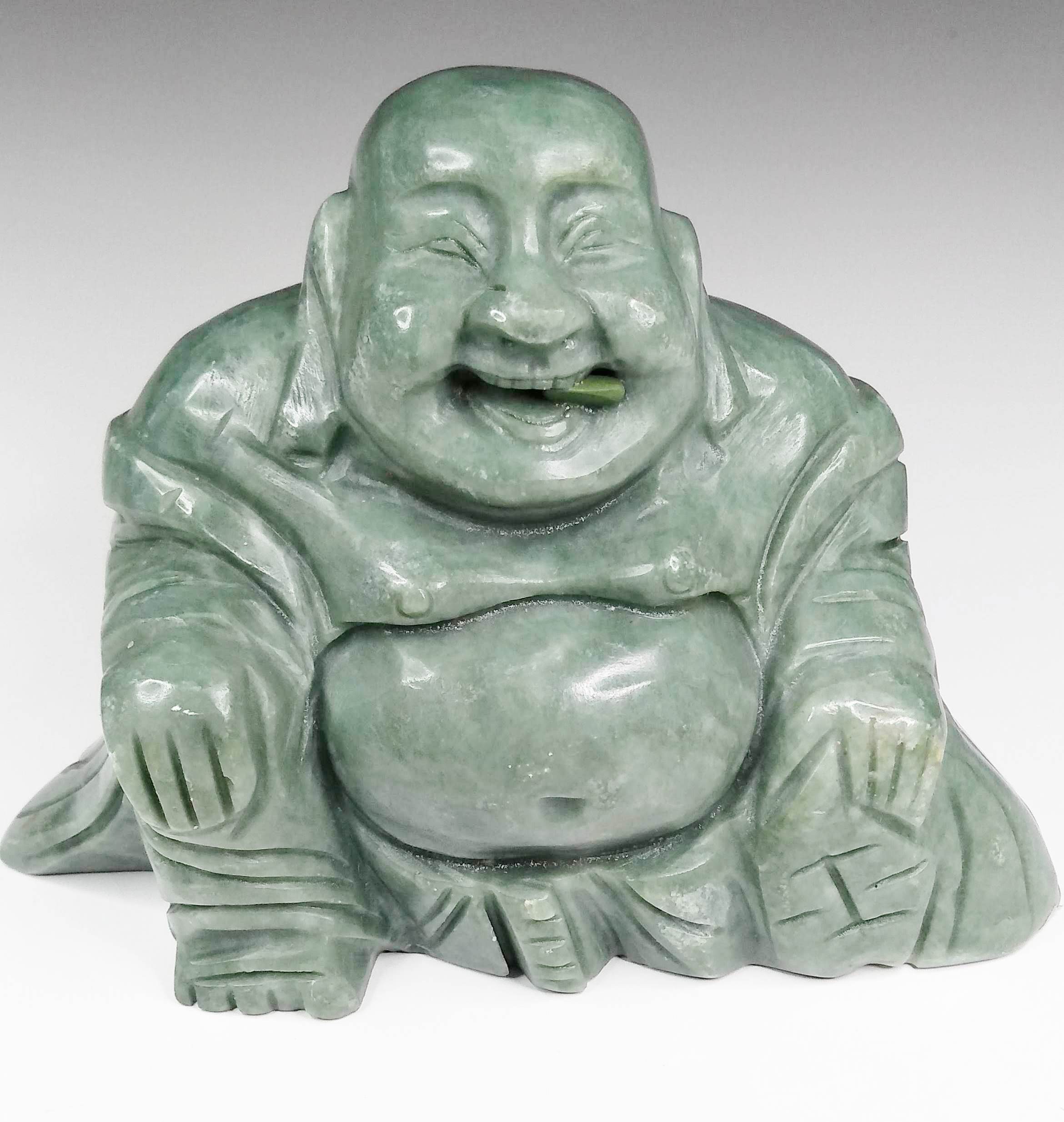
Budai carved from serpentine, height 8 cm (3.1 in)

Serpentines find use in industry for several purposes, such as railway ballasts, building materials, and the asbestiform types find use as thermal and electrical insulation (chrysotile asbestos). The asbestos content can be released into the air when serpentine is excavated and if it is used as a road surface, forming a long-term health hazard by breathing. Asbestos from serpentine can also appear at low levels in water supplies through normal weathering processes, but there is as yet no fully proven health hazard associated with use or ingestion, although the EPA states an increased risk of developing benign intestinal polyps can occur. In its natural state, some forms of serpentine react with carbon dioxide and re-release oxygen into the atmosphere.

The more attractive and durable varieties (all of the antigorite) are termed "noble" or "precious" serpentine and are used extensively as gems and in ornamental carvings. The town of Bhera in the historic Punjab province of the Indian subcontinent was known for centuries for finishing a relatively pure form of green serpentine obtained from quarries in Afghanistan into lapidary work, cups, ornamental sword hilts, and dagger handles. This high-grade serpentine ore was known as sang-i-yashm in Persian, or 'false jade' in English, and was used for generations by Indian craftsmen for lapidary work. It is easily carved, taking a good polish, and is said to have a pleasingly greasy feel. Less valuable serpentine ores of varying hardness and clarity are also sometimes dyed to imitate jade. Misleading synonyms for this material include "Suzhou jade", "Styrian jade", and "New jade".

New Caledonian serpentine is particularly rich in nickel. The Māori of New Zealand once carved beautiful objects from local serpentine, which they called tangiwai, meaning "tears".

The lapis atracius of the Romans, now known as verde antique, or verde antic, is a serpentinite breccia popular as a decorative facing stone. In classical times it was mined at Casambala, Thessaly, Greece. Serpentinite marbles are also widely used: Green Connemara marble (or 'Irish green marble') from Connemara, Ireland (and many other sources), and red Rosso di Levanto marble from Italy. Use is limited to indoor settings as serpentinites do not weather well.

== Potential harm ==
Soils derived from serpentine are toxic to many plants, because of high levels of nickel, chromium, and cobalt; growth of many plants is also inhibited by low levels of potassium and phosphorus and a low ratio of calcium/magnesium. The flora is generally very distinctive, with specialized, slow-growing species. Areas of serpentine-derived soil will show as strips of shrubland and open, scattered small trees (often conifers) within otherwise forested areas; these areas are called serpentine barrens.

== Antigorite variety ==
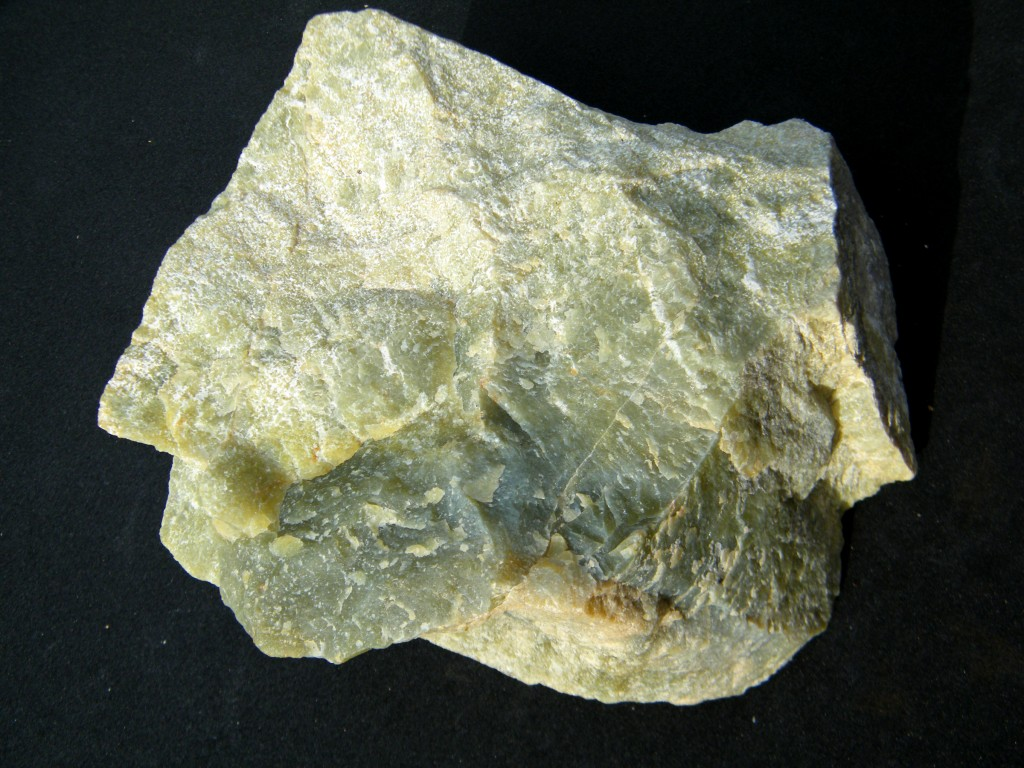
Bowenite from Asbestos mine, Thurman Township, Warren County, New York, US

Lamellated antigorite occurs in tough, pleated masses. It is usually dark green, but may also be yellowish, gray, brown or black. It has a hardness of 3.5–4 and its luster is greasy. The monoclinic crystals show micaceous cleavage and fuse with difficulty. Antigorite is named after its type locality, the Geisspfad serpentinite, Valle Antigorio in the border region of Italy/Switzerland.

=== Bowenite ===
Bowenite, a variety of antigorite, is an especially hard serpentine (5.5) of light to dark apple green color, often mottled with cloudy white patches and darker veining. It is the serpentine most frequently encountered in carving and jewelry. The name 'retinalite' is sometimes applied to yellow bowenite. The New Zealand material is called tangiwai.

Although not an official species, bowenite is the state mineral of Rhode Island, United States: this is also the variety's type locality. A bowenite cabochon featured as part of the "Our Mineral Heritage Brooch", was presented to U.S. First Lady Mrs. Lady Bird Johnson in 1967.

Williamsite is an American local varietal name for antigorite that is oil-green with black crystals of chromite or magnetite often included. Somewhat resembling fine jade, williamsite is cut into cabochons and beads. It is found mainly in Maryland and Pennsylvania. The most valuable williamsite comes from the rocky springs region of Maryland and the Maryland-Pennsylvania state line. However, this material is becoming increasingly rare as the deposits are depleted and rendered inaccessible by construction.

line[20]

=== Gymnite ===
Gymnite is an amorphous form of antigorite. It was originally found in the Bare Hills of Maryland, and is named from the Greek, 'gymnos', meaning "bare" or "naked".

== State emblem ==
In 1965, the California Legislature designated the mineral serpentine as "the official State Rock and lithologic emblem".

== Gallery ==
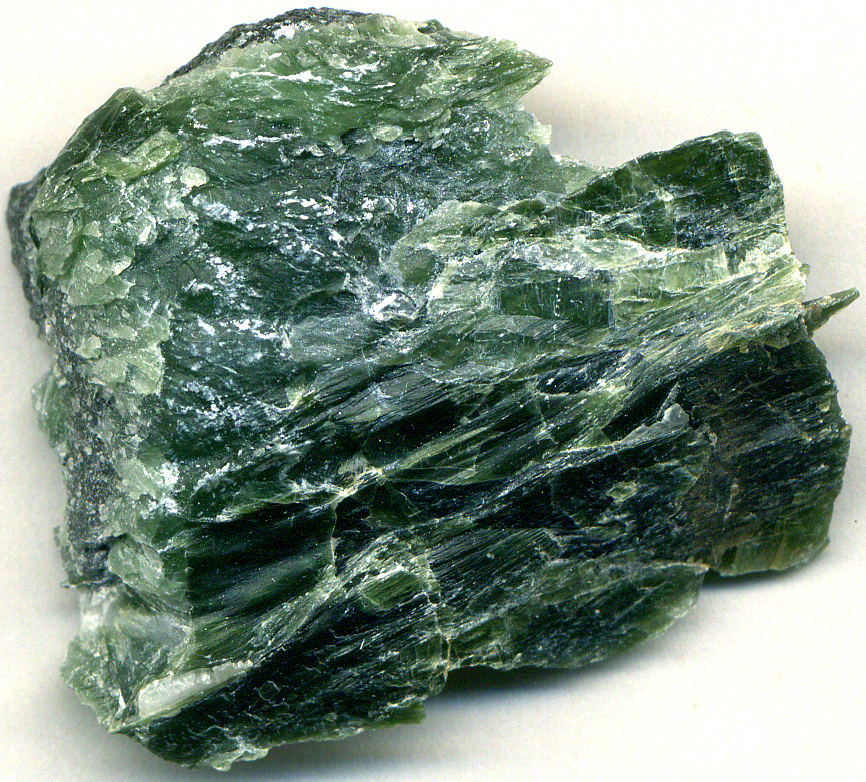
Serpentinite from the Precambrian of Michigan, US

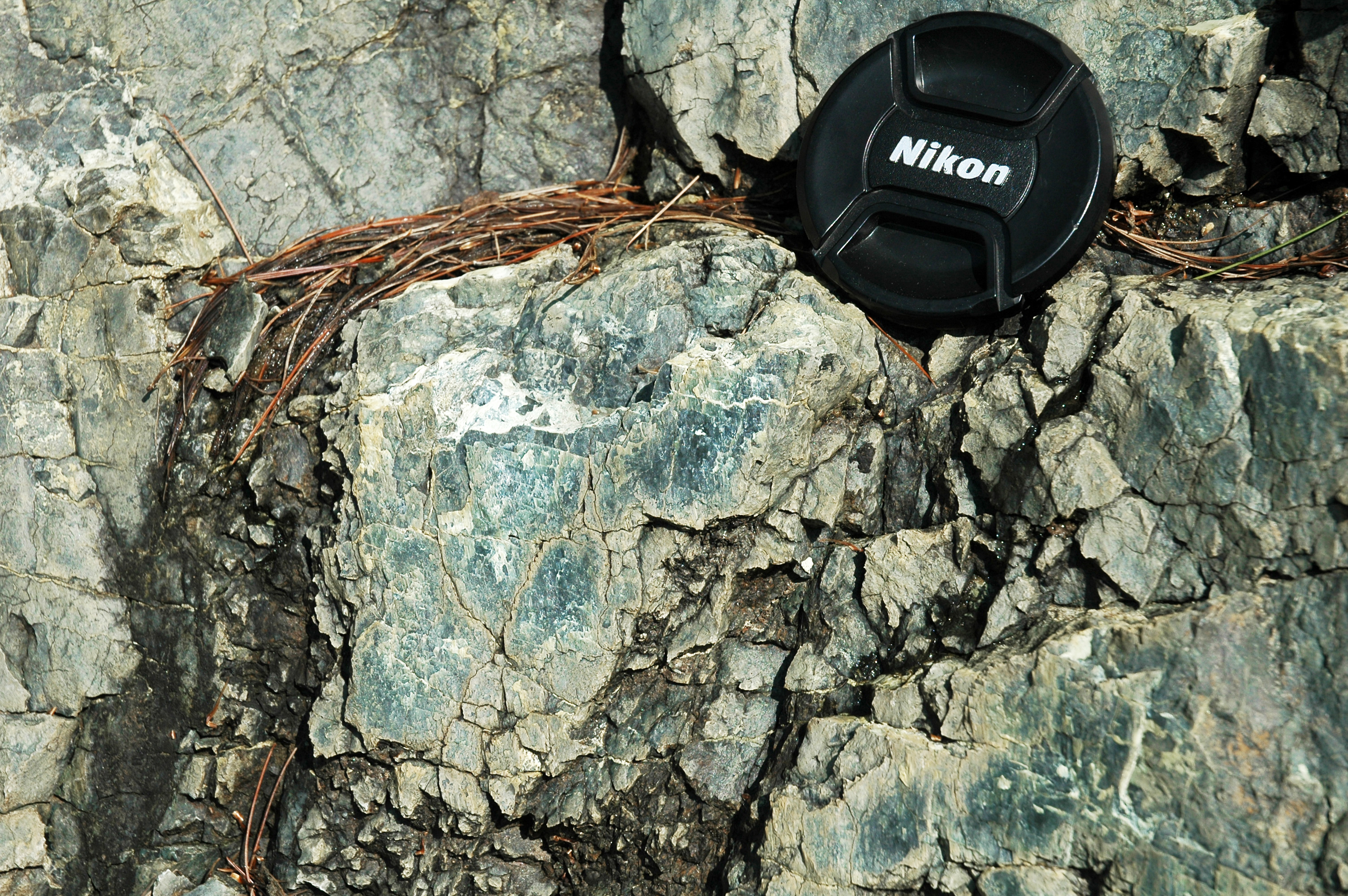
Serpentinite from East Dover Ultramafic Body, Ordovician; roadcut east of East Dover, Vermont, US

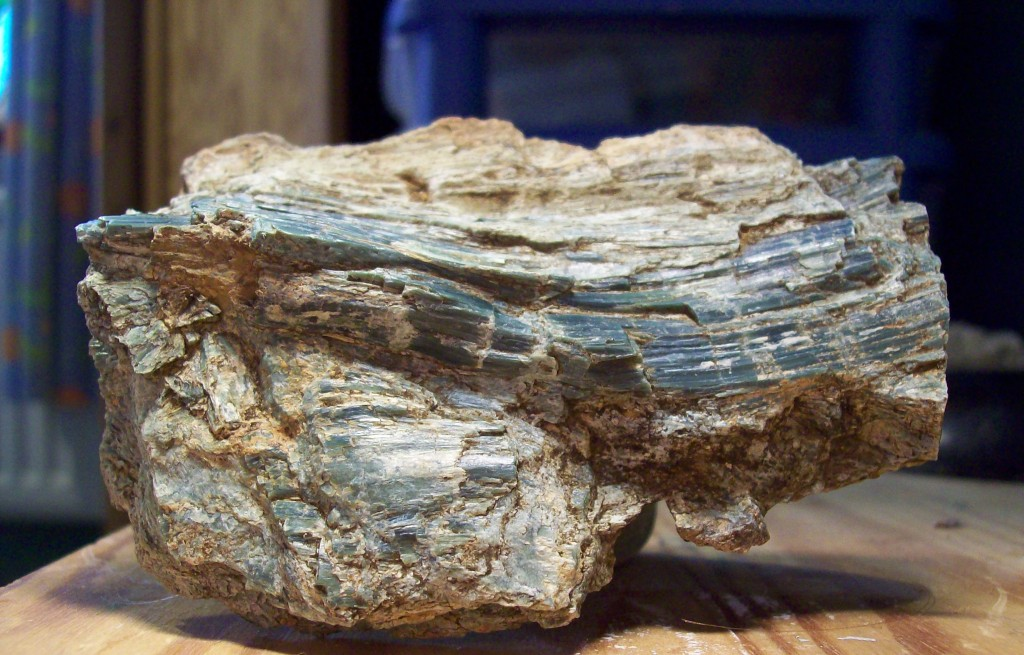
Antigorite from Clay Geo, Unst, Shetland Islands, Scotland, UK

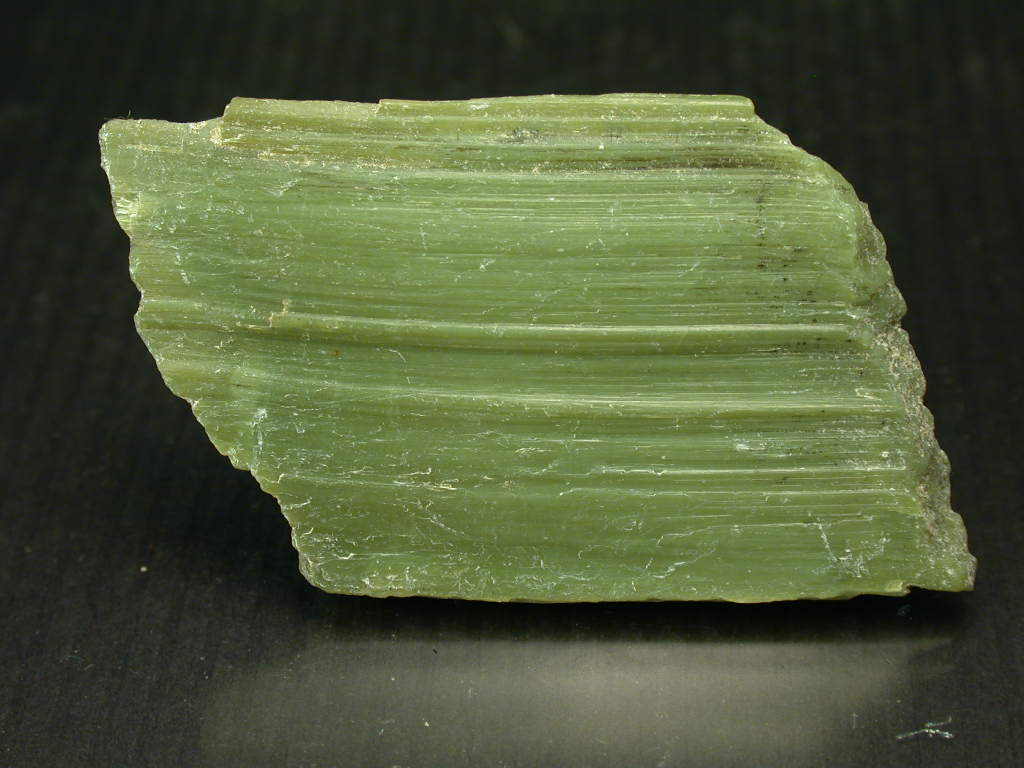
Antigorite from Lord Brassey Mine, Heazlewood district, Tasmania, Australia

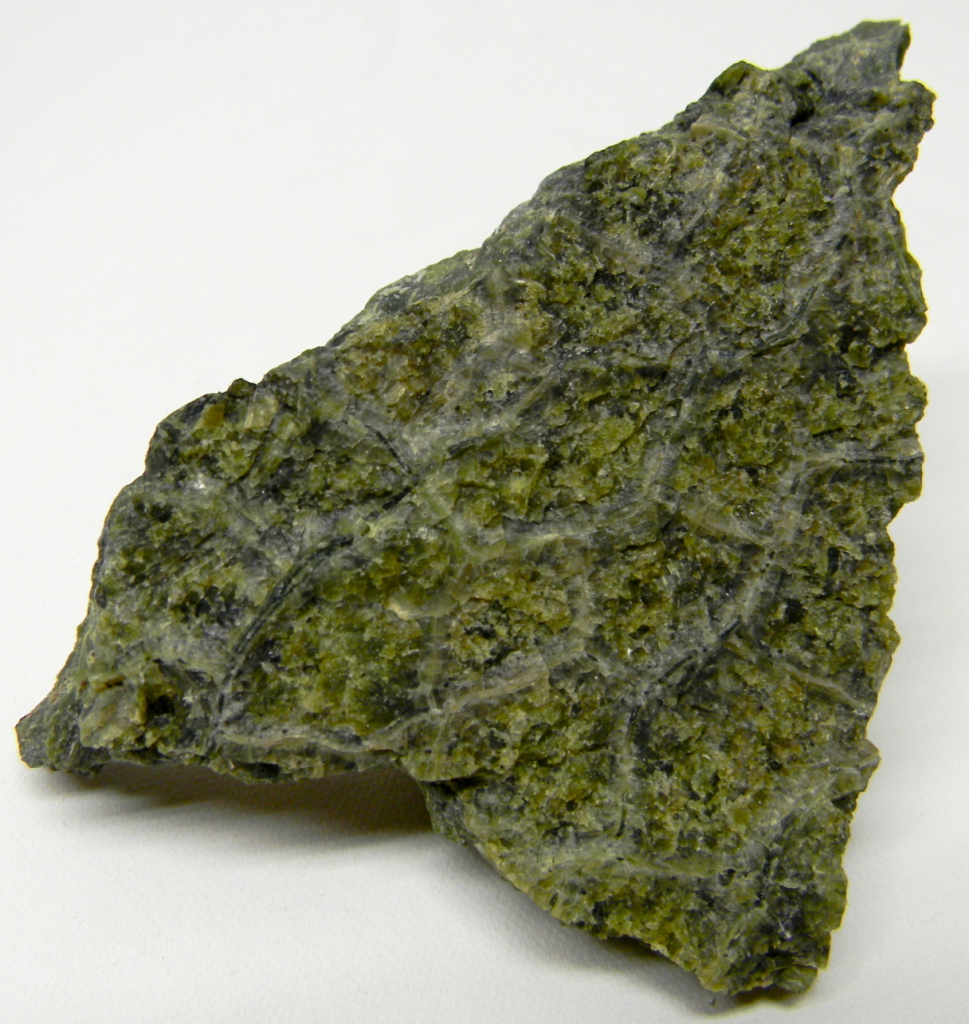
Slab of curiously patterned antigorite from the Jeffrey Mine, Quebec, Canada

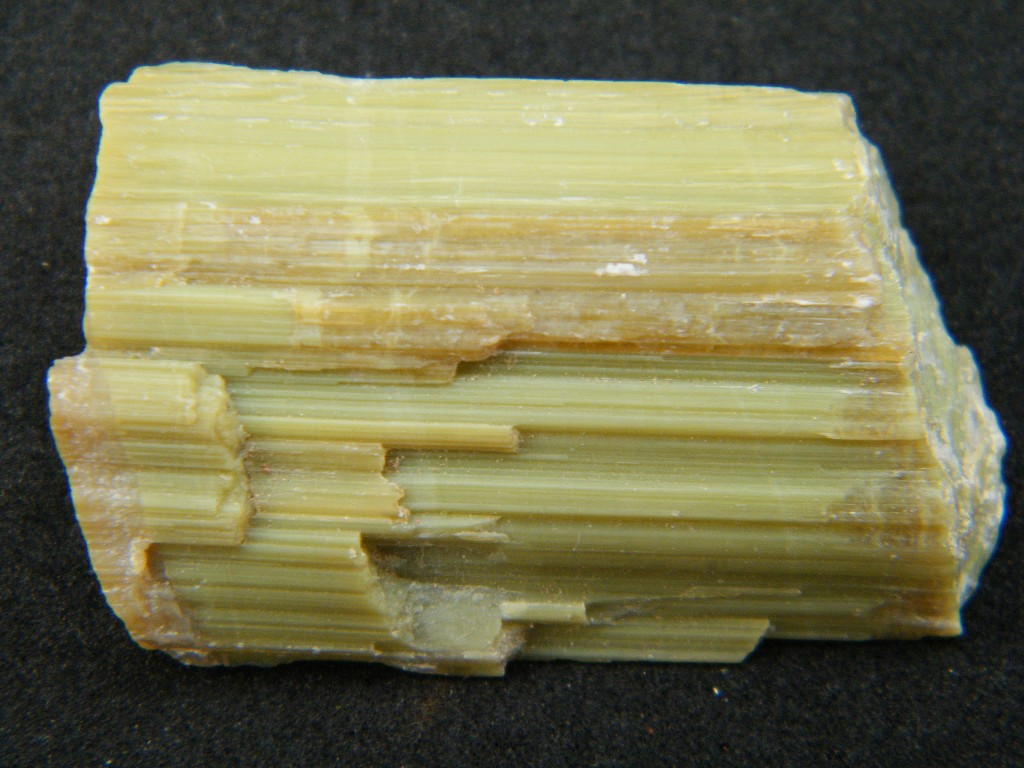
Picrolite (antigorite) from Quebec looking in color and form like a bit of celery

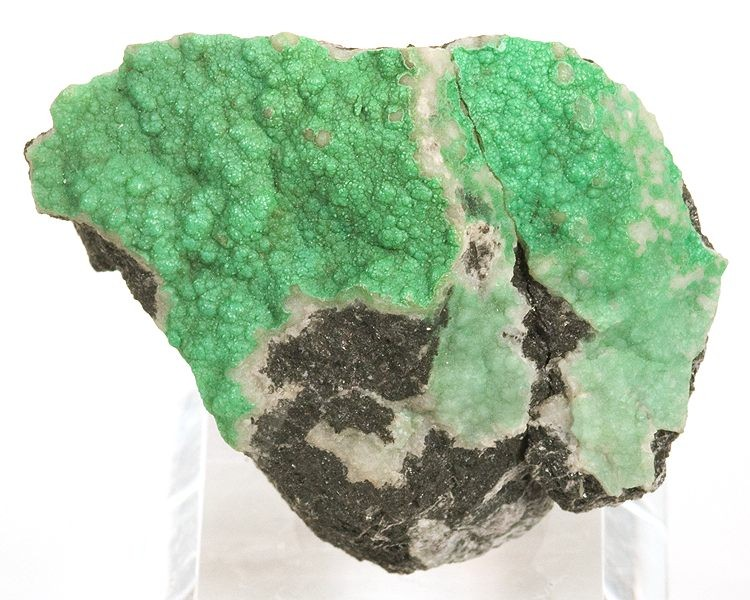
Genthite (antigorite) from Wood's Chrome Mine. The bright green, lustrous antigorite richly covering this specimen has an unusual knobby/bubbly/drusy form.

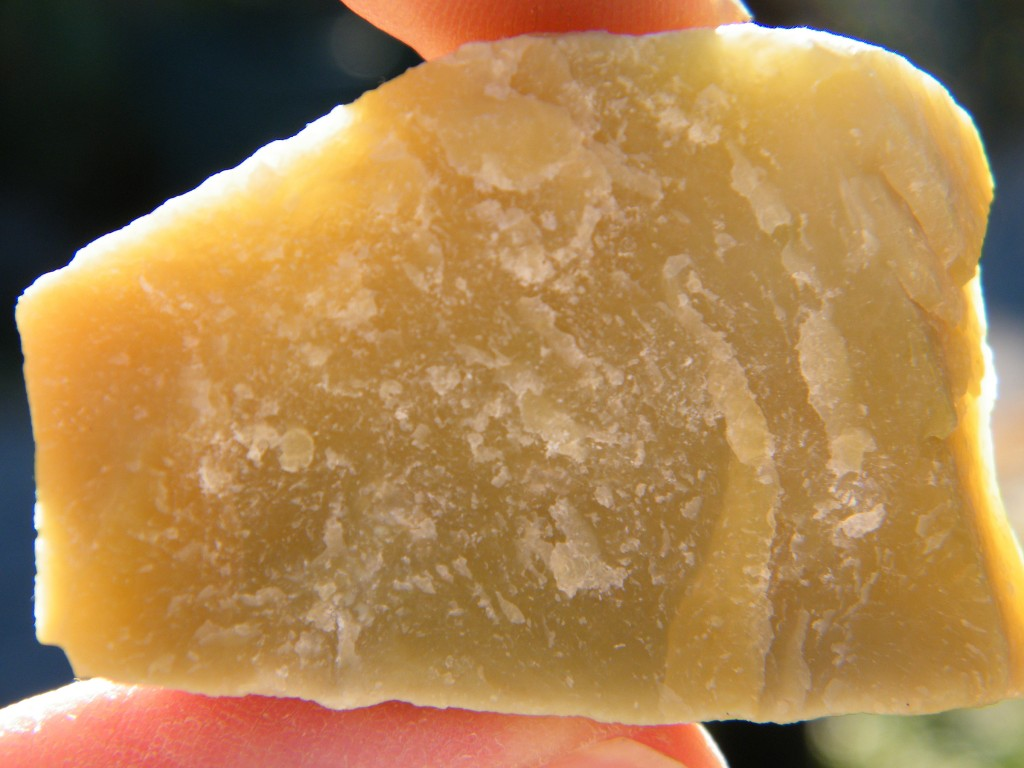
Bowenite (Antigorite) from Asbestos mine, Thurman Township, Warren County, New York, US

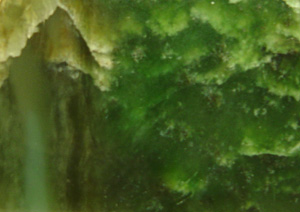
Polished slab of bowenite serpentine, a variety of antigorite. Typical cloudy patches and veining are apparent.

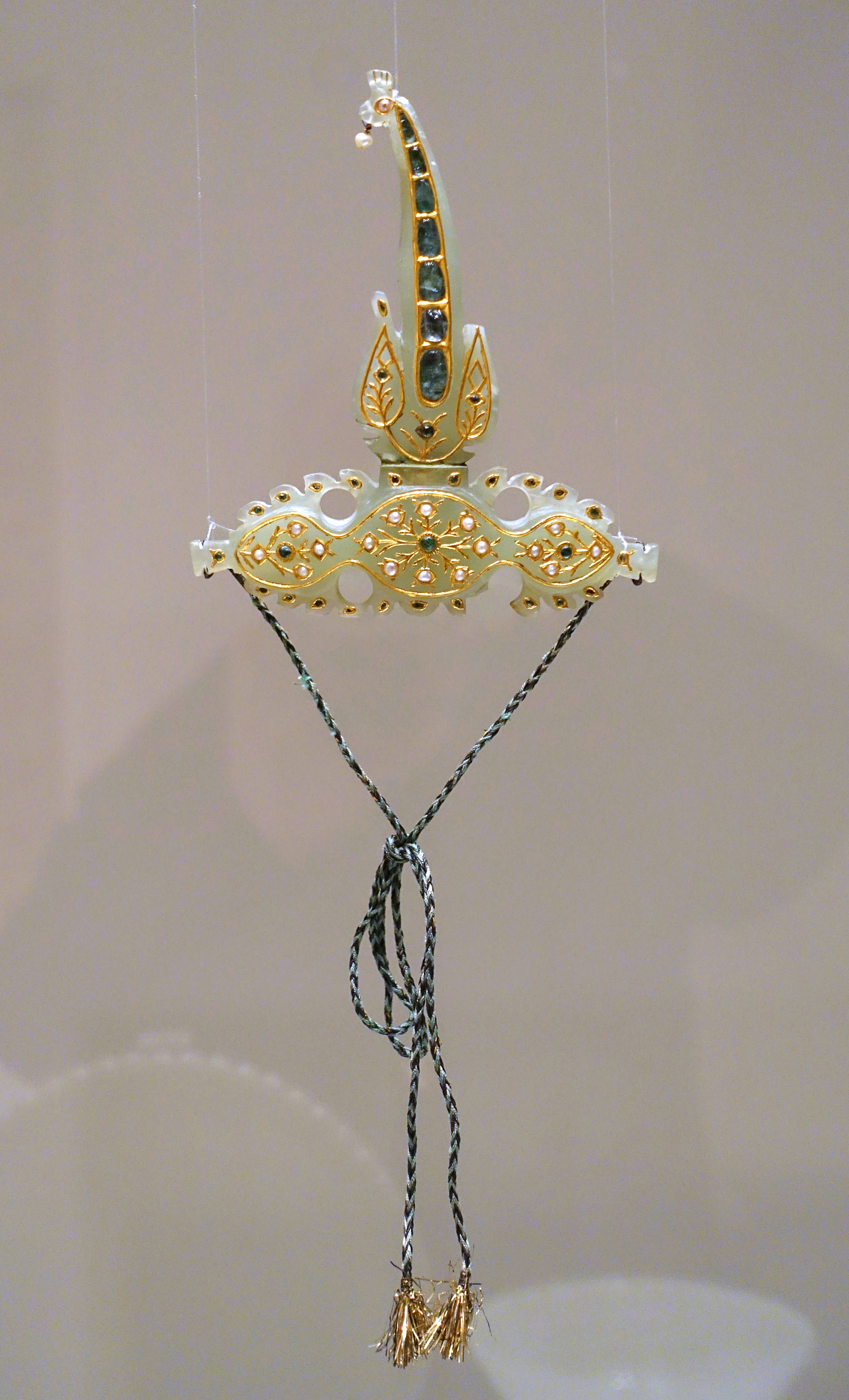
Turban ornament, North India, Delhi or Jaipur, 18th–19th century, antigorite, gold, pearls, glass. Ethnological Museum, Berlin

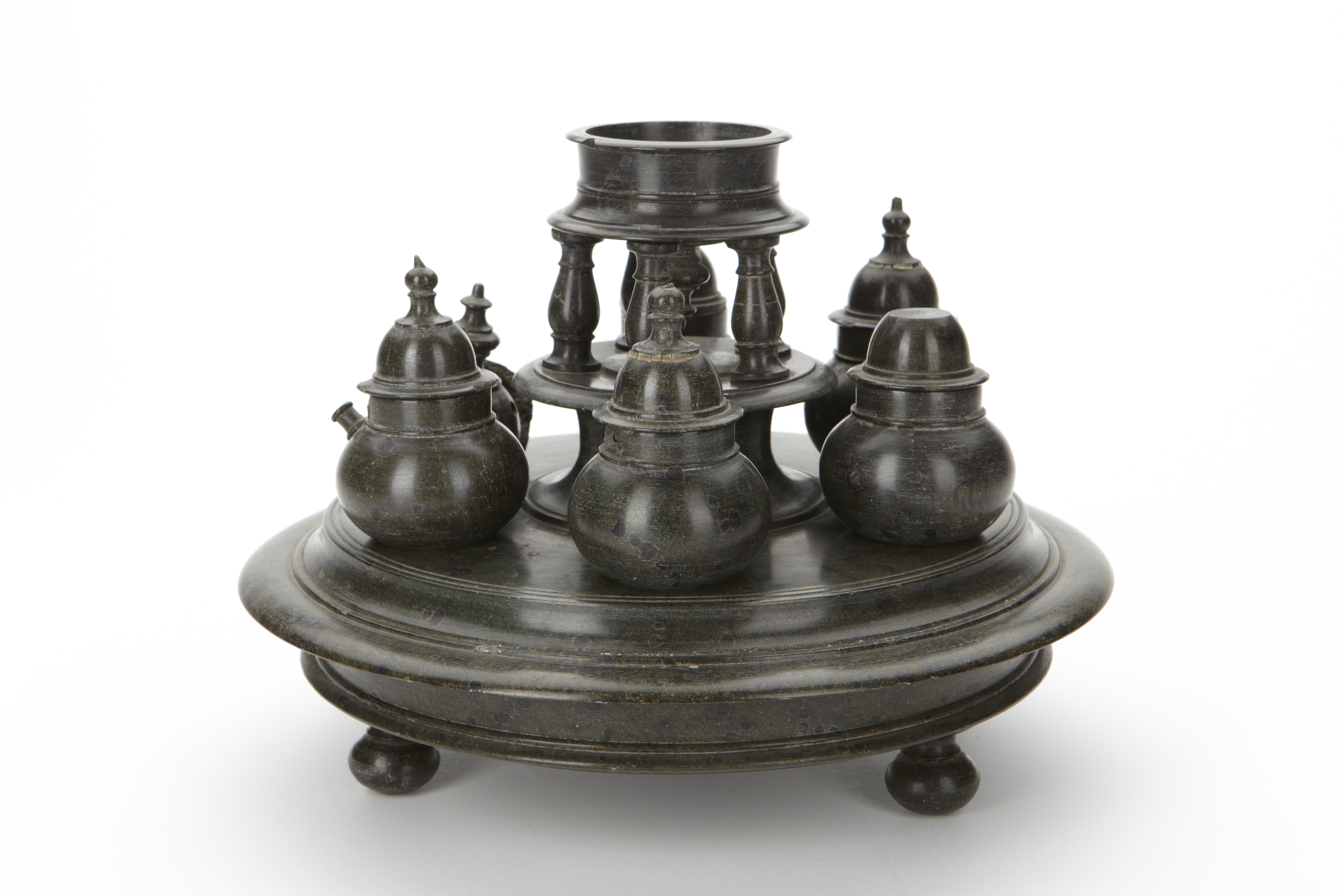
Turned green serpentine table display, 17th century

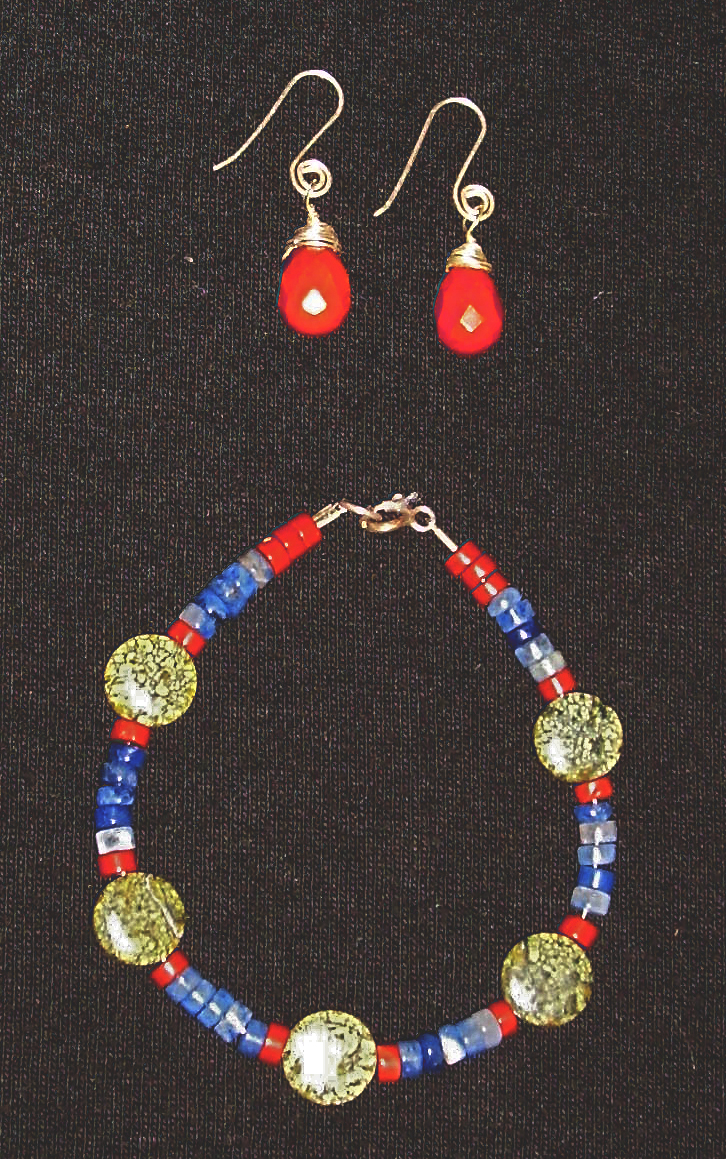
Necklace and earring set made from semiprecious stones. The spherical green beads are Russian serpentine. Also used are jasper (red) and fluorite (blue).

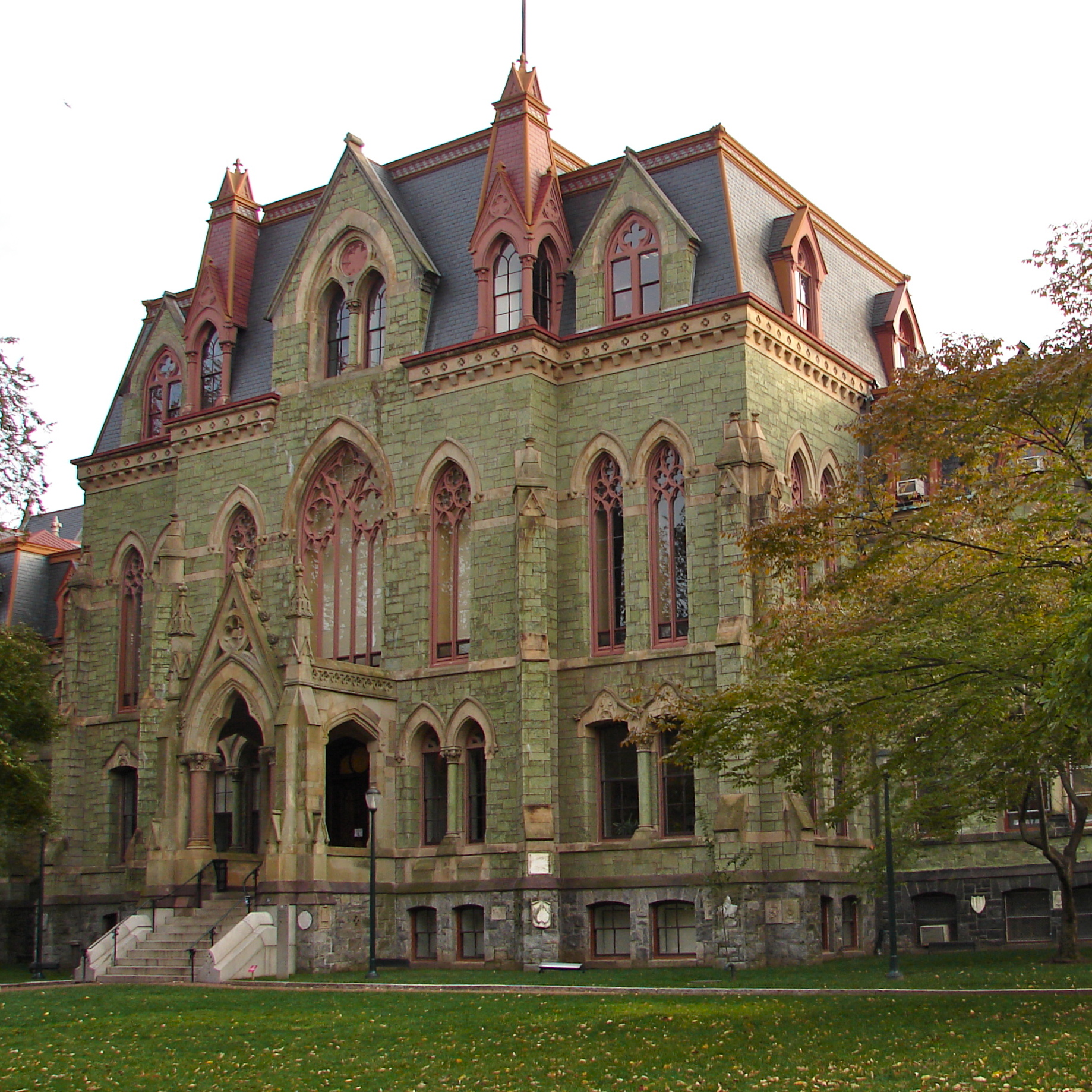
College Hall at University of Pennsylvania

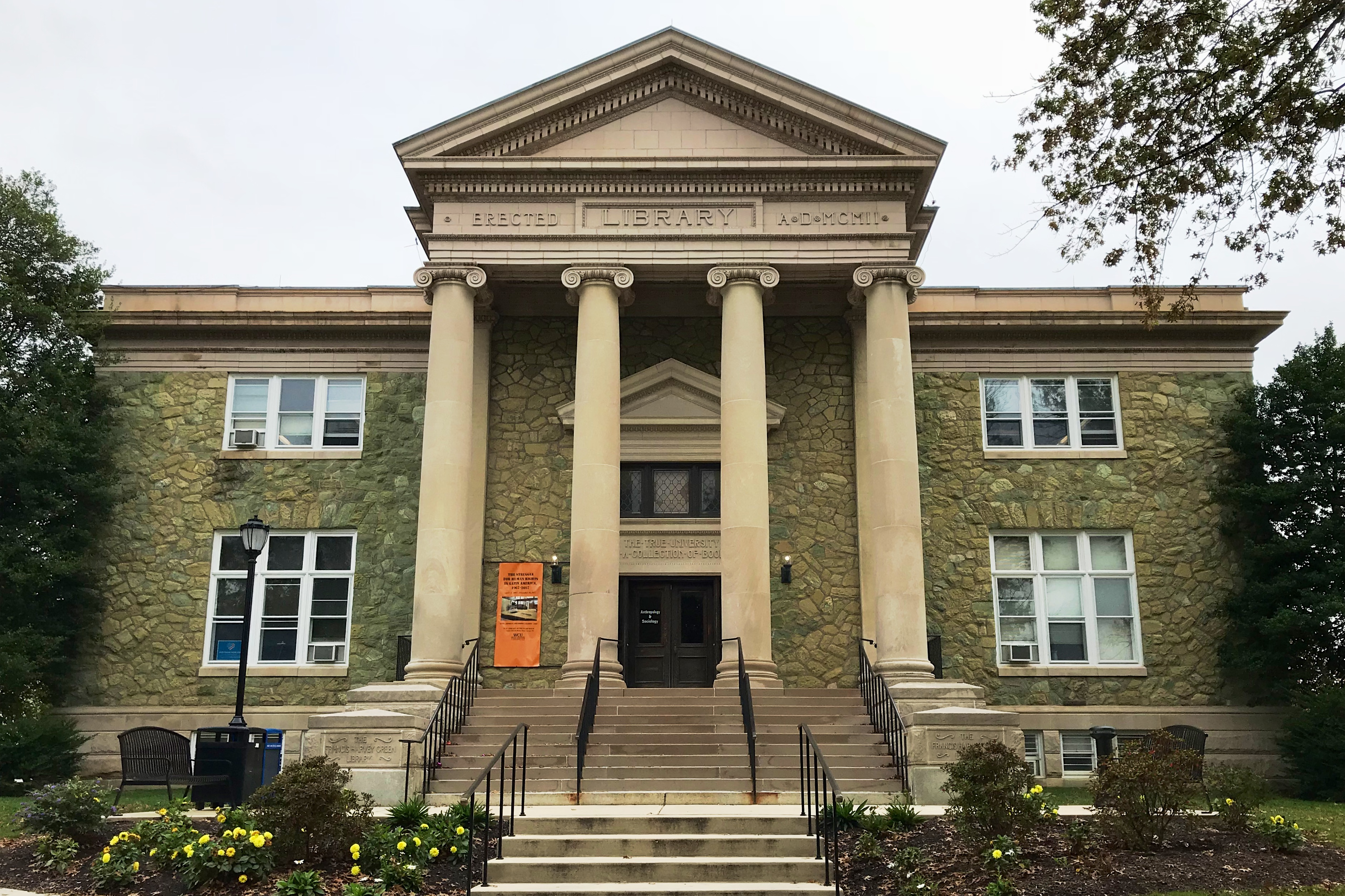
Old Library Building at West Chester University

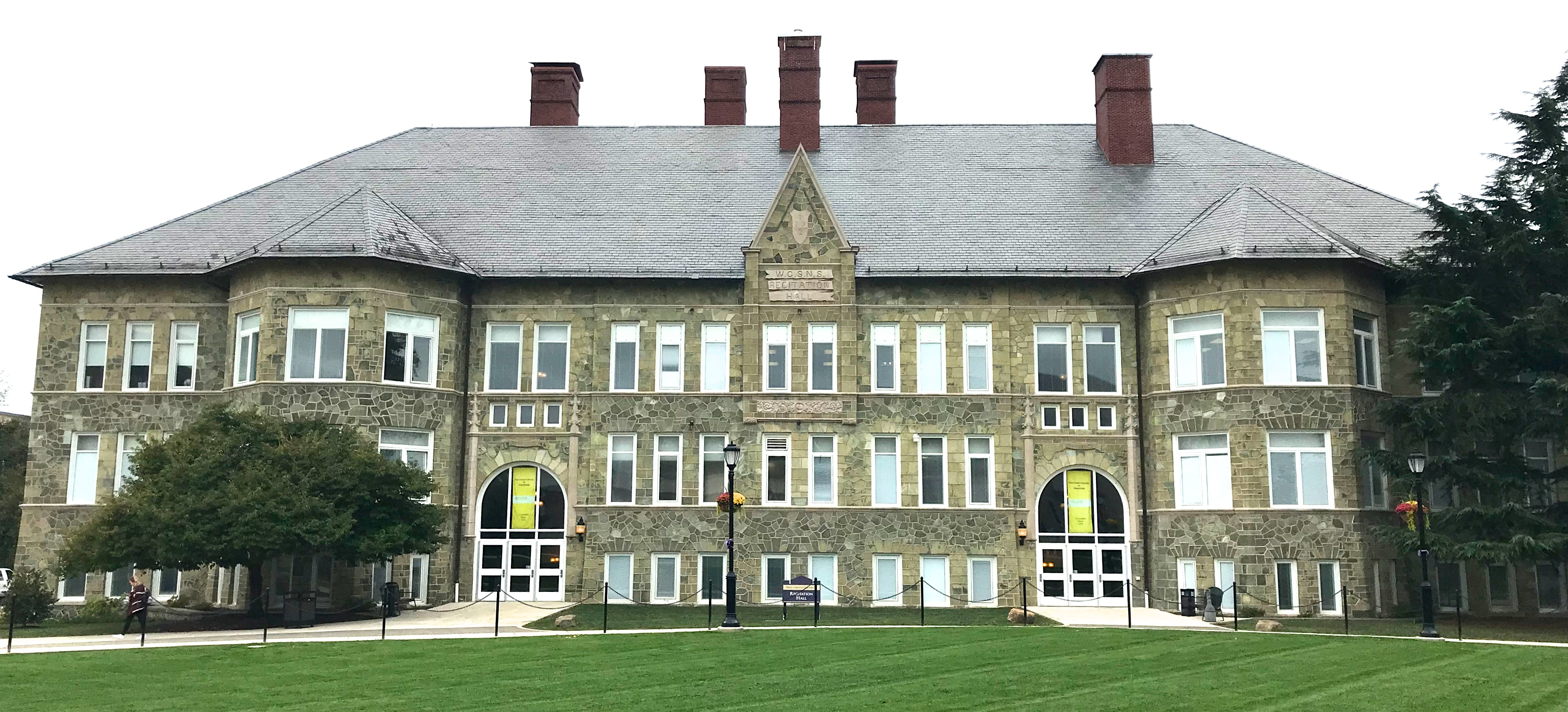
Recitation Hall at West Chester University
