= Modelling clay =

Any of a group of malleable substances used in building and sculpting

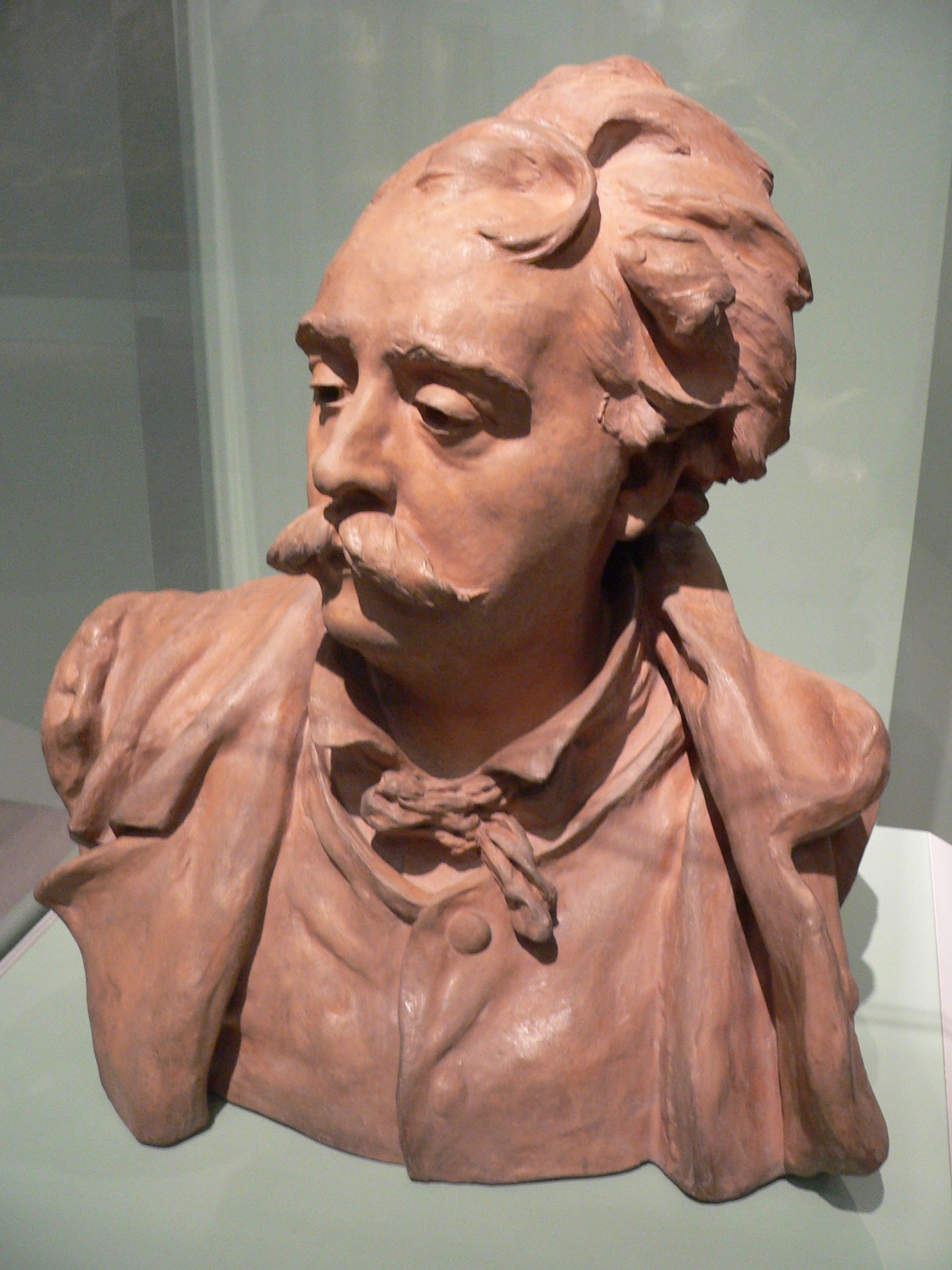
A bust of the sculptor Albert-Ernest Carrier-Belleuse, by Auguste Rodin (1882). Terracotta, originally modelled in clay.

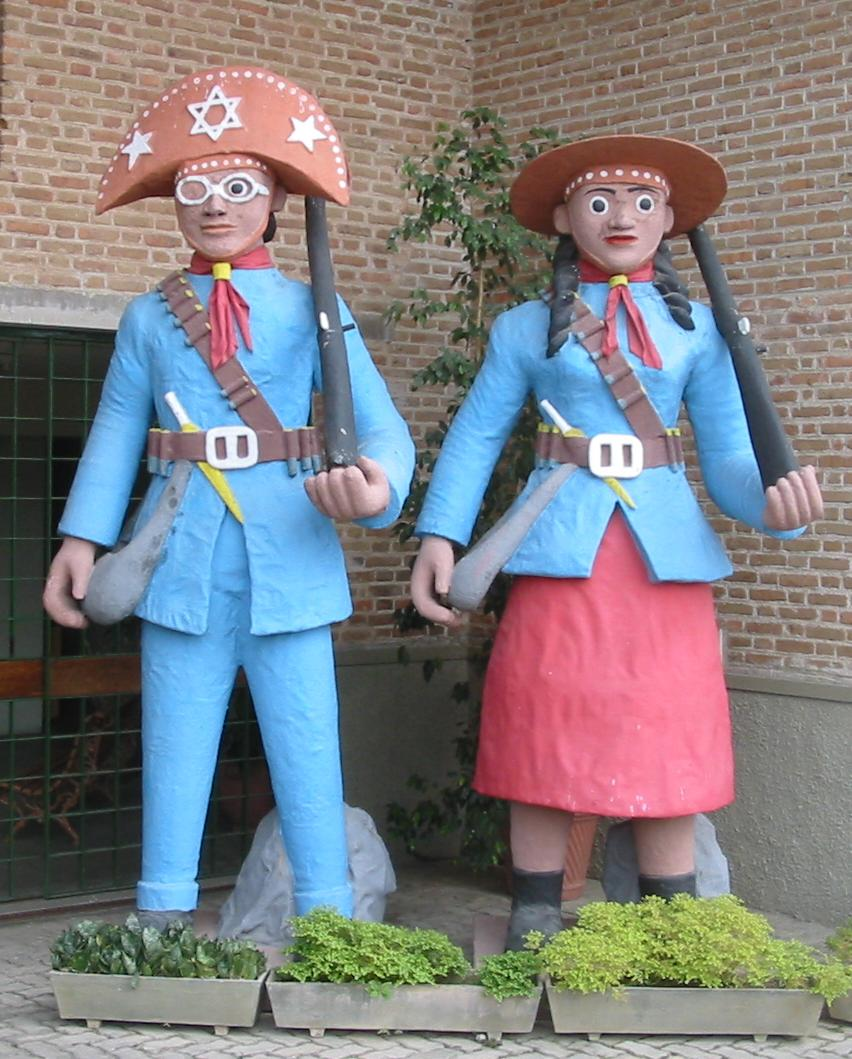
Giant clay sculptures in Caruaru (Brazil).

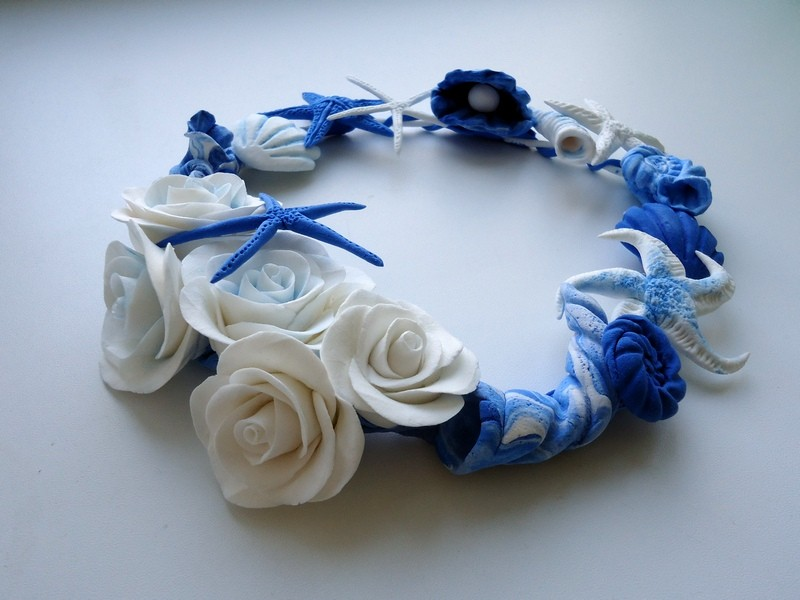
Roses and seashells made of Paperclay (DECO)

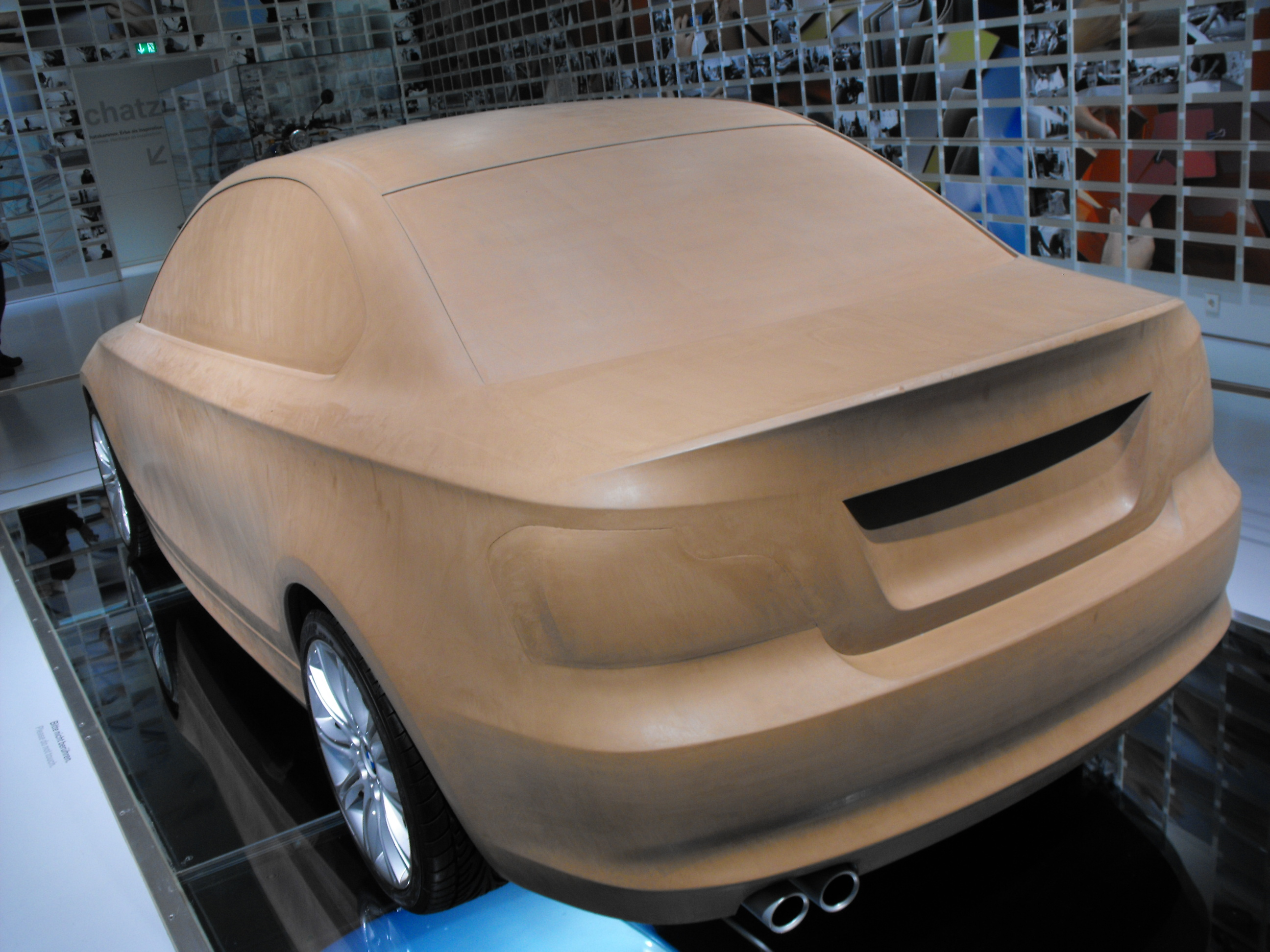
Industrial clay: a clay model of a BMW

Modelling clay or modelling compound is any of a group of malleable substances used in building and sculpting. The material compositions and production processes vary considerably.

== Ceramic clay ==
Ceramic clays are water-based substances made from clay minerals and other raw materials. They are baked at high temperatures in a process known as firing to create ceramics, such as terra cotta, earthenware, stoneware, and porcelain.

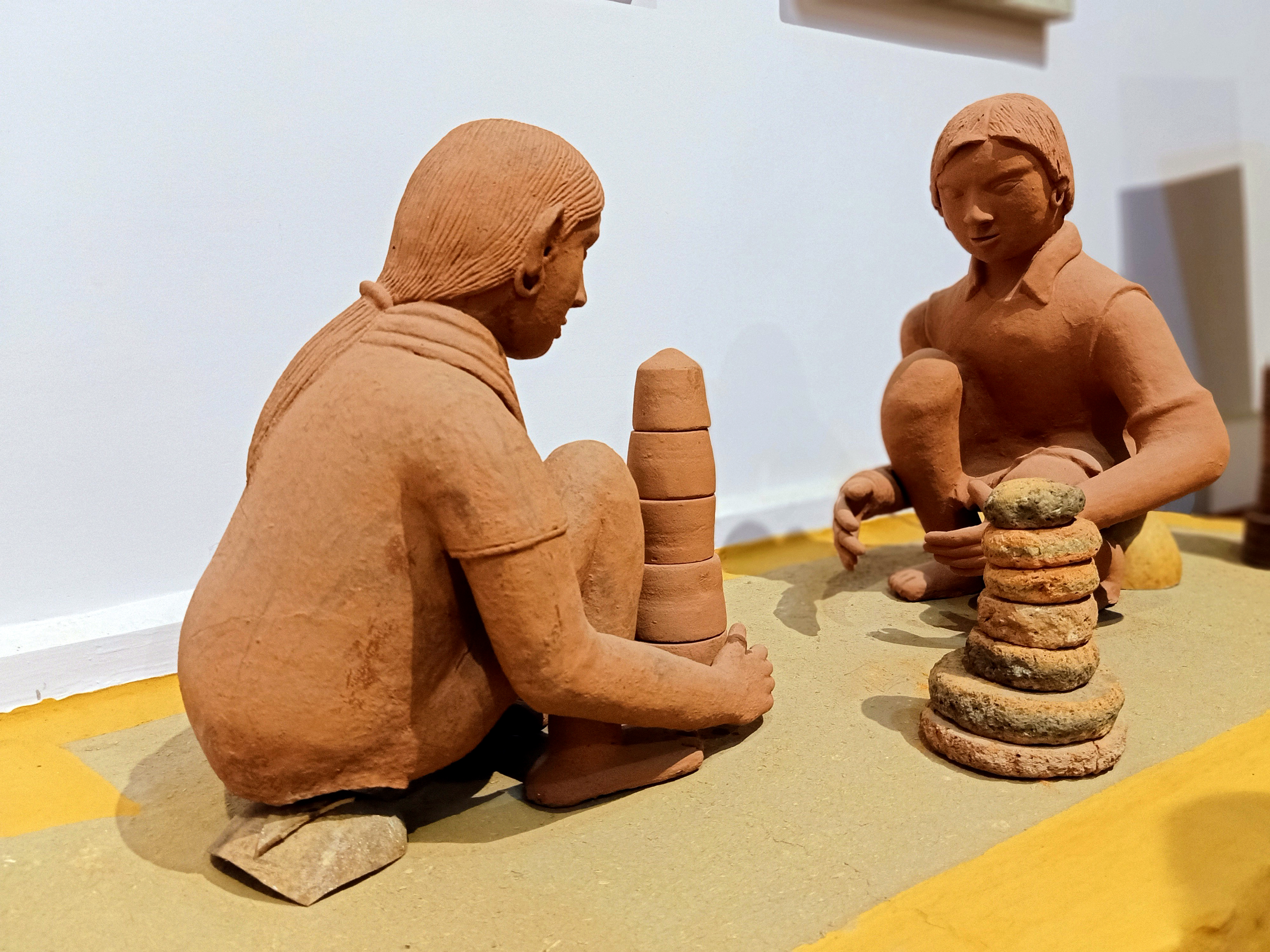
Clay model of Indian traditional village games

== Oil-based clay ==
Oil-based clays are made from combinations of oils, waxes, and clay minerals.

Unlike water, the oils do not evaporate and oil-based clays remain malleable even when left in dry environments for long periods. Articles made from oil-based clays cannot be fired, and thus are not ceramics. Because rising temperature decreases oil viscosity, the malleability is influenced by heating or cooling the clay. Oil-based clay is not water-soluble. As it can be re-used, it is a material commonly used by stop motion animators who need to bend and move their models. It is available in a multitude of colors and is non-toxic. Readily worked in fine detail, oil-based clays are also suitable for the creation of detailed sculptures from which molds can be made. Castings and reproductions can then be produced from much more durable materials. Cars and airplanes may be created using industrial design-grade modelling clay.

Oil-based clays are referred to by multiple of genericized trademarks.

- Plastilin (or Plasteline), which was patented in Germany by Franz Kolb in 1880, was developed by Claude Chavant in 1892 and trademarked in 1927.
- Plasticine was invented in 1897 by William Harbutt of Bathampton, England.
- Plastilina is trademarked as Roma Plastilina by Sculpture House, Inc. According to their website, their formula is 100 years old. Roma Plastilina contains sulfur, and since certain moldmaking compounds do not set in sulfur's presence, making molds of items made of industrial plasticine is difficult.

== Polymer clay ==
Polymer clay is a modelling material that cures when heated from 129 to 135 °C (265 to 275 °F) for 15 minutes per 6 millimetres (1/4 in) of thickness, and does not significantly shrink or change shape during the process. Despite being called "clay", it generally contains no clay minerals. Polymer clay is sold in craft, hobby, and art stores, and is used by artists, hobbyists, and children. Polymer clay is used in animation, since it allows static forms to be manipulated frame after frame. Leading brands of polymer clay include Fimo, Kato Polyclay, Sculpey, Modello and Crafty Argentina.

== Paper clay ==
Paper clay is handmade or commercially available clay to which a small percentage of processed cellulose fiber is added. The fiber increases the tensile strength of the dry clay and enables dry-to-dry and wet-to-dry joins. Commercial paper clays air-dry to a firm, lightweight sculpture, with minimal shrinking during the drying process.

Paper clay can be used as an unfired body in craft and doll-making. It is used in ceramic art studios as sculptural and functional studio pottery. When kiln-fired, the paper burns out, leaving the clay body. Consequently, the firing temperatures and glazes selection should be the same on those used with the clay body.

== See also ==
- Borax
- Clay (industrial plasticine)
- Clay#Uses
- Gypsum
- Industrial plasticine
- Hydrophobic sand
- Paper clay
- Papier-mâché, rigid-setting construction material made of paper and a wet paste
- Plaster mold casting
- Plasticine
- Putty
- Salt dough, used for modelling (such as Play-Doh)
