= Clayotic =

Modelling clay brand

- Clayotic's logo.
- Company type: Startup company
- Industry: Modelling clay; Toys
- Founded: September 4, 2011; 14 years ago
- Founders: Louise Swords
- Area served: Ireland
- Key people: Louise Swords (CEO)
- Products: Modelling clay
- Website: clayotic.ie

Clayotic, also known as Mess Free Play Dough and No Mess Modeling clay, is a brand of non-toxic, air-hardened modelling clay sold by the Irish company of the same name. It is created for young children to sculpt figures like regular clay. Clayotic comes in several different colours which can be mixed to make others. Once Clayotic is exposed to air within 24 hours, it hardens and dries.

== Similarities ==
Clayotic is similar to Hey Clay, Model Magic, and Jovi due to its air-dry-clay like nature. It can squish, stretch, and mix into new colours. Once it hardens, it is no longer able to be molded.

== Etymology ==
"Clayotic" comes from clay (relating to its concistency) and chaotic (relating to the creative minds of the child using the product).
