= Salt dough =

Modelling material

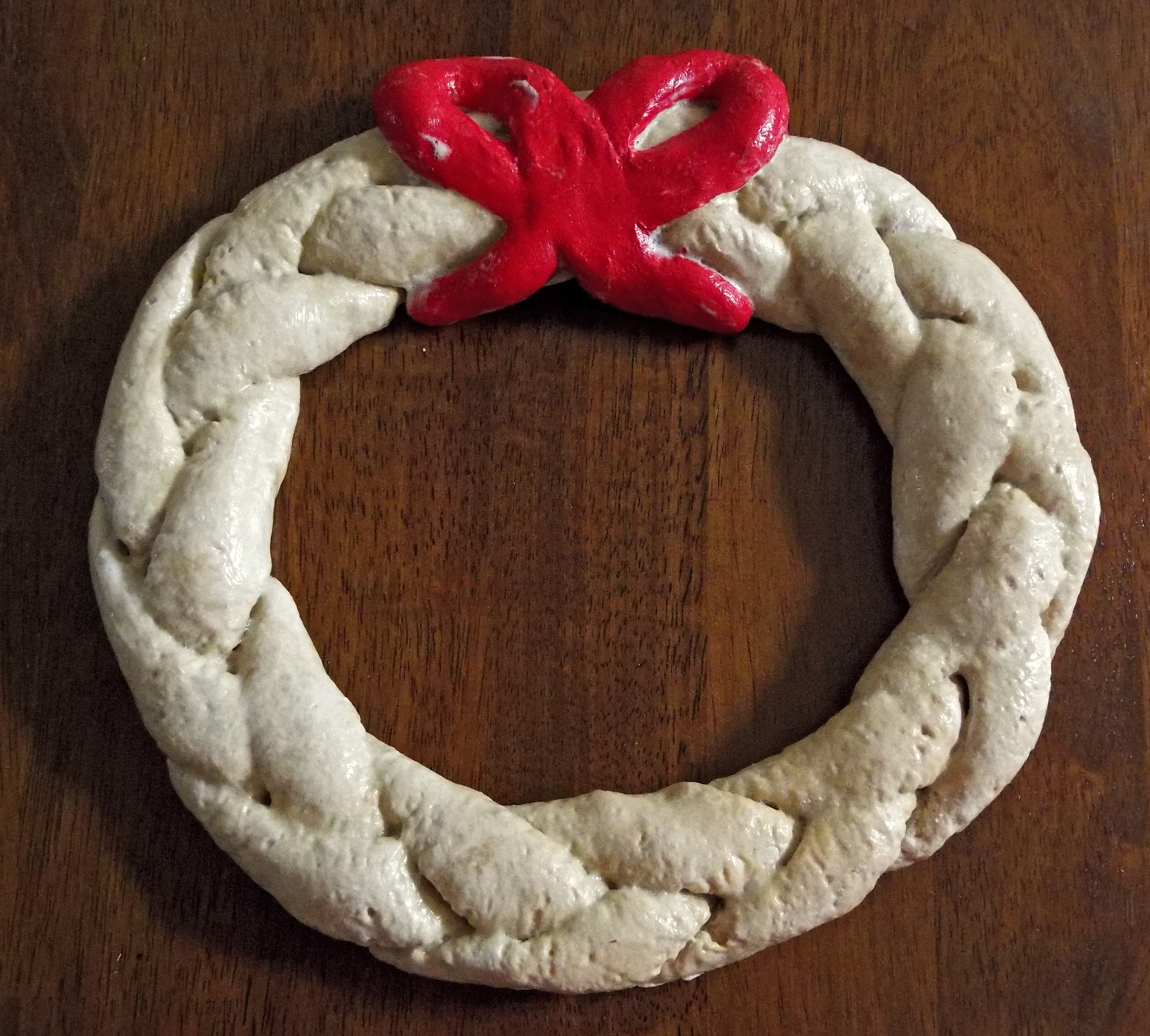
A wreath made from salt dough

Salt dough is a modelling material, made of flour, salt, and water. It can be used to make ornaments and sculptures, and can be dried in conventional and microwave ovens. It can be sealed with varnish or polyurethane; painted with acrylic paint; and stained with food colouring, natural colouring, or paint mixed with the flour or water.

Properly mixed salt dough does not crumble or crack. It is dense and hence heavy, which can cause problems in making large pieces. It can be moulded by hand, without special tools or fixtures, and does not stain hands. Complex sculptures can be made with basic tools.

Salt dough sculptures range from such simple shapes as those of apples, leaves, and mushrooms to more intricate ones, such as trees and animals. It is often used to make Christmas decorations, gifts, and souvenirs. It is used in spring rituals in Eastern Europe and sometimes for weddings and winter rituals.

Ingesting salt dough can cause salt poisoning in pets.

== See also ==
- Clay
- Modeling clay
- Plasticine
- Play-Doh
