= Franz Kolb =

German pharmacist

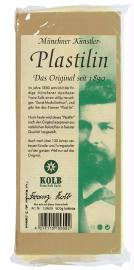
Franz Kolb (Apotheker), Münchner Künstler-Plastilin

Franz Kolb (fl. 1880s) was a German pharmacist and the inventor of the modeling paste Plastilin. In English-speaking countries this material is also known as "plasticine." Because of different patent rights in Germany and England, there are different views about who actually invented plasticine. In England, William Harbutt is seen as the inventor, while in Germany it is Franz Kolb. Kolb's German patent is from 1880, while Harbutt's English one is from 1897. The exact formulation of the two products is different.
