= Philip Spanier =

American visual artist (1926–2024)

- Born: Philip Frederick Joseph Spanier; September 13, 1926; Denver, Colorado, U.S.
- Died: April 28, 2024 (aged 97); Las Vegas, Nevada, U.S.
- Occupations: Visual artist, bodybuilder, veteran
- Website: philipspanierart.com

Philip Frederick Joseph Spanier (September 13, 1926 – April 28, 2024) was an American visual artist, bodybuilder and World War II veteran.

== Early life and education ==
Spanier was born in Denver, Colorado on September 13, 1926. Spanier's artistic inclinations were evident from childhood, demonstrating skill in wood carving by the age of five. His early works included wood sculptures and later expanded to include clay modeling and fine drawing, demonstrating a layered approach to artistic expression. He graduated from Denver's South High School in 1943. After his graduation, Spanier joined the U.S. Air Force, serving initially in World War II and later in the Korean War as a B-29 flight engineer.

== Career ==
After returning from Korea, Spanier took up bodybuilding, participating in competitions and earning accolades in events such as the "Mr. Colorado" contest.

After his military service, in 1953, he returned to Colorado to resume civilian life. During this time, he developed an interest in sculpting, creating pieces featuring figures such as Elvis Presley and the Beatles. His hobby gained some local media attention, notably with a sculpture of Liberace, which was featured on a local television station. His works are known for their vivid imagery and interpretative depth.

Spanier's art gained recognition in the art community, leading to his participation in the Los Angeles Art Expo in 1989. In 1995, he opened the Philip Spanier Studio Gallery in Denver's Belcaro-Cherry Creek area, with his collection becoming part of one of the largest private art holdings in the United States.

In 1999, his exhibition, ART TO GO: Sculptures by Phil Spanier, was showcased at the Prestige Imports showroom on West Colfax Avenue in Denver.

Spanier's approach to art, as he expressed in a televised interview, focuses on expressing thoughts and emotions through various mediums, from woodcarving to pen illustrations. He emphasizes the importance of art in enriching the human experience.

== Death ==
Spanier died in Las Vegas, Nevada on April 28, 2024, at the age of 97.

== Bibliography ==
- 2004: Enigma
