= Tone Bergli Joner =

Tone Bergli Joner (born 1935) is a Norwegian non-fiction writer. Her over 70 works pertain to criticism of religion, children's issues and crafts and hobbies.

She was born in Fredrikstad, but grew up in Moss. She attended the Norwegian National Academy of Craft and Art Industry and opened a teenage fashion store. She later worked as a puppet maker. Taking up writing, she among others wrote columns in Det Nye and Kvinner og Klær before taking up book writing in 1977.

She wrote books on children and sleep, books for child readers and two books with "kids say" quotes (Klumpen and Mamma, levde det dinosaurer da du var liten?). In 1990, she released two books on child safety, one for child readers (Barnas sikkerhetsbok) and one for adult readers (Barn og sikkerhet, revised edition). In 1994 she received the Child Safety Award.

Her criticism of religion was mostly tied to child education, criticizing explicit Christian elements in the curricula for kindergartens and schools. Her very first book was Barnehagene, de nye misjonsmarkene, forwarding the claim that missionary activity was taking place in Norwegian kindergartens. She followed up with Tvang til barnetro.

In writing her hobby books, she stated that she learned each individual craft while writing the books. Initially, she became especially known for books on modelling and decorating with salt dough, expanding with books on cernit modelling, crafts and decorations made of stones, shells, driftwood, flowers (and therefore also writing on gardening); painting, quilting and making Christmas decorations.

Den norske trolldeigboken had sold 64,000 copies by late 1989. In the same year, Joner issued a comprehensive book about hobbies, Den store norske hobbyboken together with Lise Jacobsen. In 1991, she wrote a book on saving and conserving, entailing a large number of techniques and tips including repair, cleaning, stain removal, food conservation, energy saving, cheap activities, and making homemade products (such as homemade glue) instead of buying.

She issued guitar learning books with her son Simen Joner, and later took up ukulele instruction. She issued books and held courses together with her husband Pelle Joner. They resided at Hovseter.

Joner praised her membership in the Norwegian Association of Non-Fiction Writers (NFFO), stating that without them, "she had stopped writing after the first book". In 2017, after self-releasing a book that criticized the teaching of religion in primary and lower secondary schools, she was punished by the NFFO for not running her manuscript through a consultant—which is mandatory for books that receive NFFO grants.
