= Plasticine =

Brand of modeling clay

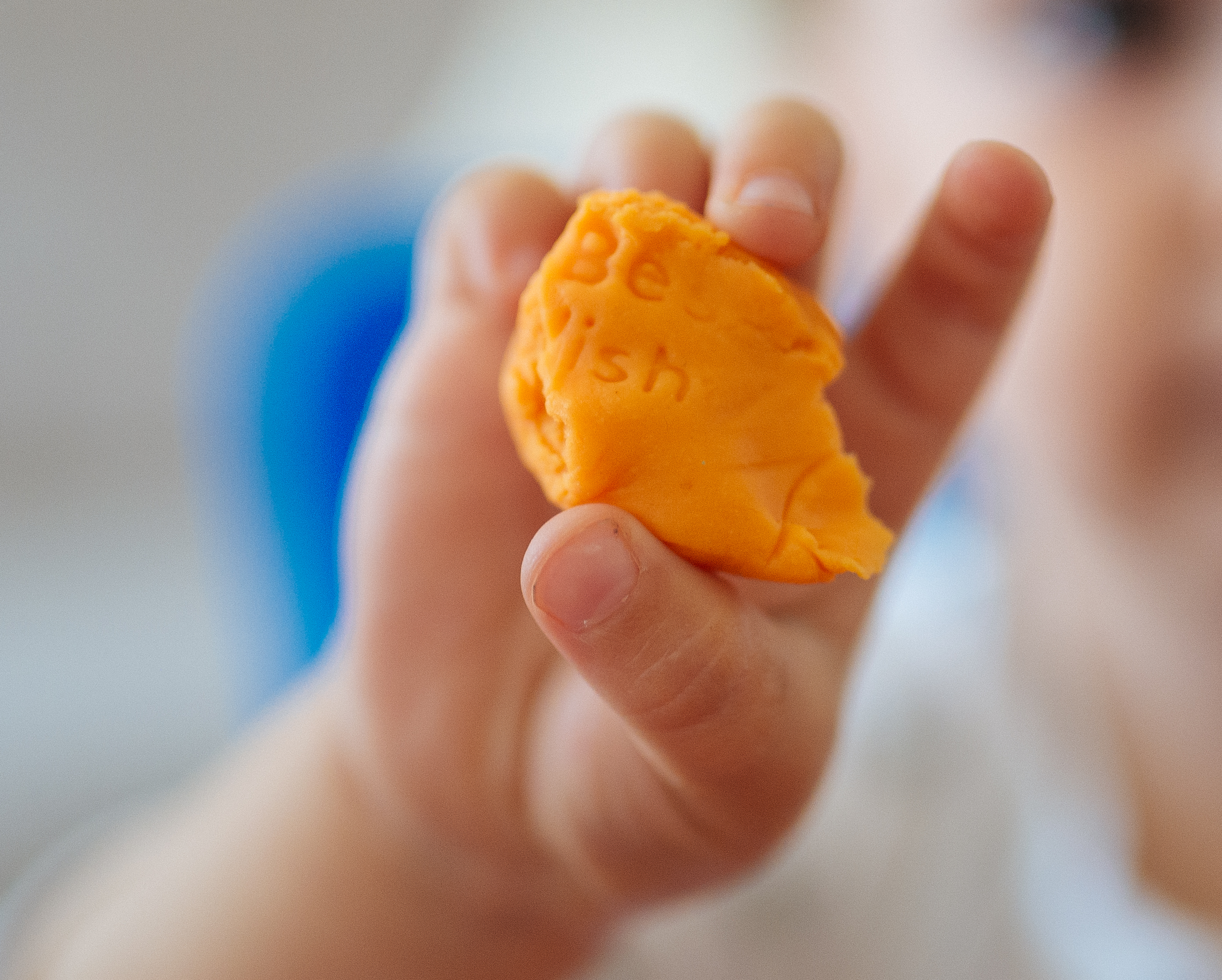
- Type: Modelling clay
- Invented by: William Harbutt
- Company: Harbutt
- Country: United Kingdom
- Availability: 1900–present

Plasticine is a putty-like modelling material made from calcium salts, petroleum jelly and aliphatic acids. Though originally a brand name for the British product, it was later used generically in English as a product category for other formulations.

Plasticine is used for children's play and as a modelling medium for more formal or permanent structures. Because of its non-drying property, it is commonly chosen for stop motion animation, including several Academy Award–winning films by Nick Park.

== History ==
Franz Kolb, owner of a pharmacy in Munich, Germany, invented an oil-based modelling clay in 1880. At the time, the city was a centre for the arts, and among Kolb's circle of friends were sculptors. They complained about how the clay they were using for modelling their sculptures would dry too fast and that, particularly in winter, it was too difficult to work with. In order to commercialize his invention, he presented it to the Faber-Castell company in 1887, which then used the name "Kunst-Modellierthon" (known as Plastilin), where it is still sold under the name "Münchner Künstler Plastilin" (Munich artists' Plastilin). In Italy, the product Pongo is also marketed as "plastilina" and shares the main attributes of Plasticine.

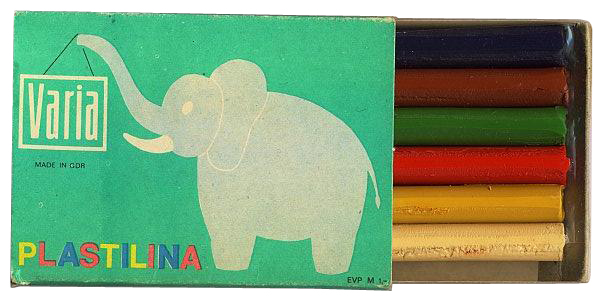
East German Plastilina

Plasticine is approximately 65% bulking agent (principally gypsum), 10% petroleum jelly, 5% lime, 10% lanolin and 10% stearic acid. It cannot be hardened by firing, it melts when exposed to heat, and is flammable at higher temperatures. In France, it is made by Herbin, and marketed as Plastiline. In Spain, toy manufacturer Jovi markets a product also branded "Plastilina", made from vegetable matter which makes it lighter. Play-Doh, which is based on flour, salt and water, dries on exposure to air.

=== Harbutt ===
William Harbutt, an art teacher in Bath, England, formulated Plasticine in 1897. Harbutt wanted a non-drying clay for his sculpture students. He created a non-toxic, sterile, soft and malleable clay that did not dry when exposed to air.

Harbutt received a patent in 1899 and commercial production started at a factory in Bathampton in 1900. The original Plasticine was grey, but four colours were produced for initial sales to the public. Plasticine was used by children and was often bought by schools for teaching art. It has found a wide variety of other uses (for example moulding casts for plaster, and plastics).

Harbutt patented a different formulation in 1915, which added wool fibres to give plasticine a stronger composition intended for ear plugs, and as a sterile dressing for wounds and burns. The Harbutt company marketed Plasticine as a children's toy by producing modelling kits based on characters from children's stories, such as Noddy, the Mr. Men and Paddington Bear.

The original Plasticine factory was destroyed by fire in 1963 and replaced by a modern building. The Harbutt company produced Plasticine in Bathampton until 1983, when production was moved to Thailand.

The Colorforms company was the major American licensee of Plasticine from 1979 until at least 1984. The use of a different chalk compound caused a product inconsistency, and the US version was considered inferior to the original mix.

Bluebird Toys plc acquired Plasticine through its purchase of Peter Pan Playthings Ltd, Harbutt's parent company. In 1998, Mattel bought Bluebird and the brand was sold to Humbrol Ltd, known for its model paints and owner of the Airfix model kit brand. Flair Leisure licensed the brand from Humbrol in 2005 and relaunched Plasticine. It acquired the brand outright, when Humbrol entered administration a year later.

== Uses ==
=== Current ===
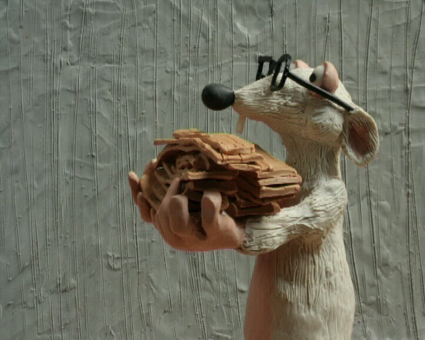
A Plasticine model of an anthropomorphic rat character, by Polish animator Monika Kuczyniecka

Plasticine is one type of clay used in claymation. One of its main proponents is Aardman Animations' Nick Park, who used characters modelled in Plasticine in his four Oscar-winning Wallace and Gromit short films A Grand Day Out (1989), The Wrong Trousers (1993), A Close Shave (1995) and A Matter of Loaf and Death (2008), as well as the feature films The Curse of the Were-Rabbit (2005) and Vengeance Most Fowl (2024). Plasticine-like materials are appealing to animators because the material can be used with ease: it is mouldable enough to create a character, flexible enough to allow that character to move in many ways, and dense enough to retain its shape easily when combined with a wire armature, and does not melt under hot studio lighting.

Plasticine is used in long jump and triple jump competitions to help officials determine if the competitors are making legal jumps. A 10-centimetre-wide (3.9 in) 'indicator board' is placed beyond and slightly above the take-off line. The edges of this are chamfered and edged with plasticine. If an athlete leaves a mark in the plasticine, it is considered proof that the jump was a foul, and the attempt is not measured. Plasticine is used rather than sand, so that several boards may be prepared in advance: if a board is marked it may be replaced by a smoothed board immediately to avoid delaying the competition, but keeping the marked board available in case of challenges. An indicator board is used, rather than a wide strip of plasticine, as this provides a firm footing should the athlete step on it.

Plasticine-like clays are also used in commercial party games such as Barbarossa.

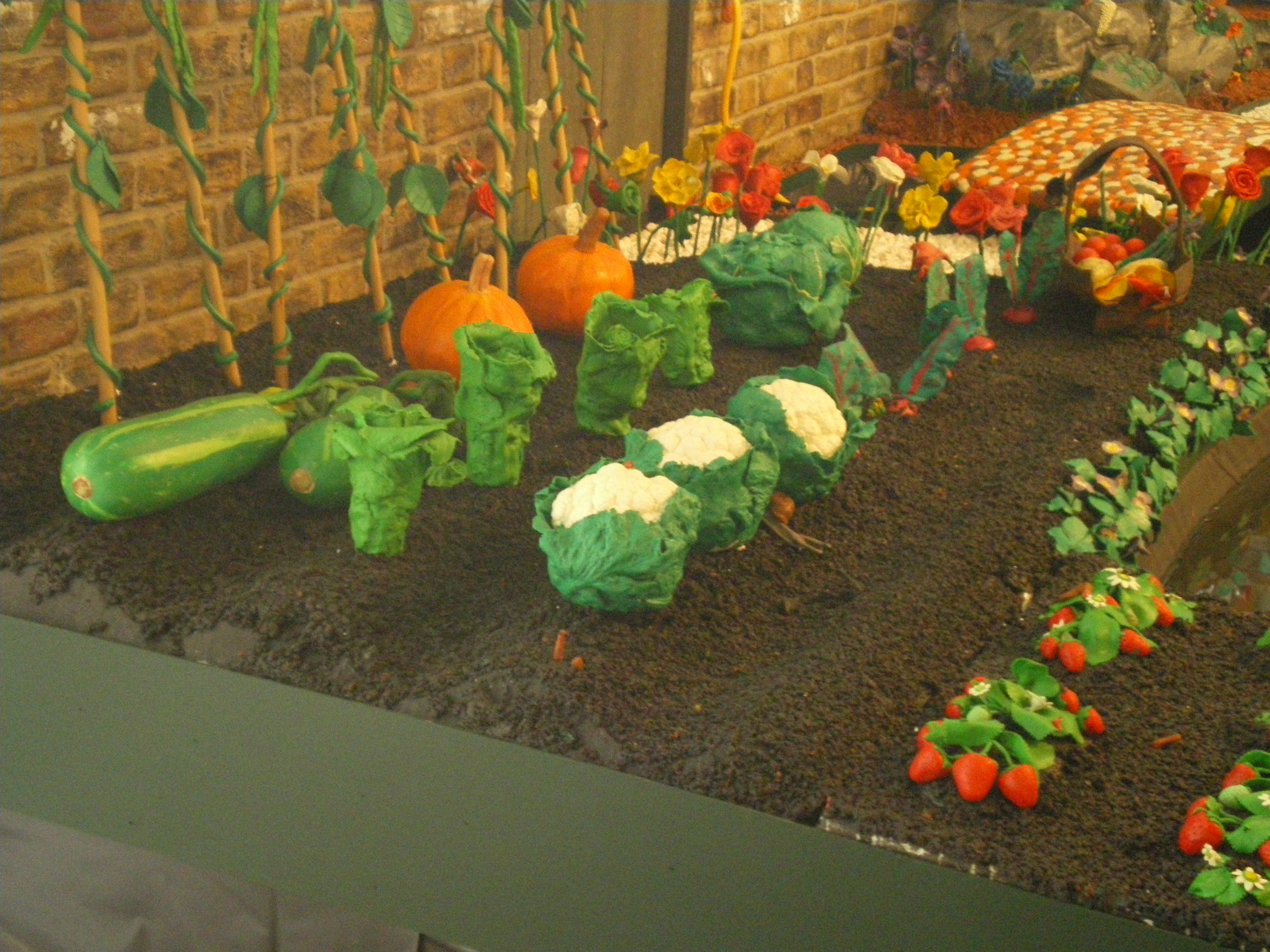
A life-size vegetable plot in James May's Paradise in Plasticine

Television presenter James May, together with Chris Collins, Jane McAdam Freud, Julian Fullalove and around 2,000 members of the public, created a show garden made entirely of Plasticine for the 2009 Chelsea Flower Show. Called "Paradise in Plasticine", it took 6 weeks and 2.6 tons of Plasticine in 24 colours to complete. May said, "This is, to our knowledge, the largest and most complex model of this type ever created." It couldn't be considered as part of the standard judging criteria, as it contained no real plants, but was awarded an honorary gold award made from Plasticine. The garden won the Royal Horticultural Society's 'peoples choice' for best small garden.

Plasticine is used by geologists studying rock deformation. One study compared the performance of four German products: Beck's green and Beck's orange made by Beck's Plastilin, Gomaringen; Kolb brown made by Kolb, Hengersberg; and Weible special soft made by Weible KG, Schorndorf.

=== Historic ===
During World War II, Plasticine was used by bomb disposal officer Major John P. Hudson R.E. as part of the defuzing process for the new German "Type Y" battery-powered bomb fuze. The "Type Y" fuze has an anti-disturbance device that had to be disabled before the fuze could be removed. Plasticine was used to build a dam around the head of the fuze to hold some liquid oxygen. The liquid oxygen cooled the battery down to a temperature at which it would no longer function; with the battery out of commission, the fuze could be removed safely.

== See also ==
- Industrial plasticine
- Milliput
- Modelling clay
- Sculpey
- Play-Doh
