= Clay modeling =

Automobile prototype model made with clay

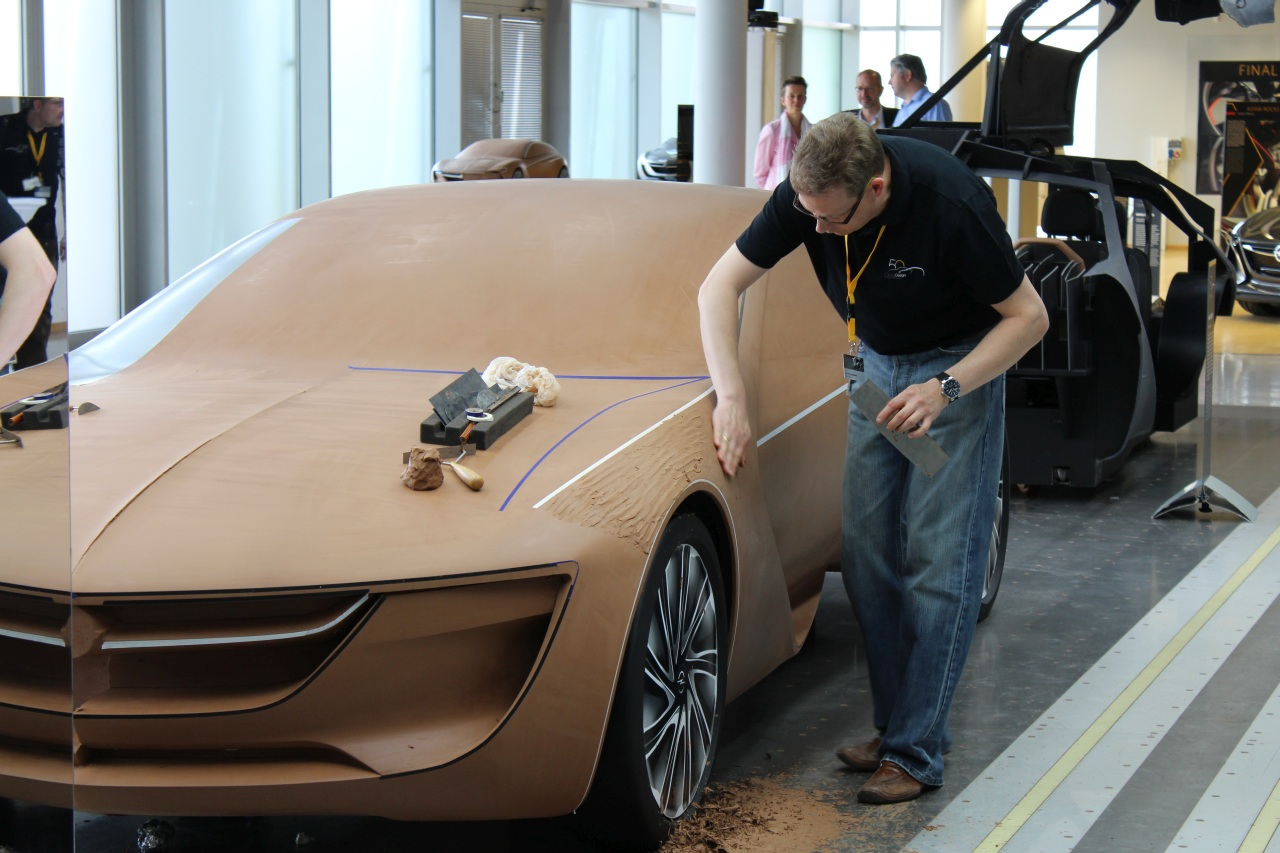
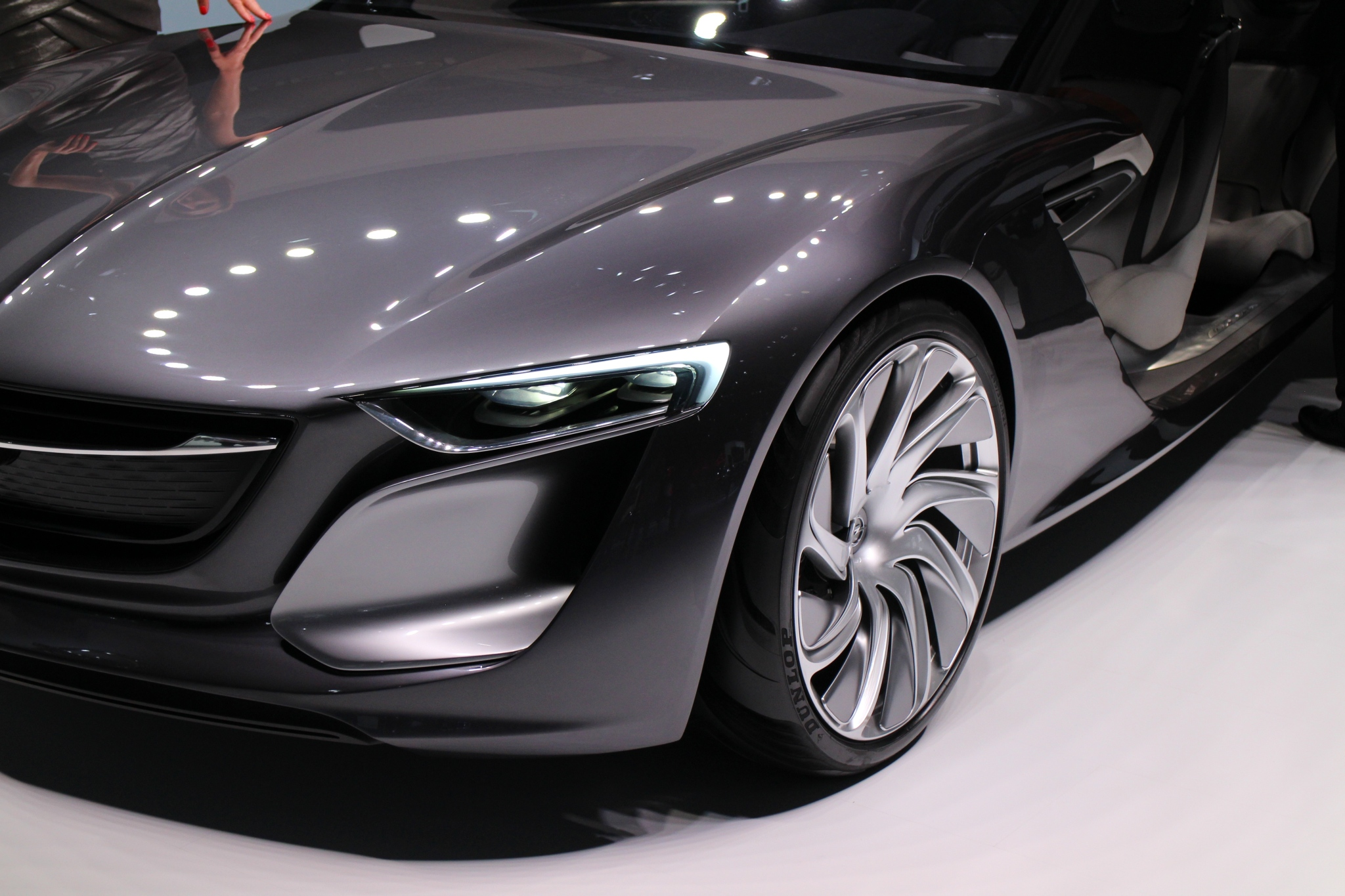
An example of full scale clay modeling (left) and completed automobile (right).

Clay modeling (or clay model making) automobile prototypes was first introduced in the 1930s by automobile designer Harley Earl, head of the General Motors styling studio (known initially as the Art and Color Section, and later as the Design and Styling Department).

The design method prior had used wood and metal, a process that required more time.

Clay modeling is adopted throughout the industry and remains in use today, with designers and modelers using this method to refine their ideas, and for leadership for decision making, with high levels of confidentiality.

Industrial plasticine or "clay" used for this purpose, is a material that can be easily shaped, thus enabling designers to create models to visualize a product.

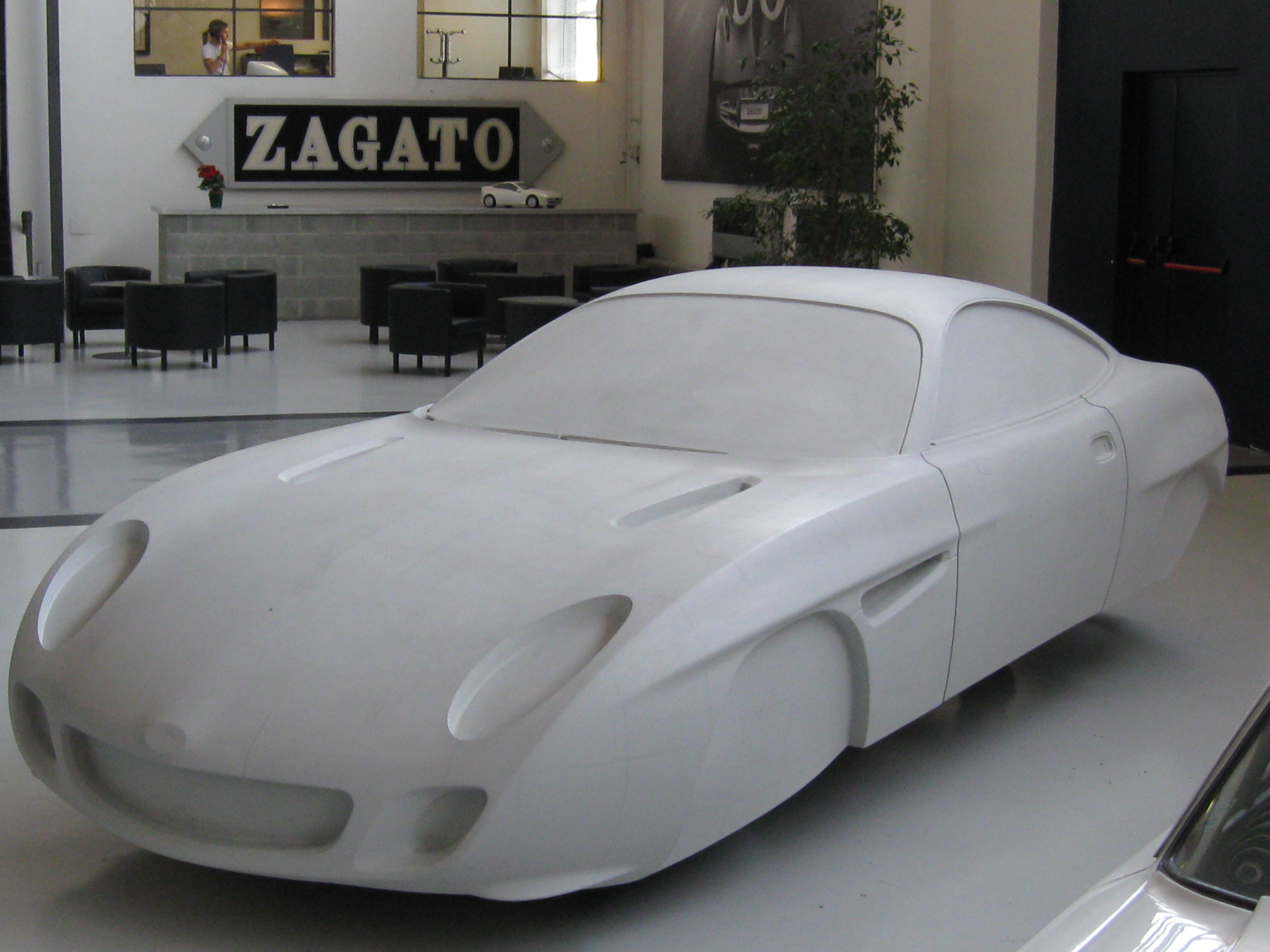
Clay model seen in Zagato design studio (2009)

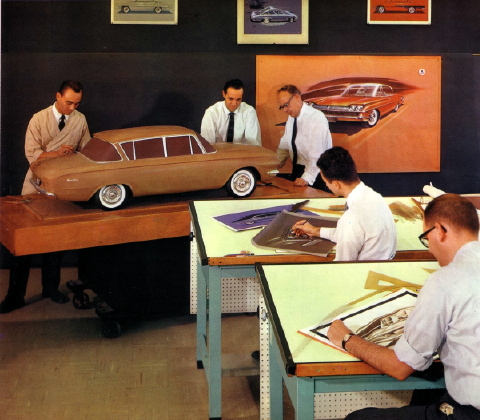
AMC designers with clay model (1961)
