= Clay =

Fine grained natural soil

Clay is a type of fine-grained natural soil material containing clay minerals (hydrous aluminium phyllosilicates, e.g. kaolinite, Al_{2}Si_{2}O_{5}(OH)_{4}). Most pure clay minerals are white or light-coloured, but natural clays show a variety of colours from impurities, such as a reddish or brownish colour from small amounts of iron oxide.

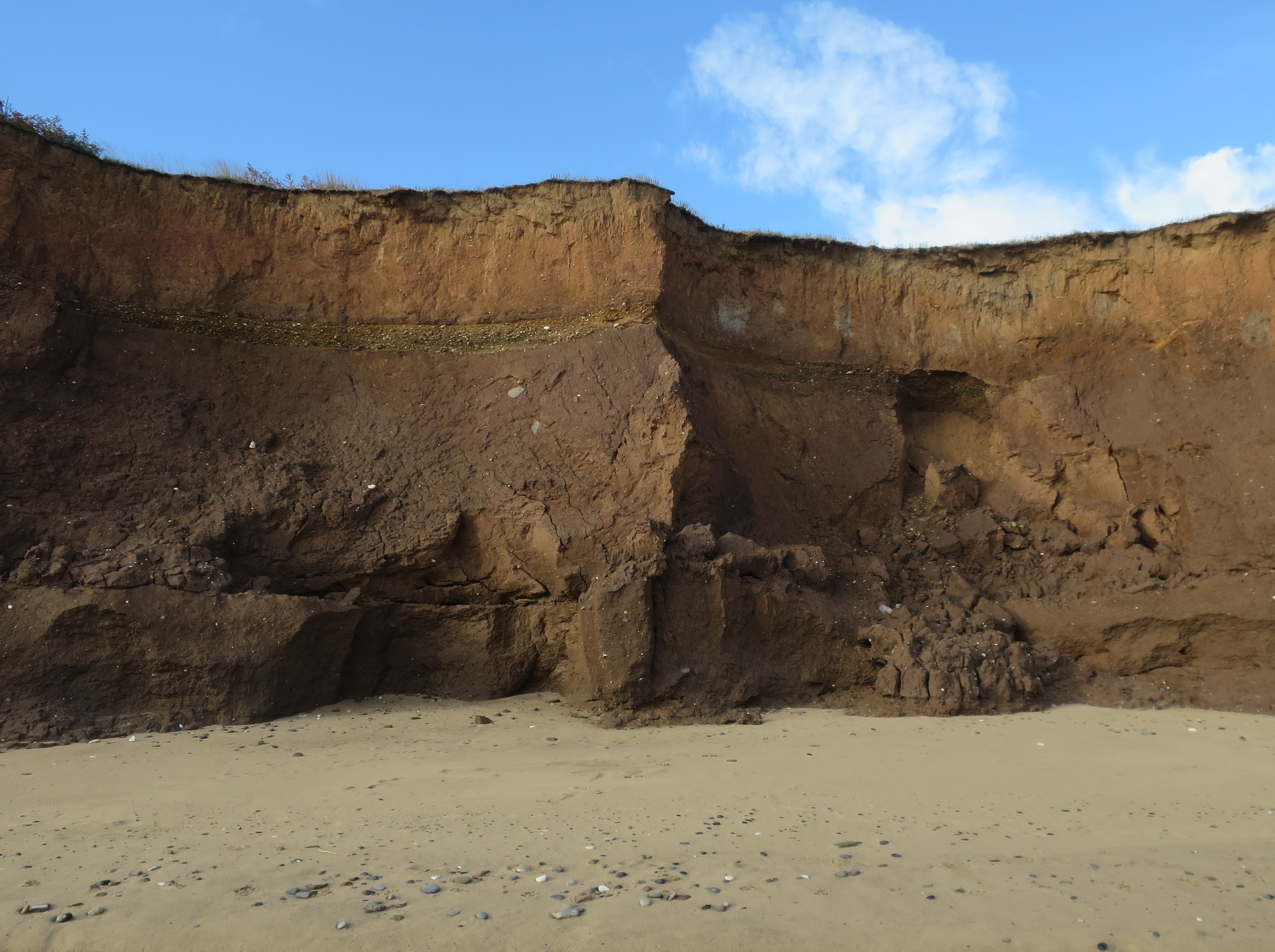
Boulder clay cliff south of Withernsea, England

Clays develop plasticity when wet but can be hardened through firing. Clay is the longest-known ceramic raw material. Prehistoric humans discovered the useful properties of clay and used it for making pottery. Some of the earliest pottery shards have been dated to around 14,000 BCE, and clay tablets were the first known writing medium. Clay is used in many modern industrial processes, such as paper making, cement production, and chemical filtering. Between one-half and two-thirds of the world's population live or work in buildings made with clay, often baked into brick, as an essential part of its load-bearing structure. In agriculture, clay content is a major factor in determining land arability. Clay soils are generally less suitable for crops due to poor natural drainage; however, clay soils are more fertile, due to higher cation-exchange capacity.

Clay is a very common substance. Shale, formed largely from clay, is the most common sedimentary rock. Although many naturally occurring deposits include both silts and clay, clays are distinguished from other fine-grained soils by differences in size and mineralogy. Silts, which are fine-grained soils that do not include clay minerals, tend to have larger particle sizes than clays. Mixtures of sand, silt and less than 40% clay are called loam. Soils high in swelling clays (expansive clay), which are clay minerals that readily expand in volume when they absorb water, are a major challenge in civil engineering.

== Properties ==
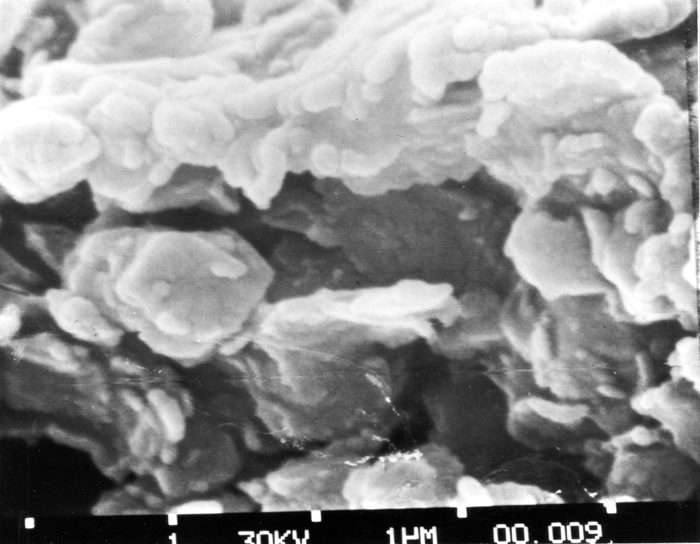
A 23,500 times magnified electron micrograph of smectite clay

The defining mechanical property of clay is its plasticity when wet and its ability to harden when dried or fired. Clays show a broad range of water content within which they are highly plastic, from a minimum water content (called the plastic limit) where the clay is just moist enough to mould, to a maximum water content (called the liquid limit) where the moulded clay is just dry enough to hold its shape. The plastic limit of kaolinite clay ranges from about 36% to 40% and its liquid limit ranges from about 58% to 72%. High-quality clay is also tough, as measured by the amount of mechanical work required to roll a sample of clay flat. Its toughness reflects a high degree of internal cohesion.

Clay has a high content of clay minerals that give it its plasticity. Clay minerals are hydrous aluminium phyllosilicate minerals, composed of aluminium and silicon ions bonded into tiny, thin plates by interconnecting oxygen and hydroxide ions. These plates are tough but flexible, and in moist clay, they adhere to each other. The resulting aggregates give clay the cohesion that makes it plastic. In kaolinite clay, the bonding between plates is provided by a film of water molecules that hydrogen bond the plates together. The bonds are weak enough to allow the plates to slip past each other when the clay is being moulded, but strong enough to hold the plates in place and allow the moulded clay to retain its shape after it is moulded. When the clay is dried, most of the water molecules are removed, and the plates form direct hydrogen bonds with each other, making the dried clay rigid but still fragile. If the clay is moistened again, it will once more become plastic. When the clay is fired to the earthenware stage, a dehydration reaction removes additional water from the clay, causing clay plates to irreversibly adhere to each other via stronger covalent bonding, which strengthens the material. The clay mineral kaolinite is transformed into a non-clay material, metakaolin, which remains rigid and hard if moistened again. Further firing through the stoneware and porcelain stages further recrystallizes the metakaolin into yet stronger minerals such as mullite.

The tiny size and plate form of clay particles gives clay minerals a high surface area. In some clay minerals, the plates carry a negative electrical charge that is balanced by a surrounding layer of positive ions (cations), such as sodium, potassium, or calcium. If the clay is mixed with a solution containing other cations, these can swap places with the cations in the layer around the clay particles, which gives clays a high capacity for ion exchange. The chemistry of clay minerals, including their capacity to retain nutrient cations such as potassium and ammonium, is important to soil fertility.

Clay is a common component of sedimentary rock. Shale is formed largely from clay and is the most common of sedimentary rocks. However, most clay deposits are impure. Many naturally occurring deposits include both silts and clay. Clays are distinguished from other fine-grained soils by differences in size and mineralogy. Silts, which are fine-grained soils that do not include clay minerals, tend to have larger particle sizes than clays. There is, however, some overlap in particle size and other physical properties. The distinction between silt and clay varies by discipline. Geologists and soil scientists usually consider the separation to occur at a particle size of 2 μm (clays being finer than silts), sedimentologists often use 4–5 μm, and colloid chemists use 1 μm. Clay-size particles and clay minerals are not the same, despite a degree of overlap in their respective definitions. Geotechnical engineers distinguish between silts and clays based on the plasticity properties of the soil, as measured by the soils' Atterberg limits. ISO 14688 grades clay particles as being smaller than 2 μm and silt particles as being larger. Mixtures of sand, silt and less than 40% clay are called loam.

Some clay minerals (such as smectite) are described as swelling clay minerals, because they have a great capacity to take up water, and they increase greatly in volume when they do so. When dried, they shrink back to their original volume. This produces distinctive textures, such as mudcracks or "popcorn" texture, in clay deposits. Soils containing swelling clay minerals (such as bentonite) pose a considerable challenge for civil engineering, because swelling clay can break foundations of buildings and ruin road beds.

=== Agriculture ===
Clay is generally considered undesirable for agriculture, although some amount of clay is a necessary component of good soil. Compared to other soils, clay soils are less suitable for crops due to their tendency to retain water, and require artificial drainage and tillage to make suitable for planting. However, clay soils are often more fertile and can hold onto nutrients better due to their higher cation-exchange capacity, allowing more land to remain in production rather than being left fallow. As clay tends to retain nutrients for longer before leaching them, this also means plants may require more fertilizer in clay soils.

== Formation ==
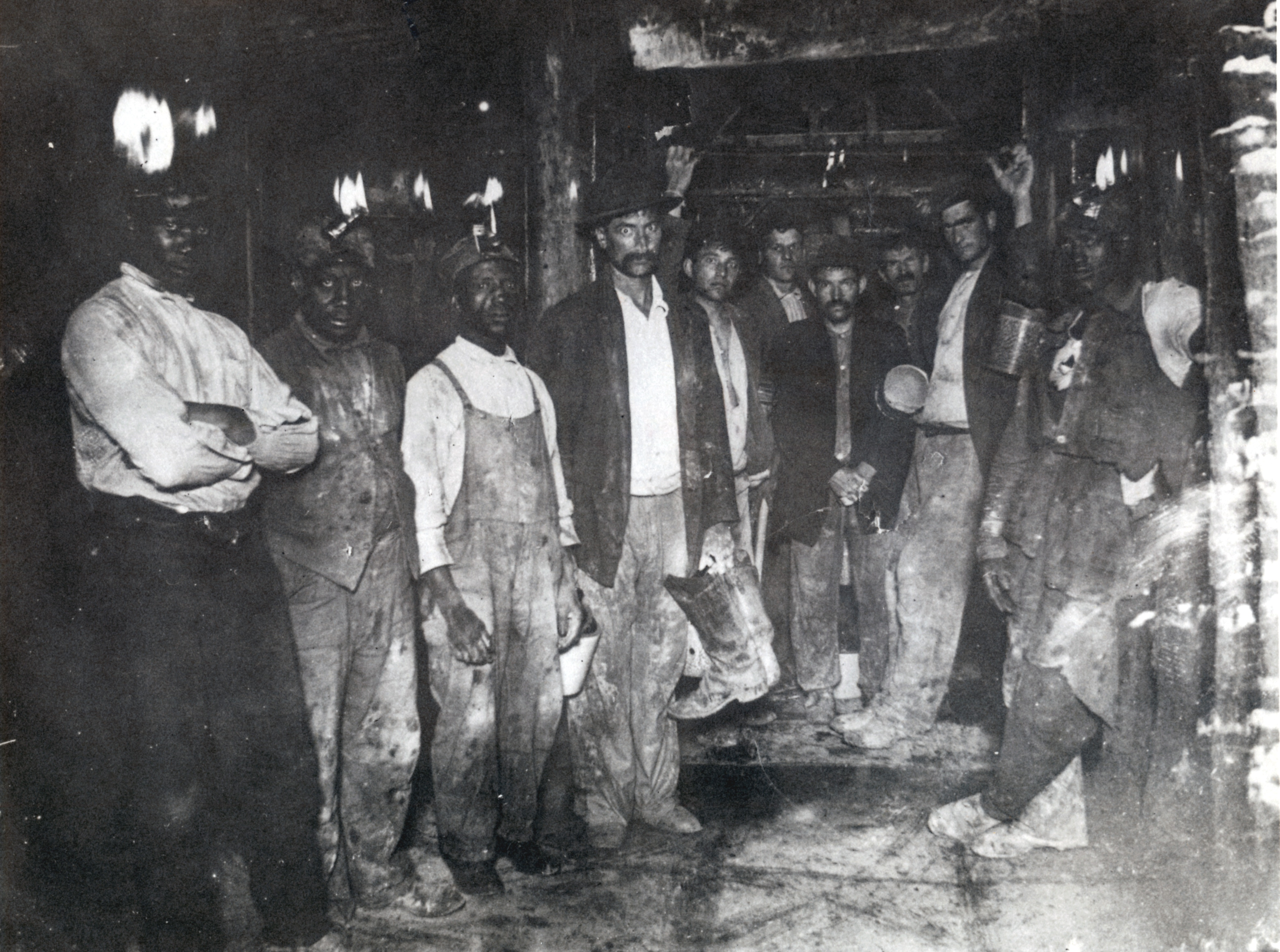
Italian and African-American clay miners in mine shaft, 1910

Clay minerals most commonly form by prolonged chemical weathering of silicate-bearing rocks. They can also form locally from hydrothermal activity. Chemical weathering takes place largely by acid hydrolysis due to low concentrations of carbonic acid, dissolved in rainwater or released by plant roots. The acid breaks bonds between aluminium and oxygen, releasing other metal ions and silica (as a gel of orthosilicic acid).

The clay minerals formed depend on the composition of the source rock and the climate. Acid weathering of feldspar-rich rock, such as granite, in warm climates tends to produce kaolin. Weathering of the same kind of rock under alkaline conditions produces illite. Smectite forms by weathering of igneous rock under alkaline conditions, while gibbsite forms by intense weathering of other clay minerals.

There are two types of clay deposits: primary and secondary. Primary clays form as residual deposits in soil and remain at the site of formation. Secondary clays are clays that have been transported from their original location by water erosion and deposited in a new sedimentary deposit. Secondary clay deposits are typically associated with very low energy depositional environments such as large lakes and marine basins.

== Varieties ==
The main groups of clays include kaolinite, montmorillonite-smectite, and illite. Chlorite, vermiculite, talc, and pyrophyllite are sometimes also classified as clay minerals. There are approximately 30 different types of "pure" clays in these categories, but most "natural" clay deposits are mixtures of these different types, along with other weathered minerals. Clay minerals in clays are most easily identified using X-ray diffraction rather than chemical or physical tests.

Varve (or varved clay) is clay with visible annual layers that are formed by seasonal deposition of those layers and are marked by differences in erosion and organic content. This type of deposit is common in former glacial lakes. When fine sediments are delivered into the calm waters of these glacial lake basins away from the shoreline, they settle to the lake bed. The resulting seasonal layering is preserved in an even distribution of clay sediment banding.

Quick clay is a unique type of marine clay indigenous to the glaciated terrains of Norway, North America, Northern Ireland, and Sweden. It is a highly sensitive clay, prone to liquefaction, and has been involved in several deadly landslides.

== Uses ==
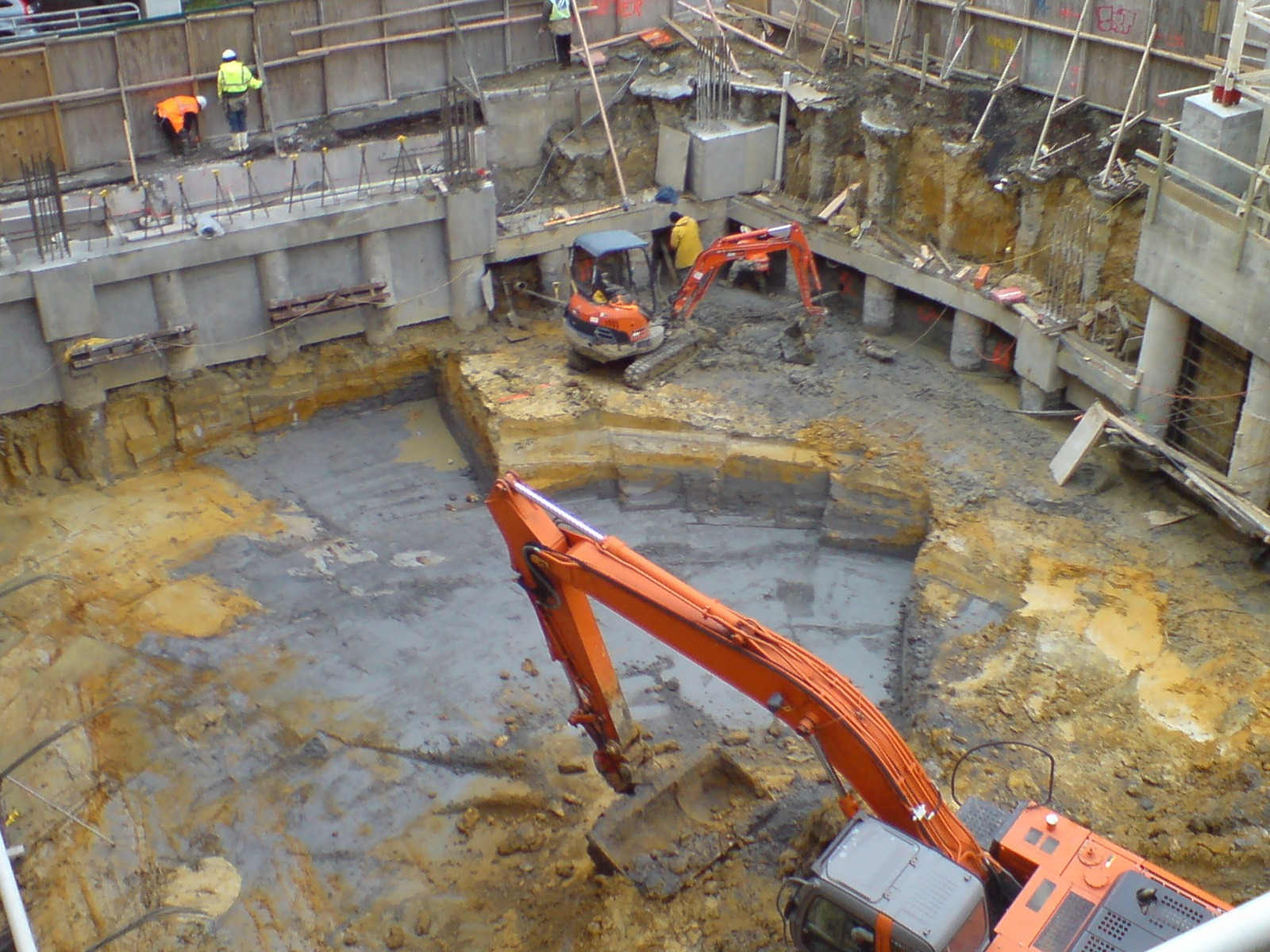
Clay layers in a construction site in Auckland, New Zealand. Dry clay is normally much more stable than sand in excavations.

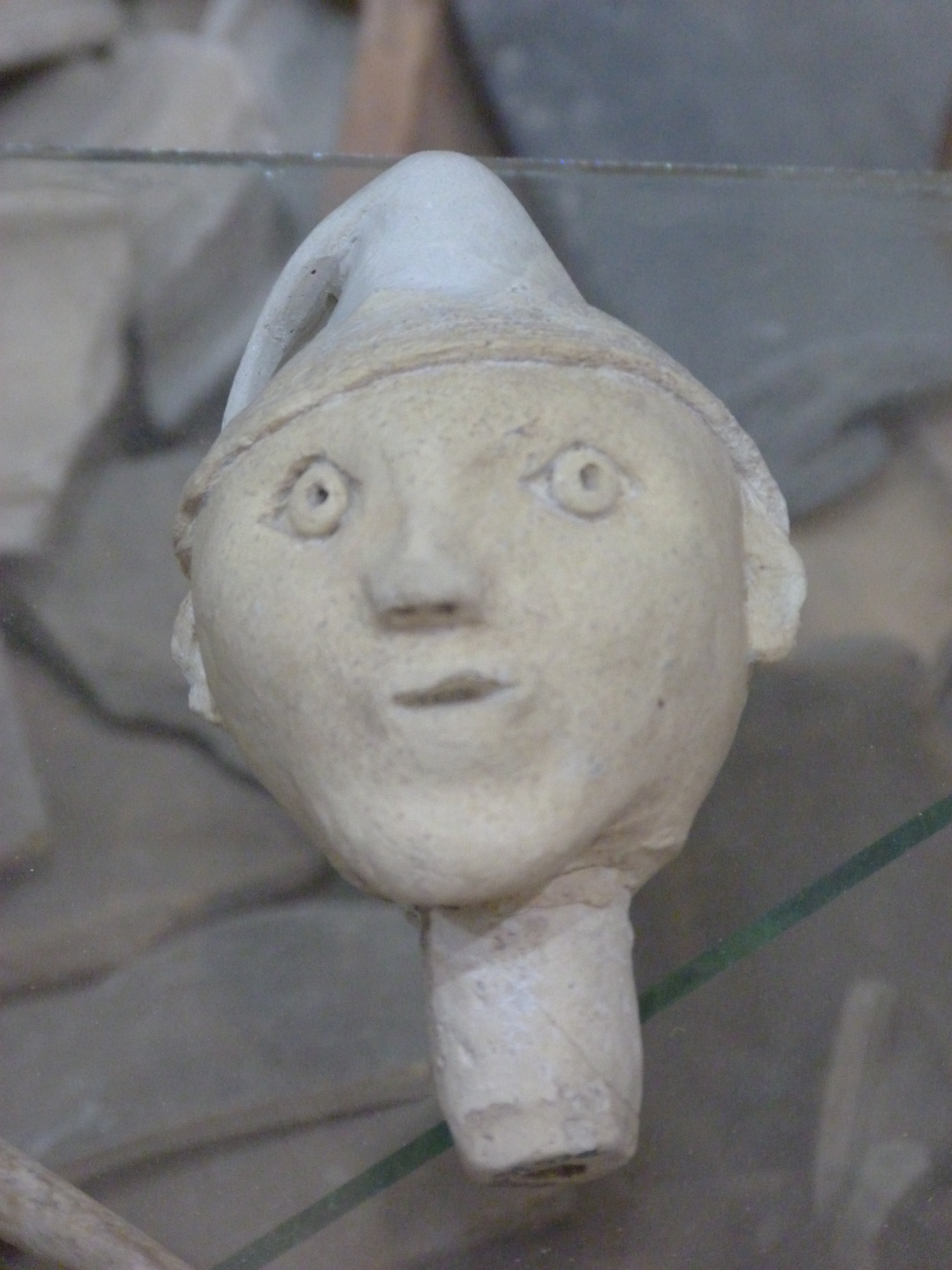
A 14th-century bottle stopper made of fired clay

Modelling clay is used in art and handicraft for sculpting. Clays are used for making pottery, both utilitarian and decorative, and construction products, such as bricks, walls, and floor tiles. Different types of clay, when used with different minerals and firing conditions, are used to produce earthenware, stoneware, and porcelain. Prehistoric humans discovered the useful properties of clay. Some of the earliest pottery shards recovered are from central Honshu, Japan. They are associated with the Jōmon culture, and recovered deposits have been dated to around 14,000 BCE. Cooking pots, art objects, dishware, smoking pipes, and even musical instruments such as the ocarina can all be shaped from clay before being fired.

Ancient peoples in Mesopotamia adopted clay tablets as the first known writing medium. Clay was chosen due to the local material being easy to work with and widely available. Scribes wrote on the tablets by inscribing them with a script known as cuneiform, using a blunt reed called a stylus, which effectively produced the wedge shaped markings of their writing. After being written on, clay tablets could be reworked into fresh tablets and reused if needed, or fired to make them permanent records. Nowadays, clay is added as a filler to graphite, in pencil lead, to change the hardness and blackness of the pencil. Purpose-made clay balls were used as sling ammunition. Clay is used in many industrial processes, such as paper making, cement production, and chemical filtering. Bentonite clay is widely used as a mold binder in the manufacture of sand castings.

Mass bathing in liquid clay
- as a type of relaxation
- Video (10 minutes) on YouTube

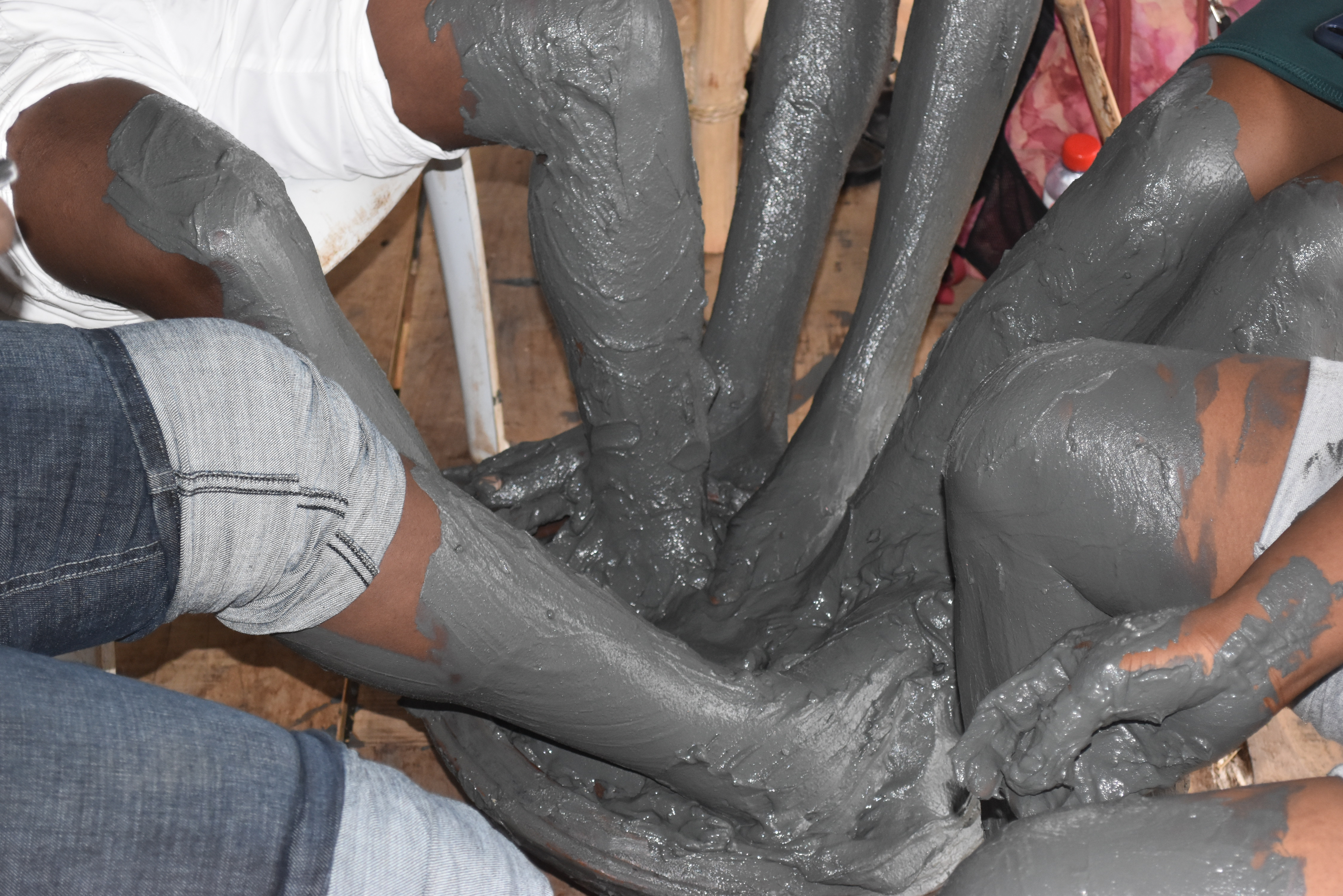
Clay bath near lake Ahémé in Benin

=== Materials ===
Clay is a common filler used in polymer nanocomposites. It can reduce the cost of the composite, as well as impart modified behavior: increased stiffness, decreased permeability, decreased electrical conductivity, etc.

=== Medicine ===
Traditional uses of clay as medicine go back to prehistoric times. An example is Armenian bole, which is used to soothe an upset stomach. Some animals such as parrots and pigs ingest clay for similar reasons. Kaolin clay and attapulgite have been used as anti-diarrheal medicines.

=== Construction ===
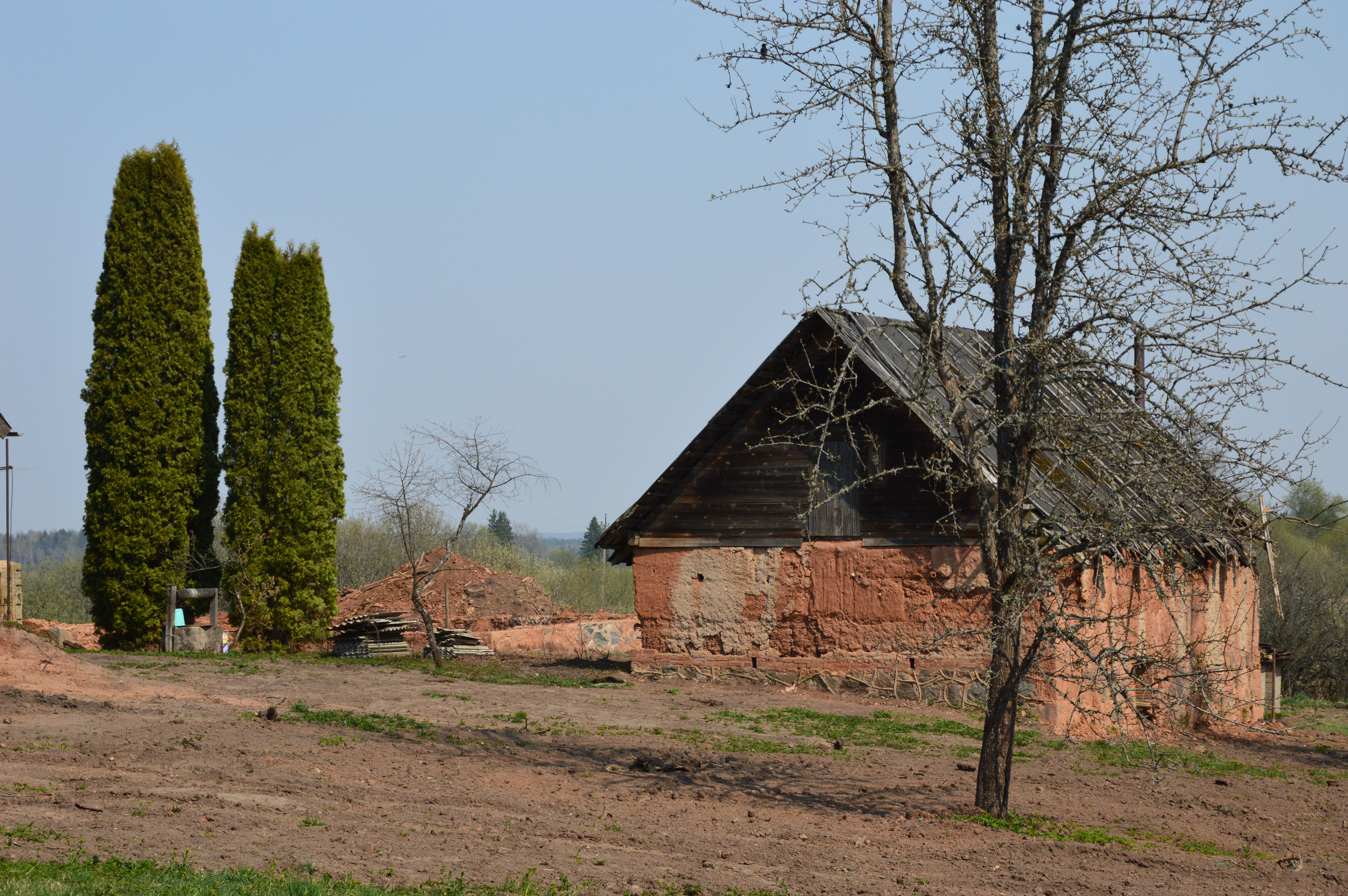
A clay building in South Estonia

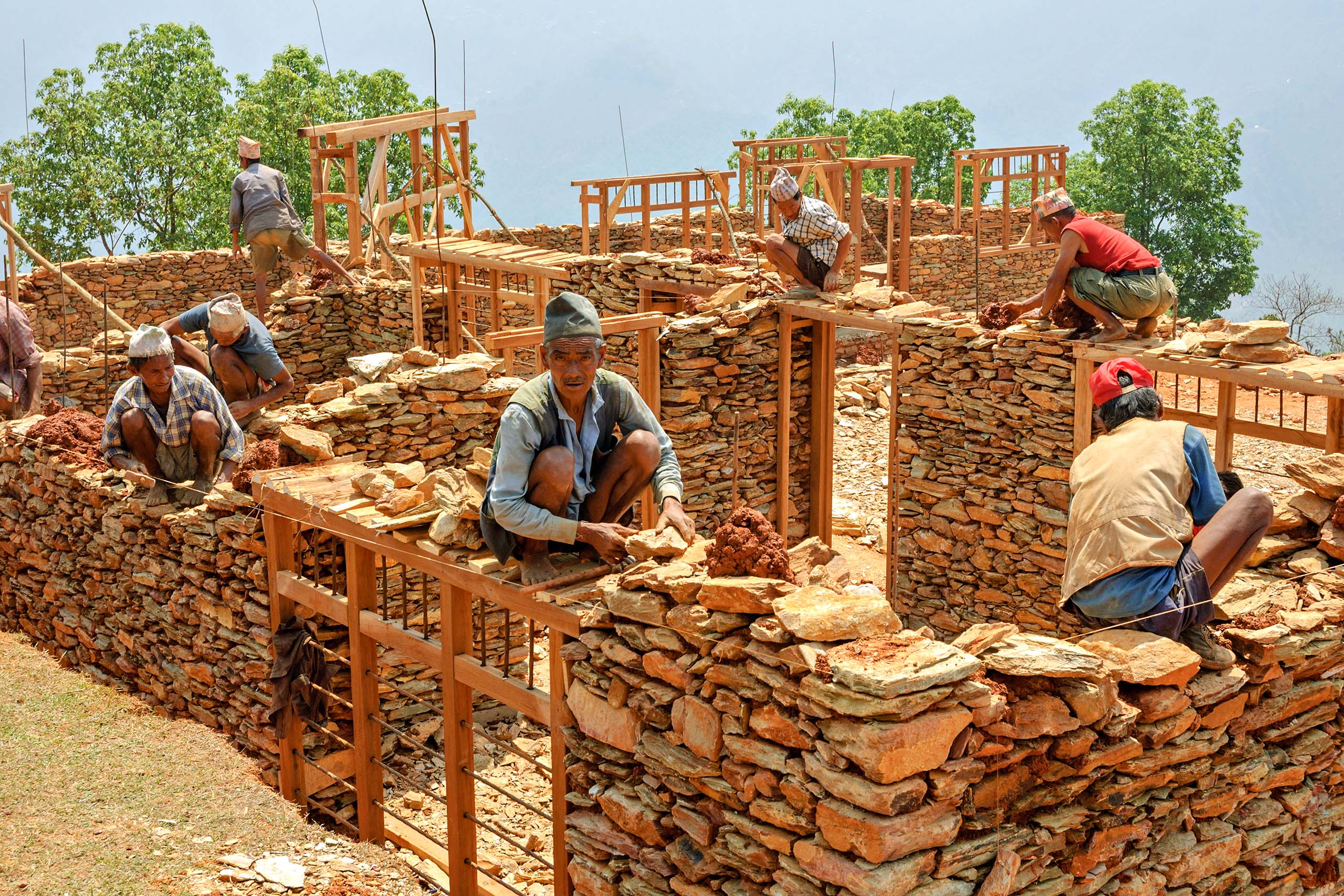
Clay as mortar with natural stone used by masons to build walls, Dhading, Nepal

Clay as the defining ingredient of loam is one of the oldest building materials on Earth, among other ancient, naturally occurring geologic materials such as stone and organic materials like wood. Between one-half and two-thirds of the world's population, in both traditional societies as well as developed countries, still live or work in buildings made with clay, often baked into brick, as an essential part of their load-bearing structure. Also a primary ingredient in many natural building techniques, clay is used to create adobe, cob, cordwood, and structures and building elements such as wattle and daub, clay plaster, clay render case, clay floors and clay paints and ceramic building material. Clay was used as a mortar in brick chimneys and stone walls where protected from water.

Clay, relatively impermeable to water, is also used where natural seals are needed, such as in pond linings, the cores of dams, or as a barrier in landfills against toxic seepage (lining the landfill, preferably in combination with geotextiles). Studies in the early 21st century have investigated clay's absorption capacities in various applications, such as the removal of heavy metals from waste water and air purification.

== See also ==
- Argillaceous minerals – Fine-grained aluminium phyllosilicates
- Industrial plasticine – Modeling material which is mainly used by automotive design studios
- Clay animation – Stop-motion animation made using malleable clay models
- Clay chemistry
- Clay court – Type of tennis court
- Clay panel – Building material made of clay with some additives
- Clay pit – Open-pit mining for the extraction of clay minerals
- Geophagia – Practice of eating earth or soil-like substrates
- London Clay – Low-permeable marine geological formation
- Modelling clay – Any of a group of malleable substances used in building and sculpting
- Paper clay – Clay with cellulose fiber
- Particle size – Notion for comparing dimensions of particles in different states of matter
- Plasticine – Brand of modeling clay
- Vertisol – Clay-rich soil, prone to cracking
- Clay–water interaction – Various progressive interactions between clay minerals and water
