= William Harbutt =

English artist, professor and inventor (1844 –1921)

William Harbutt (13 February 1844 – 1 June 1921) was an English artist and the inventor of Plasticine.

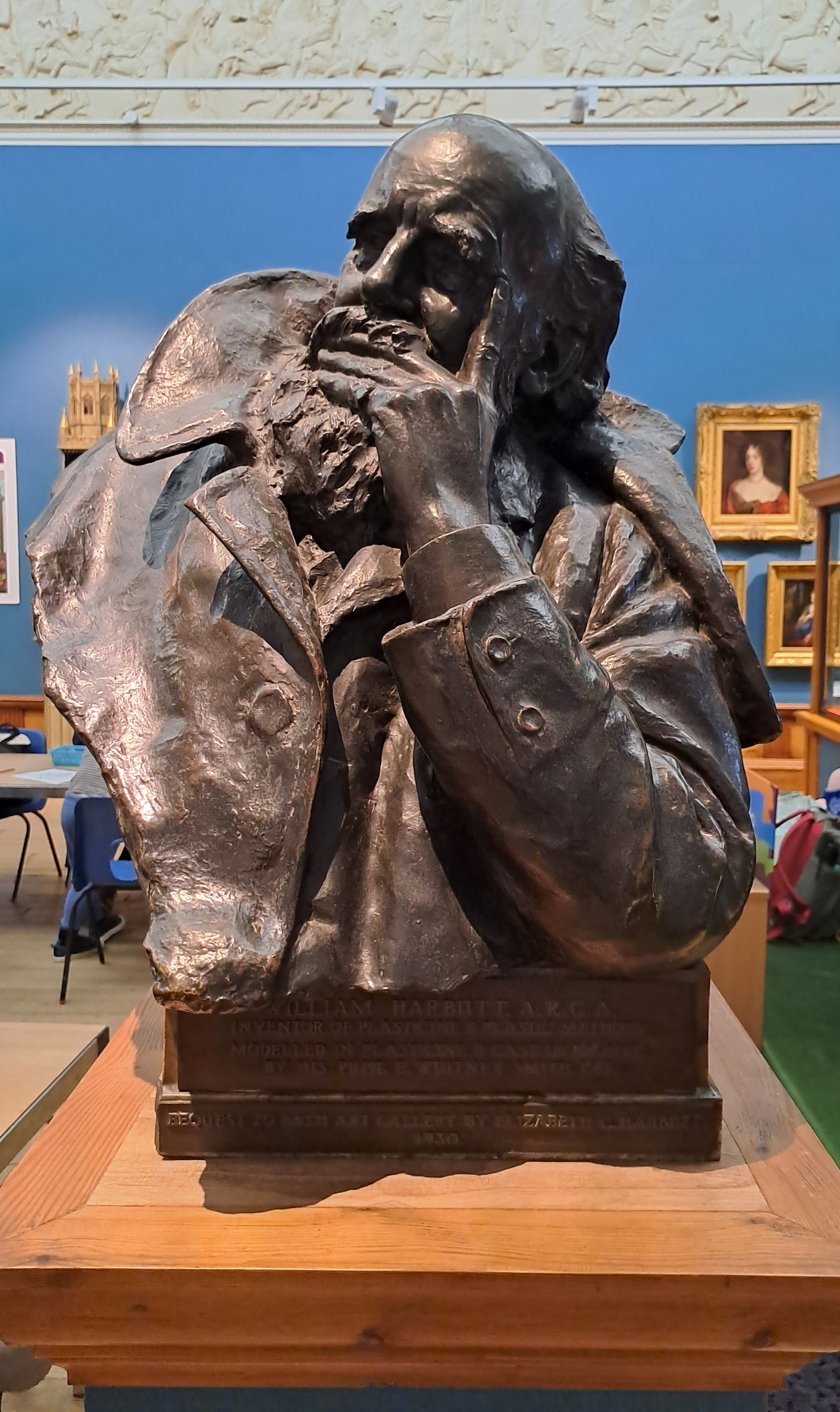
Sculpture of William Harbutt exhibited in the Victoria Gallery, Bath

== Early life ==
Born in North Shields, England, the son of Thomas Harbutt (5 August 1803 – 1880) and Elizabeth Whitehouse Jefcoate (27 June 1804 – 1883), Harbutt studied at the National Art Training School in London, and eventually became an associate of the Royal College of Art.

== Career ==
Harbutt was headmaster of the Bath School of Art and Design from 1874 to 1877. He then opened his own art school at The Paragon Art Studio, 15 Bladud Buildings, Bath with his wife Elizabeth "Bessie" Harbutt, a well-known miniature portrait artist who exhibited works at the Royal Academy of Art and the Chicago World's Fair, and in 1887, was commissioned by Queen Victoria to produce portraits of herself and her late husband Prince Albert.

== Plasticine ==
Harbutt invented Plasticine around 1897 as a non-drying modelling clay for use by his students. In 1899, Harbutt was awarded a trade mark, and in 1900, a factory was set up at nearby Bathampton to manufacture the product for commercial sale. Harbutt travelled widely to promote the product, and his theories about the teaching of art by allowing children free expression.

== Personal life ==
Harbutt was also a councillor on Bath rural district council and Bathampton parish council. He was a member of Bath New Church Society which followed the teachings of Emanuel Swedenborg,

He and Bessie had seven children, six of whom survived infancy and worked in the family business. The Harbutt company, owned and run by Harbutt's descendants, continued to manufacture Plasticine in Bathampton until 1983.

== Death ==
He developed a chill during the voyage aboard the Aquitania, which progressed into a severe cold, and was taken directly from the ship to hospital upon arrival in the United States. He died in 1921 in New York City from pneumonia.

He is buried near the old factory in the churchyard at St Nicholas’ Church, Bathampton.

== Memorials ==
The Paradise in Plasticine garden, a creation of journalist and presenter James May displayed at the 2009 Chelsea Flower Show included a bust of Harbutt sculpted by Jane McAdam Freud.

In 2009, his hometown of North Shields attempted to commemorate his legacy by commissioning some street furniture to resemble plasticine shapes and colour, made out of concrete. Unfortunately these had to be removed shortly after installation due to complaints from the public, as the street furniture retained pools of water in the seats after rain rendering them unusable or the user getting wet. In addition, they were not comfortable or practical and very problematic for elderly or infirm members of the public to get in to and up from. The 'plasticine' chairs were relocated throughout the region to less commercial areas including to the grounds of a local sixth form college and repainted from the plain plasticine colours to various colour schemes and designs. These remain in place (if rarely used or occupied). Traditional metal street furniture replaced the 'plasticine' furniture in the town centre of his birthplace.
