= Paper clay =

Clay with cellulose fiber

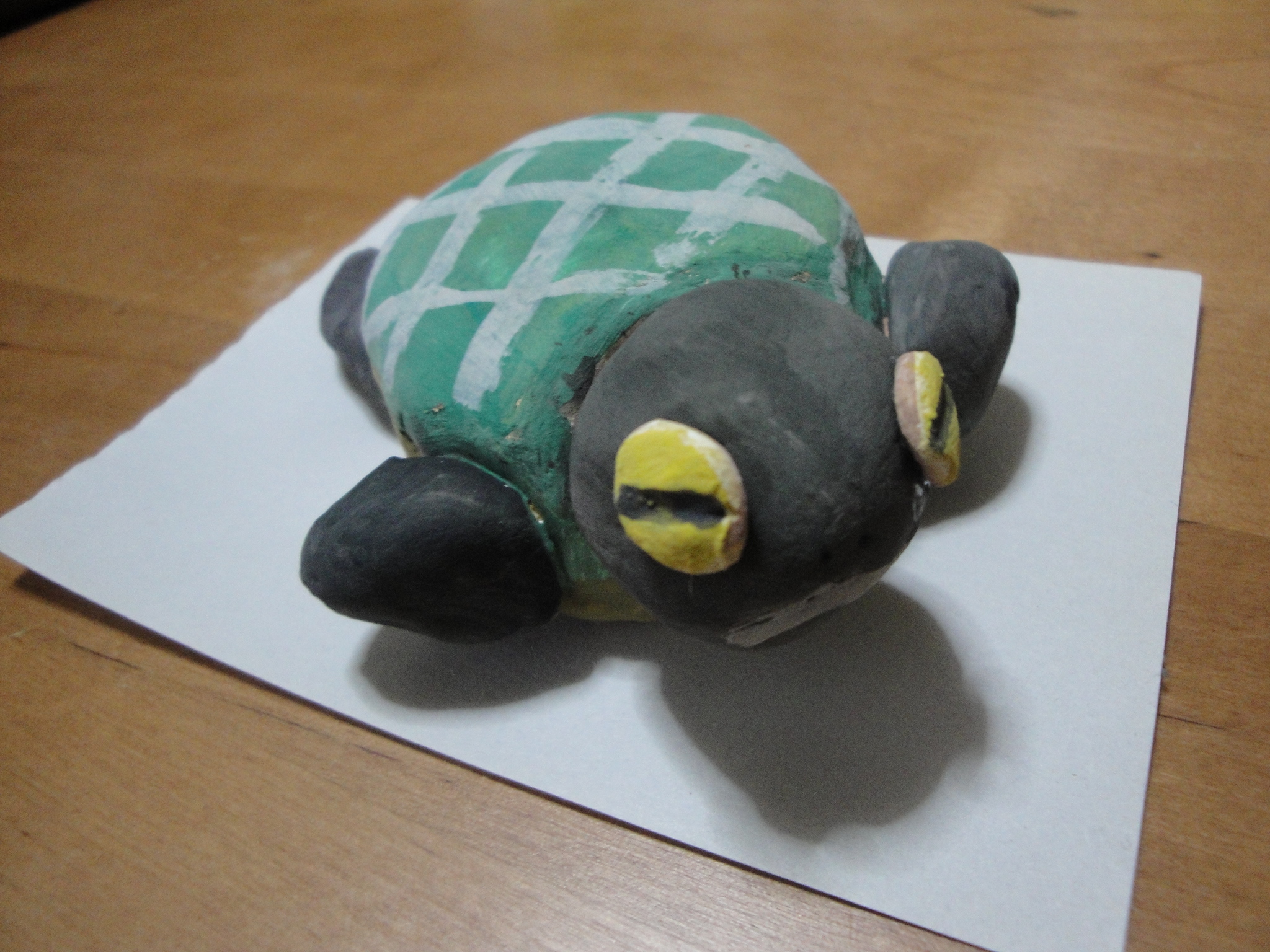
A paper clay turtle

Paper clay (sometimes referred to as fiberclay) is any clay body to which processed cellulose fiber (paper being the most common) has been added. (Note: Paper clay should be distinguished from Paperclay, a.k.a. Creative Paperclay, which is an air hardening, non-clay modelling material popular within the recreational arts, crafts, puppet and doll-maker communities. Paperclay is a registered trademark only within the U.S. (Patent and Trademark Office. Registration No. 1814872).)

== Properties and techniques ==
Earthenware, terra cotta, stoneware, porcelain and bone china clay bodies can be made into paper clay. The more fiber added to the clay body, the stronger the unfired dry paper clay, but the weaker the fired body. The less fiber added to the clay body, the weaker the unfired dry paper clay, but the stronger the fired body.

Conventional soft clay building techniques can be used with soft paper clay. This is because there is no physical difference between soft clay and the same clay as a soft paper clay, except the addition of a small percentage of tiny inert cellulose fibers. However, using less fiber in paper clay on the potter's wheel is recommended, particularly if the leather hard work is to be trimmed on the wheel. Paper clay can be made from left over throwing slip from wheel throwing. It is widely used by potters to repair cracks in dry, conventional clay, as well as dry paper clay.

Thinner and taller work can be built with partially dry or completely dry paper clay. Re-wetting paper clay is faster than re-wetting pure clay, as the paper fibres pull water more quickly into the clay body. The damp sections can then be joined. Accelerated drying of paper clay work is possible, and results in less warping and cracking, compared with drying conventional clay. The more fiber in the paper clay, the more rapid the drying with less warping and cracking, and the quicker dry-to-dry joins can be made.

Nonconventional clay techniques are now possible after adding processed cellulose fiber to any clay: First, joining dry-to-dry paper clay and dry-to-soft paper clay are the most radical new techniques. Secondly, metal supports and ceramic material may be used within paper clay, with less cracking than conventional clay.

A new aesthetic has also emerged from combining paper and clay art traditions. For example, dry paper clay is stronger than the same clay without the fiber, so work can be made thinner and more delicate.

Using paper clay requires less technical skill than conventional clay, so beginners can focus more on the creative expression of their ideas. For example, handles of soft paper clay can be added to a completely dry paper clay pot without distorting the form. Other forms built with coils no longer need to be correctly joined before drying, instead, after drying the form, paper clay slip may be applied to join the coils and fill any gaps. Breaks and cracks in both dry and fired paper clay work can be repaired with paper clay slip.

== Firing ==
The firing process for paper clay is similar to the firing of conventional clay. The clay still needs to be completely dry before firing so the change of water into steam does not cause the clay to explode. Maximum firing temperatures, firing schedules and types of glaze to use for paper clay are the same as those used for the specific clay used in the paper clay. Some recommend slightly higher firing temperatures. Because dry paper clay is more porous and has greater tensile strength than dry clay, single glaze firing is possible. Due to its higher dry tensile strength, there are fewer breakages during handling and kiln loading.

Replacing some of the clay with fiber will reduce the thermal mass of clay, in turn reducing further the energy required to fire the work. Changing to paper clay from conventional clay offers considerable energy, financial and time savings when firing ceramics in educational institutions.
