= Jane McAdam Freud =

British conceptual sculptor (1958–2022)

Jane McAdam Freud FRBS
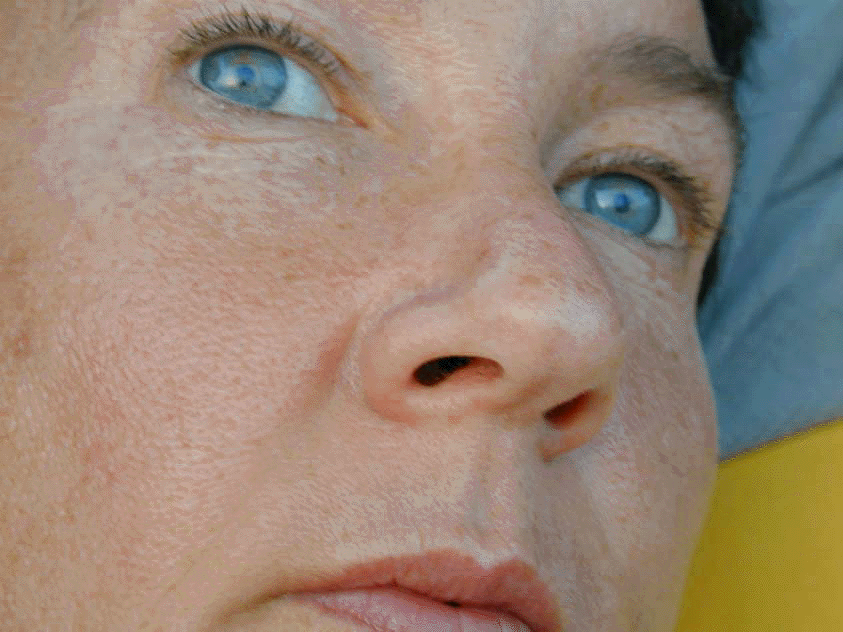
- Born: 24 February 1958; London, England
- Died: 9 August 2022 (aged 64)
- Education: Wimbledon College of Art; Central School of Art and Design; Royal College of Art (MA); Accademia di Belle Arti di Roma
- Known for: Conceptual sculpture; installation
- Spouse: Peter Henson
- Father: Lucian Freud
- Relatives: Sigmund Freud (great-grandfather)

Jane McAdam Freud FRBS (24 February 1958 – 9 August 2022) was a British conceptual sculptor working in installation art and digital media. She was the winner of the 2014 European Trebbia Awards for artistic achievement.

== Life and work ==
McAdam Freud was born in London to Katherine Margaret McAdam and Lucian Freud, and was the great-granddaughter of Sigmund Freud. Her career began with a solo show at the age of 18, curated by her art teachers at Putney College, which is now part of South Thames College. After completing a Foundation course at Wimbledon College of Art, McAdam Freud studied Mosaics in Ravenna from 1977 to 1978, returning to London to study at the Central School of Art and Design and at the Royal College of Art under the supervision of John Stezaker and Eduardo Paolozzi.

In 1986 McAdam Freud won the British Art Medal Scholarship in Rome where she studied sculpture at the Accademia di Belle Arti di Roma under Gino Marotta and at the Scuola d'Arte della Medaglia in Rome. McAdam Freud was an associate lecturer at Central Saint Martins and taught short courses in the Sculpture School at Morley College. She has also taught at the Royal College of Art, London and at the Royal Academy of Fine Arts, Antwerp.

McAdam Freud was a Fellow of the Royal British Society of Sculptors. In 1991 she was awarded the Italian State Mint prize for her work Moments and Memories; her winning design was put into production by the Istituto Poligrafico e Zecca dello Stato. In the same year she was granted the Freedom of the City of London. She has published several catalogues including; On the Edge (1996), Relative Relations (2006) and papers on art and Ppychoanalysis.

McAdam Freud's short film Dead or Alive refers to Freud's concept of Condensation. The pairings morph into each other through the merging back and forth of Freud's antiquities with her sculpture, from past to present 'virtually' closing the gap of time. At midway the two objects merge and form a third image of a 'virtual object. Her preference for this work was to locate it within reach of a psychoanalytically aware audience. Dead or Alive was shown at museums, institutes and galleries including Philoctetes Centre for the Imagination, NY, New York USA in 2008, Lung Yingtai Cultural Foundation, (Media Tek Lectures) Taipei, Taiwan and the Kosciuszko Foundation, NYC, USA in 2009. Also the Sundaram Tagore Gallery, LA, USA in 2010 and Whitelabs Gallery, Milan in 2012.

Her works are represented in public collections including the British Museum, the Victoria and Albert Museum, National Gallery Archives, London, the Ashmolean Museum, Oxford and the Fitzwilliam Museum, Cambridge. International collections include the Brooklyn Museum, The National Arts Club, Carnegie Museums of Pittsburgh, the Greek National Gallery, and the Berlin State Museums.

McAdam Freud lived in northwest London at the time of her death, and was married to architect Peter Henson. She died on 9 August 2022, aged 64; no cause was given.

== Solo exhibitions ==
- 1996: Yorkshire Museum, York
- 1997: Fitzwilliam Museum, Cambridge
- 1997: Hunterian Museum, Glasgow, Scotland
- 1998: Simmons Gallery, Bloomsbury, London
- 1998: Marishal Museum, Aberdeen, Scotland
- 1999: Forum for Contemporary Art, St. Louis, Missouri, USA
- 2000: Das Norske Veritas, London Bridge
- 2001: 'Resonating' The Gallery, University College Cork
- 2004: 'Give and Take' Ashmolean Museum, Oxford
- 2006: 'We Do' Adele Boag Gallery, Adelaide, Australia
- 2006: 'Relative Relations' Freud Museum
- 2006: 'Subject as Object' Beverley Knowles Fine Art, London
- 2007: 'Relative Relations' Harrow Museum, London
- 2007: 'Relative Reflections' Muzeum Novojičínska, Pribor, Czech Republic
- 2009: 'Repetitions' New York Psychoanalytic Society, NYC, USA
- 2009: 'Other Side' Harrow and Wembley Progressive Synagogue
- 2009: 'Repetitions' Kosciuszko Foundation NYC, USA
- 2009–10: 'Conceptual Sculpture' London Centre for Psychotherapy
- 2010: 'StoneSpeak' Freud Museum, London
- 2010: 'Freud on Freud' New Center of Psychoanalysis in LA, USA
- 2010: 'Random' Sundaram Tagore Gallery, LA, USA
- 2010: 'War Works' Centre for Jewish Culture, Kraków, Poland
- 2011: 'Random Plus' Sundaram Tagore Gallery, New York
- 2011: 'Hinged' Freud Museum of Dreams, St. Petersburg, Russia
- 2011: 'HiStory' Austria General Consulate Gallery, Cracow, Poland]
- 2012: 'Lucian Freud My Father' Freud Museum, London.
- 2012: 'Family Matters' Gazelli Art House, London, UK
- 2012: 'Flesh and Stone' New School House Gallery, York, UK
- 2012: '3 Generations' Whitelabs Gallery, Milan, Italy
- 2013: 'Family Matters' Gazelli Art House, Baku, Azerbaijan
- 2013: 'Taking Care' Palazzo Tagliaferro, Andora, Italy
- 2013: 'Dreaming and Doing' Pushkin Museum of Fine Art, Moscow
- 2014: 'Painted Earth' Harrow Arts Centre, London
- 2014: 'In My Own Image – Ill Fit' British Psychotherapy Foundation, London
- 2014 'In the Mould of the Fathers' C2 Contemporanea, Florence, Italy
- 2014: 'On Identity', Gallery Martini Ronchetti, Genoa, Italy
- 2014: 'Parallels' 2 man show with photographer Frank Dabba Smith at The Priory, Roehampton, London
- 2014: 'Dance of Disapproval' Anna Pavlova House, London
- 2015: 'Mother Mould', Gazelli Art House, Mayfair, London
- 2015–16: Wooyang Art Museum, Gyeongju-si, South Korea Retrospective
- 2017: TIMH, NY Psychoanalytic Association – small works display
- 2017: 'Object Authority' Pasmore Gallery, Harrow School, London
- 2017: 'Recent works', C2 Contemporary – Di Pinto, Florence, Italy
- 2017: Societe Psychanalytique de Paris, Lyon, France, exhibition and presentation
- 2017: Symposium and Exhibition with works by Claudio Costa, Silesiun Uni. of Mestre, Vencice, Italy
- 2017: Museum of Modern Art, Ascona, Lugano, Switzerland – Group exhibition
- 2017–18: 'Object' Fix Me in Your Turquoise Gaze', Gazelli Art House, London
- 2017–18: 'Freud Study Merge', CE Contemporary, Milan, Italy
- 2018: Jekza Gallery, Timișoara, Romania
- 2018: Oradea City Museum, Oradea, Romania
- 2019: Palazzo Tagliaferro, Andora, Italy
- 2019: Palazzo Ducale, Genoa, Italy
- 2019: Museo Attivoa Claudia Costa, Quarto, Genoa, Italy
- 2019: Spatui Intact, Cluj, Romania
- 2020: Headstone Manor Museum, Harrow, London
- 2020: Gazelli Art House, Baku, Azerbaijan
- 2021–22: Installation, Freud Birth House, Pribor, CZ

== See also ==
- Freud family
