= Industrial plasticine =

Modeling material which is mainly used by automotive design studios

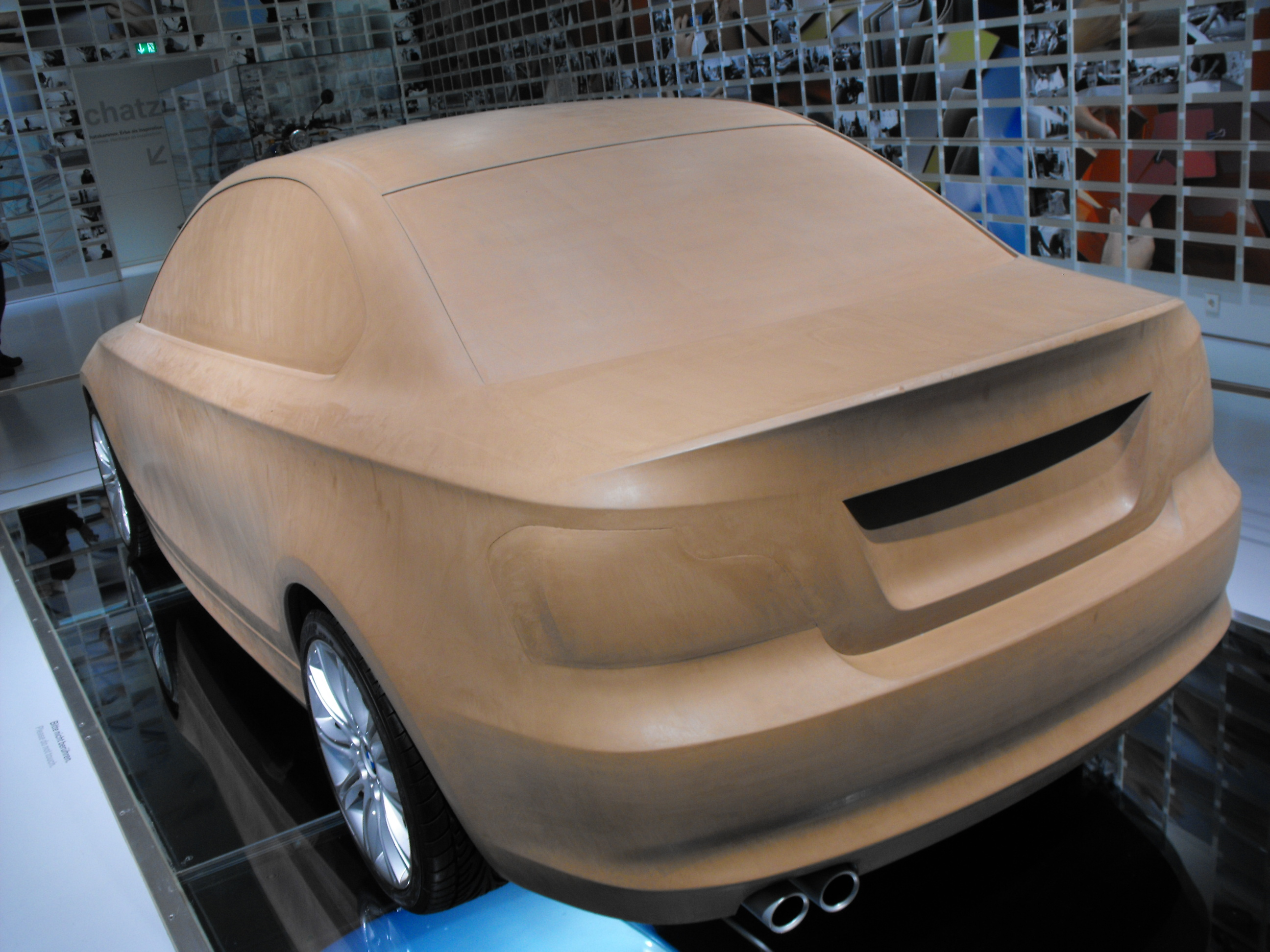
A clay model of a BMW 1 Series

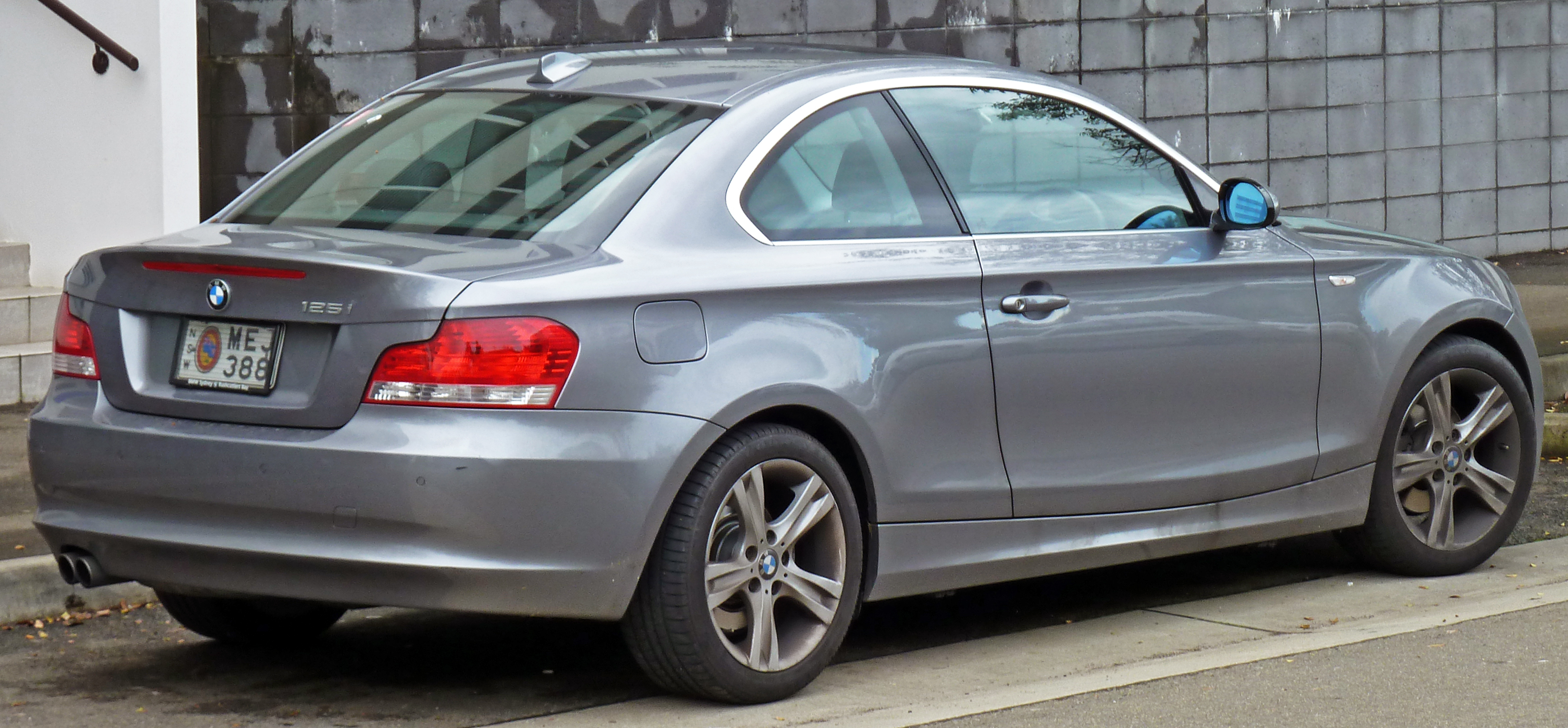
The end result: BMW 125i

Industrial plasticine is a modeling material which is mainly used by automotive design studios. It was developed as an industrial version of Plasticine or hobby clay.

Industrial plasticine is based on wax and typically contains sulfur, which gives a characteristic smell to most artificial clays. The styled object can be used to create moulds. However, largely because sulfur interfered with some mould-making processes, especially if clay surfaces are unsealed and platinum-cure room-temperature–vulcanizing silicone was used, sulfur-free variants are now available; these are usually much lighter than sulfur-containing clays.

If a negative mold is required, this data is sent to a milling machine.

== Design studios ==
Before a new car model is launched, a long period of creating the right design takes place. Even today, computer models are not sufficient to evaluate a design. Therefore 1:4 and then 1:1 models are built to get an impression of the final car. These models are created in clay, and usually consist of a wooden or iron frame which is covered with Styrofoam. Clay is smoothed over the foam. Modellers then use various tools and slicks to finalize the shape of the car, since changes are readily possible.

More recently, clay models are 3D scanned into a digital file using laser technology. This is then opened in computer-aided design software to be worked further.

== Suppliers ==
There are three main producers of industrial plasticine operating worldwide:

- Staedtler, of Germany, which is also known for FIMO.
- BOMI in Shanghai, known for its production of industrial clays.
- Chavant, which was founded by the French chemist Claude Chavant and is now in New Jersey, US.
