= Goldstone (glass) =

Type of glass

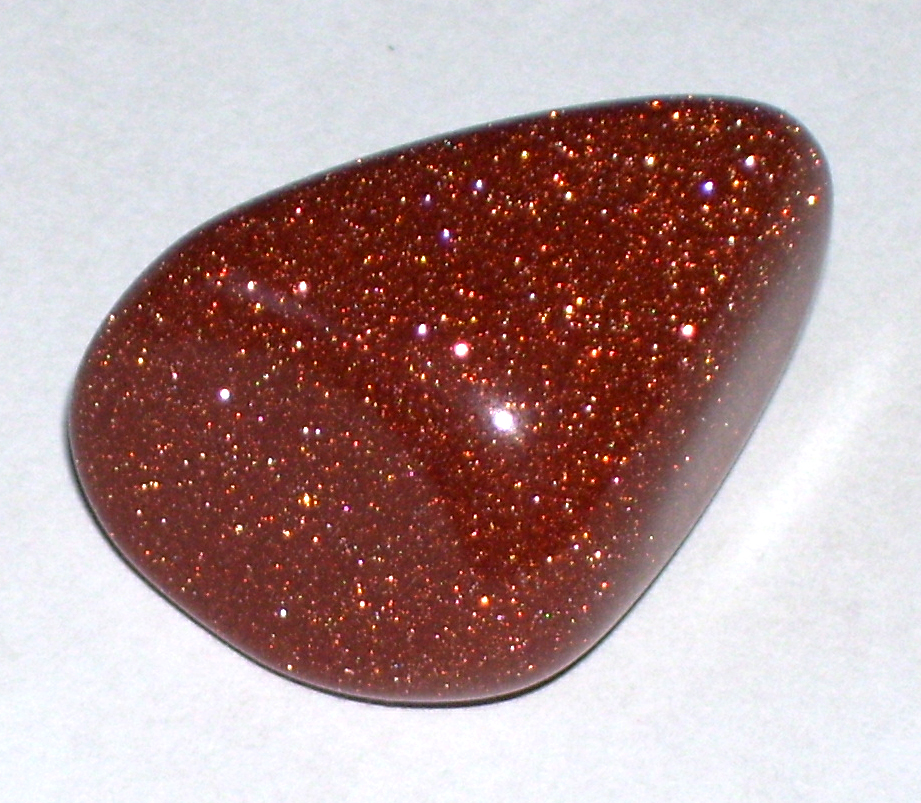
Goldstone

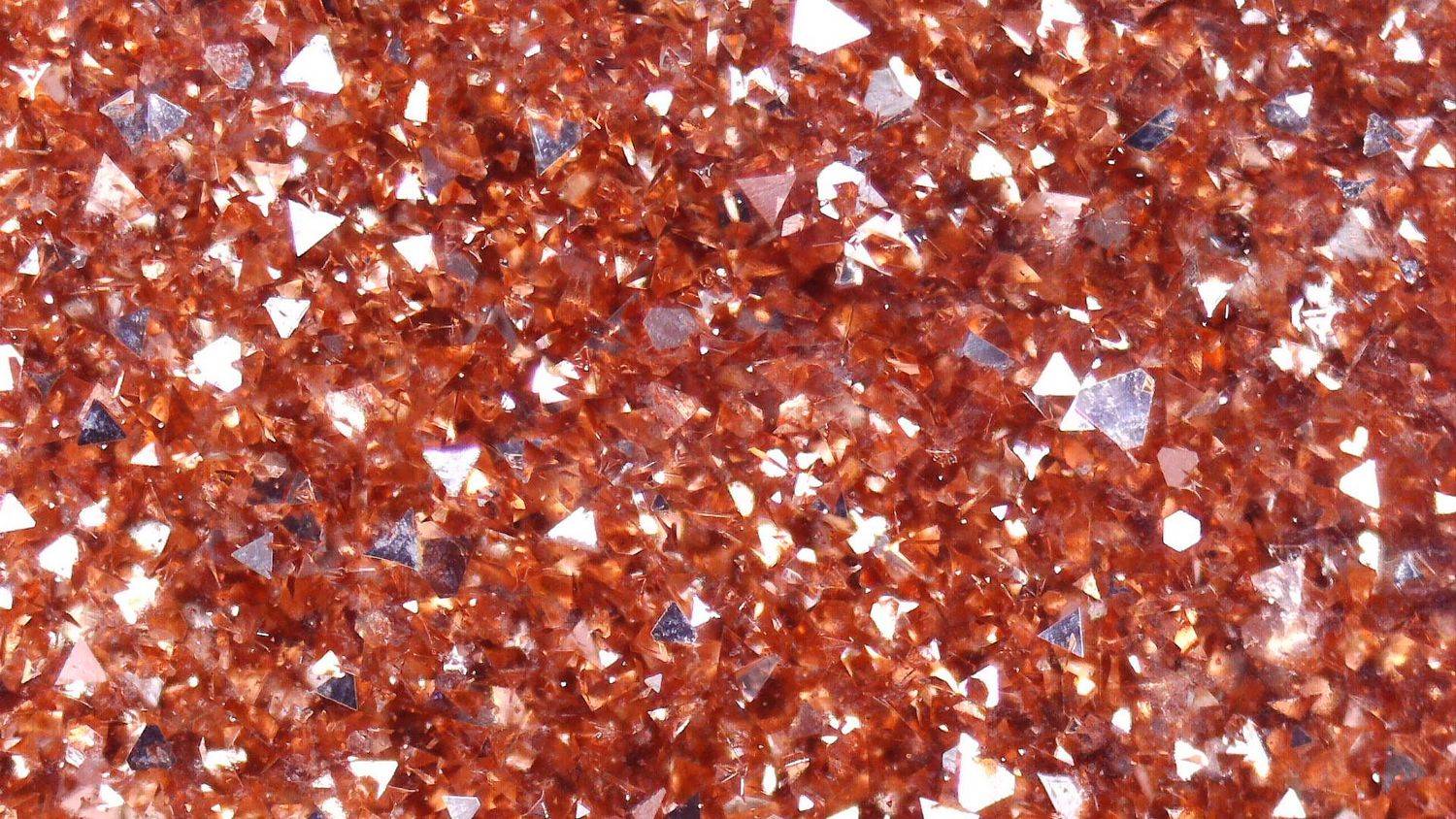
Goldstone glass under magnification

Goldstone is a type of glittering glass made in a low-oxygen reducing atmosphere. The finished product can take a smooth polish and be carved into beads, figurines, or other artifacts suitable for semiprecious stone. Goldstone is often mistaken for or misrepresented as a natural material.

== Nomenclature ==
Another common name for the material is aventurine glass, based on the original Italian name avventurina (from avventura, "adventure" or "chance"). It is called "del-roba" (Persian: دلربا) in Persian which means "Charming"; or "monk's gold" or "monkstone" from folkloric associations with an unnamed monastic order.

The material is sometimes incorrectly called sandstone when used in watch dials, and other jewelry, despite its lack of resemblance to the porous, matte texture of the natural stone. It's also confused with sunstone but apart from the aventurine-like look and the colour, they don't share anything in their structure.

Additionally, "aventurine" glass is one of the few synthetic simulants to provide the eponym for the similar natural stones. The mineral name "aventurine" is used for forms of feldspar or quartz with mica inclusions that give a similar glittering appearance; the technical term for this optical phenomenon, "aventurescence", is also derived from the same source.

== Production ==
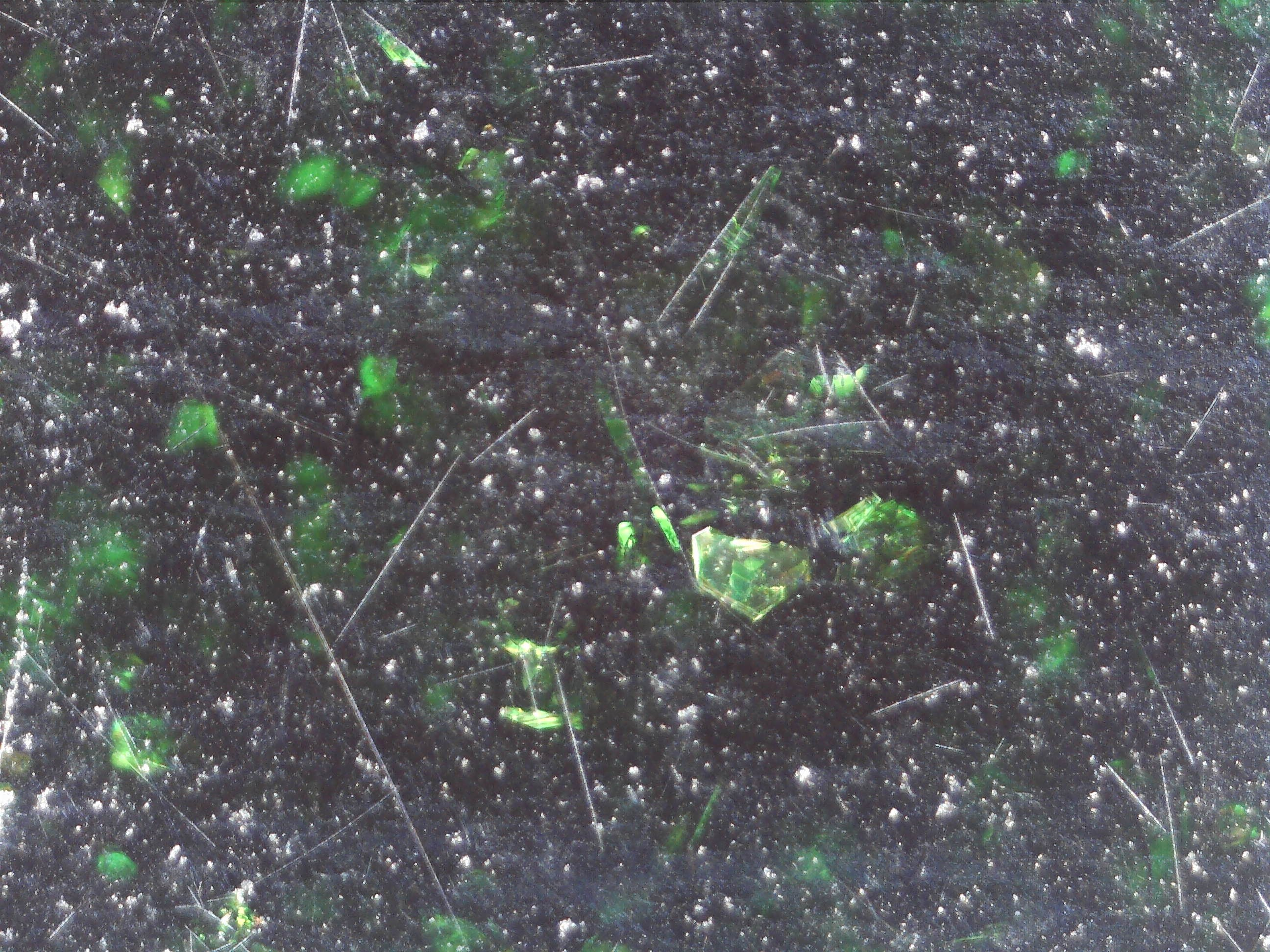
The chromium containing goldstone glass, under magnification

One original manufacturing process for goldstone was invented in seventeenth-century Venice by the Miotti family, which was granted an exclusive license by the Doge. Urban legend says goldstone was an accidental discovery by unspecified Italian monks or the product of alchemy, but there is no pre-Miotti documentation to confirm this. A goldstone amulet from 12th- to 13th-century Persia in the collection of the University of Pennsylvania shows that other, earlier artisans were also able to create the material.

The most common form of goldstone is reddish-brown, containing tiny crystals of metallic copper that require special conditions to form properly. The initial batch is melted together from silica, copper oxide, and other metal oxides to chemically reduce the copper ions to elemental copper. The vat is then sealed off from the air and maintained within a narrow temperature range, keeping the glass hot enough to remain liquid while allowing metallic crystals to precipitate from solution without melting or oxidizing.

After a suitable crystallization period, the entire batch is cooled to a single solid mass, which is then broken out of the vat for selection and shaping. The final appearance of each batch is highly variable and heterogeneous. The best material is near the center or "heart" of the mass, ideally with large, bright metal crystals suspended in a semitransparent glass matrix.

== Variations ==
=== Copper colloid size and failure modes ===
Copper-based "red goldstone" aventurine glass exists on a structural continuum with transparent red copper ruby glass and opaque "sealing wax" purpurin glass, all of which are striking glasses, the reddish colors of which are created by colloidal copper. The key variable is controlling the colloid size: goldstone has macroscopic reflective crystals; purpurin glass has microscopic opaque particles; copper ruby glass has submicroscopic transparent nanoparticles.

The outer layers of a goldstone batch tend to have duller colors and a lower degree of glittery aventurescence. This can be caused by poor crystallization, which simultaneously decreases the size of reflective crystals and opacifies the surrounding glass with non reflective particles. It can also be caused by partial oxidation of the copper, causing it to redissolve and form its usual transparent blue-green glass in ionic solution.

When reheated for lamp-working and similar uses, the working conditions should control the temperature and oxidation as required for the original batch melt: keep the temperature below the melting point of copper (1084.62 °C) and use an oxygen-poor reducing flame, or risk decomposition into the failure modes described above.

=== Non-copper goldstones ===
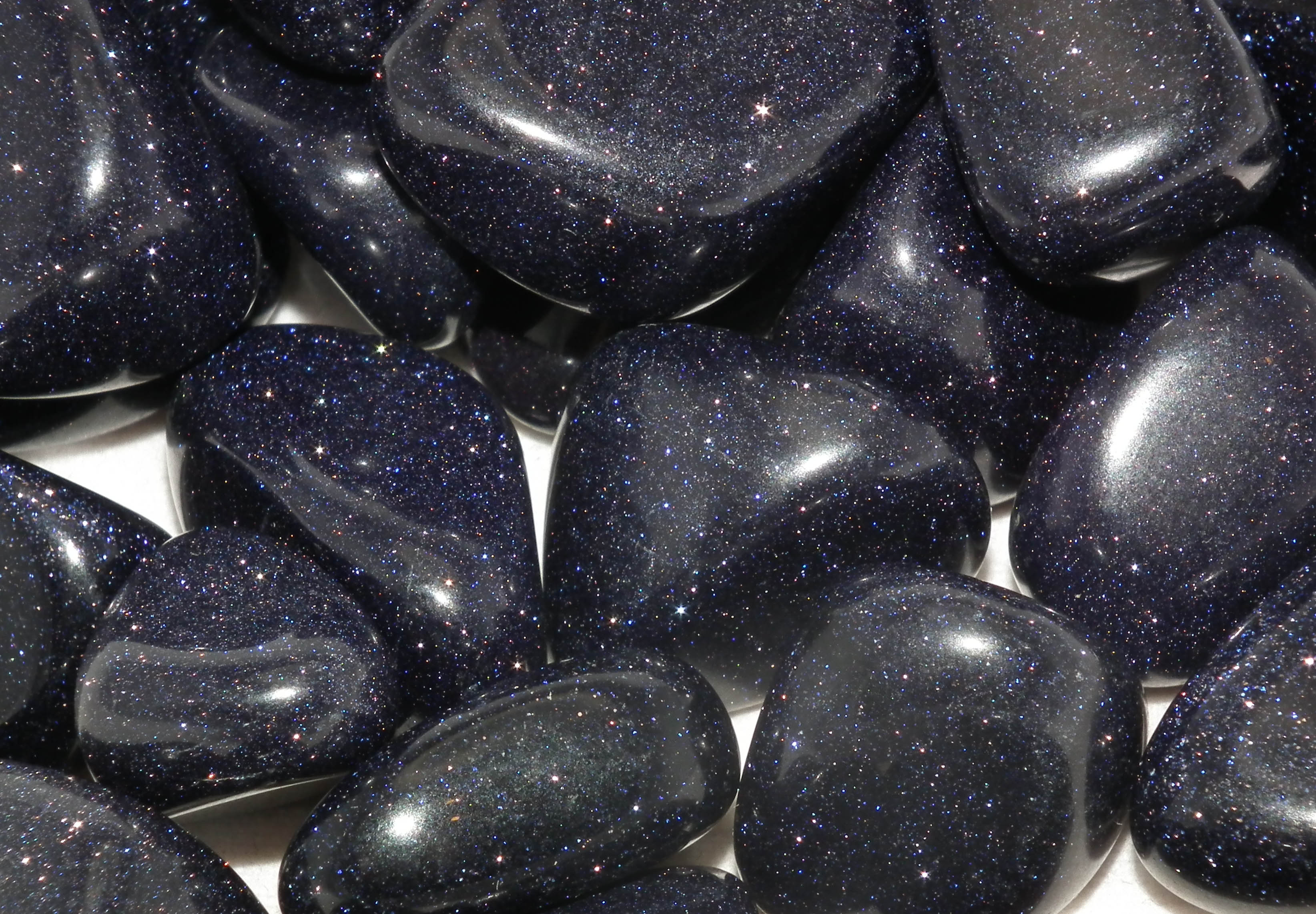
Tumble polished blue Goldstone pieces.

Goldstone also exists in other color variants based on other elements. Cobalt or manganese can be substituted for copper; the resulting crystals have a more silvery appearance and are suspended in a strongly colored matrix of the corresponding ionic color, resulting in blue goldstone or purple goldstone respectively.

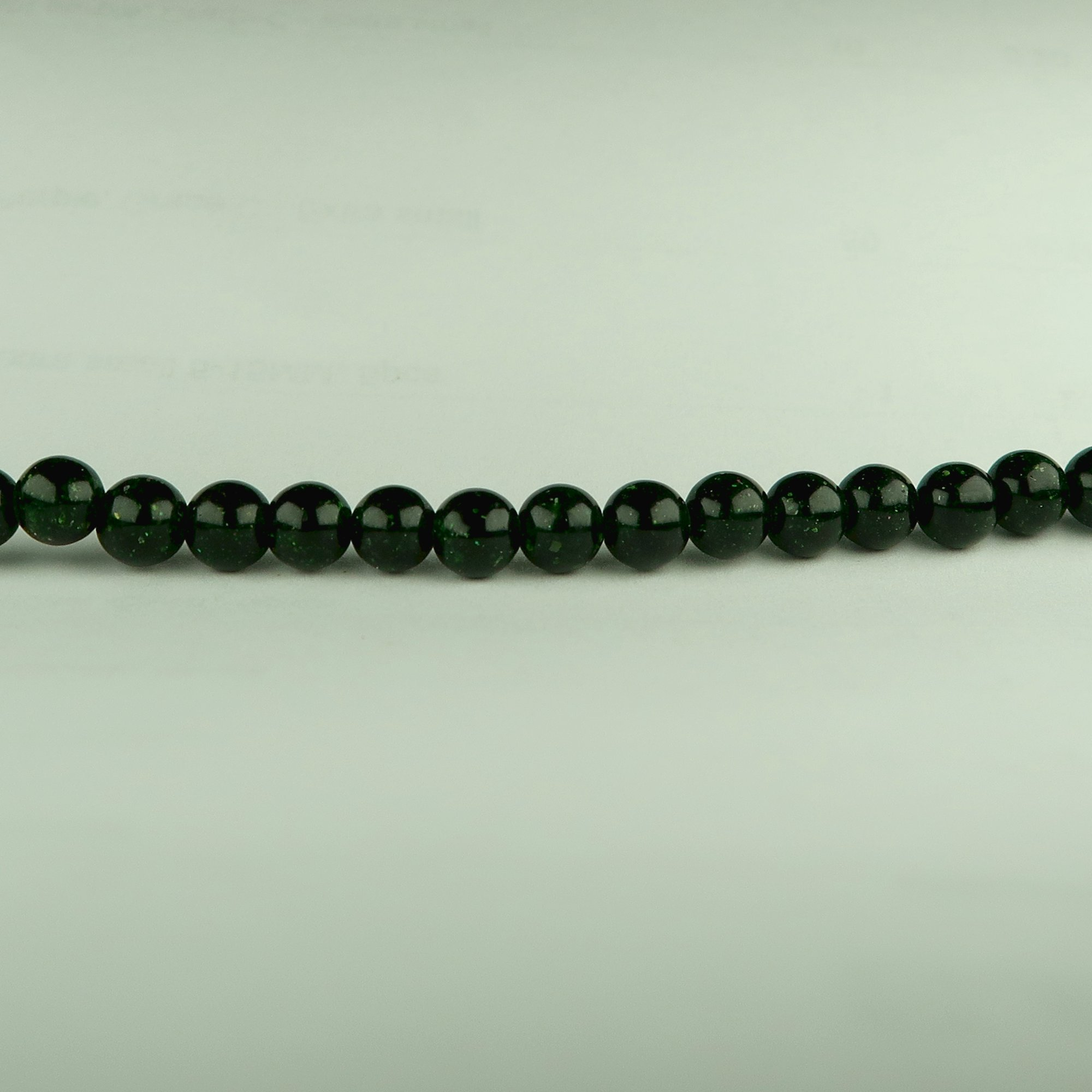
A strand of green (chromium rich) goldstone glass beads

Green goldstone, or chrome aventurine, forms its reflective particles from chromium oxides rather than the elemental metal, but is otherwise fairly similar.

The non-copper goldstones are easier to work with when reheated, due to the less stringent reduction requirements and higher melting points of manganese (1246 °C) and cobalt (1495 °C). However, the chromium coloured 'green' goldstone glass seems to be significantly less commonly used.

== See also ==
- Helenite
