= Glass coloring and color marking =

Production methods of colored glass

The appearance of different colors in glass is largely due to the way light interacts with the materials it contains. In an extremely pure glass, without impurities such as bubbles, coloring ions, or crystalline and nano-sized phases, all visible light would pass through, and the glass would appear completely transparent. When such impurities are present, they selectively absorb certain wavelengths of light, resulting in coloured glass.

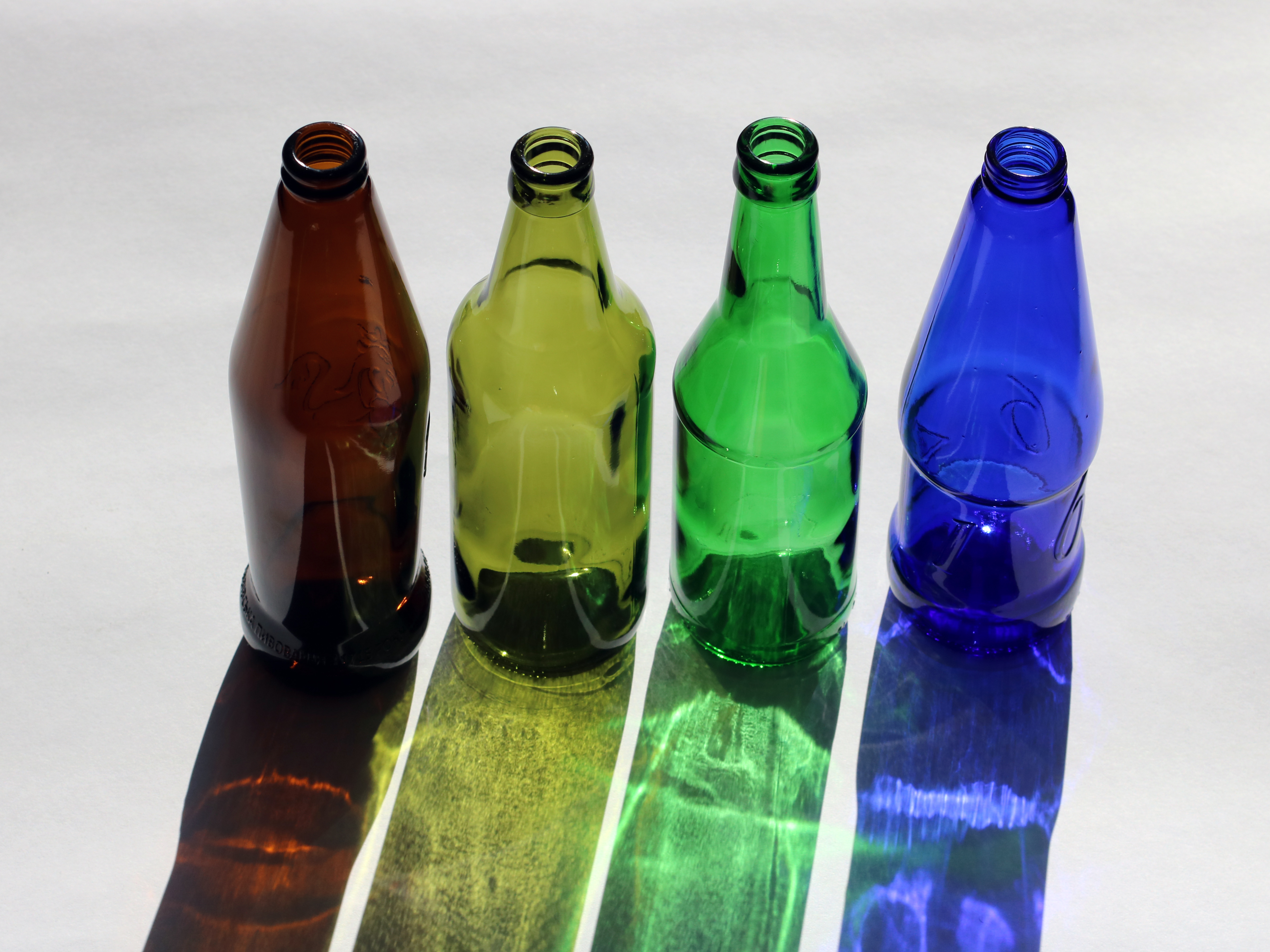
Beer bottles of different colors

Glass coloring and color marking may be obtained in several ways.

1. by the addition of coloring ions,
2. by precipitation of nanometer-sized colloids (so-called striking glasses such as "gold ruby" or red "selenium ruby"),
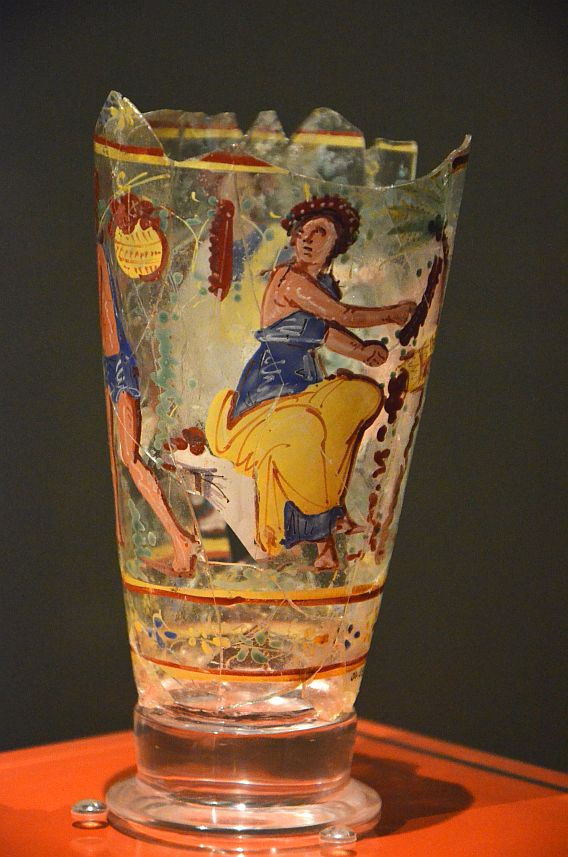
  Ancient Roman enamelled glass, 1st century, Treasure of Begram
3. by colored inclusions (as in milk glass and smoked glass)
4. by light scattering (as in phase separated glass)
5. by dichroic coatings (see dichroic glass), or
6. by colored coatings

== Coloring ions ==
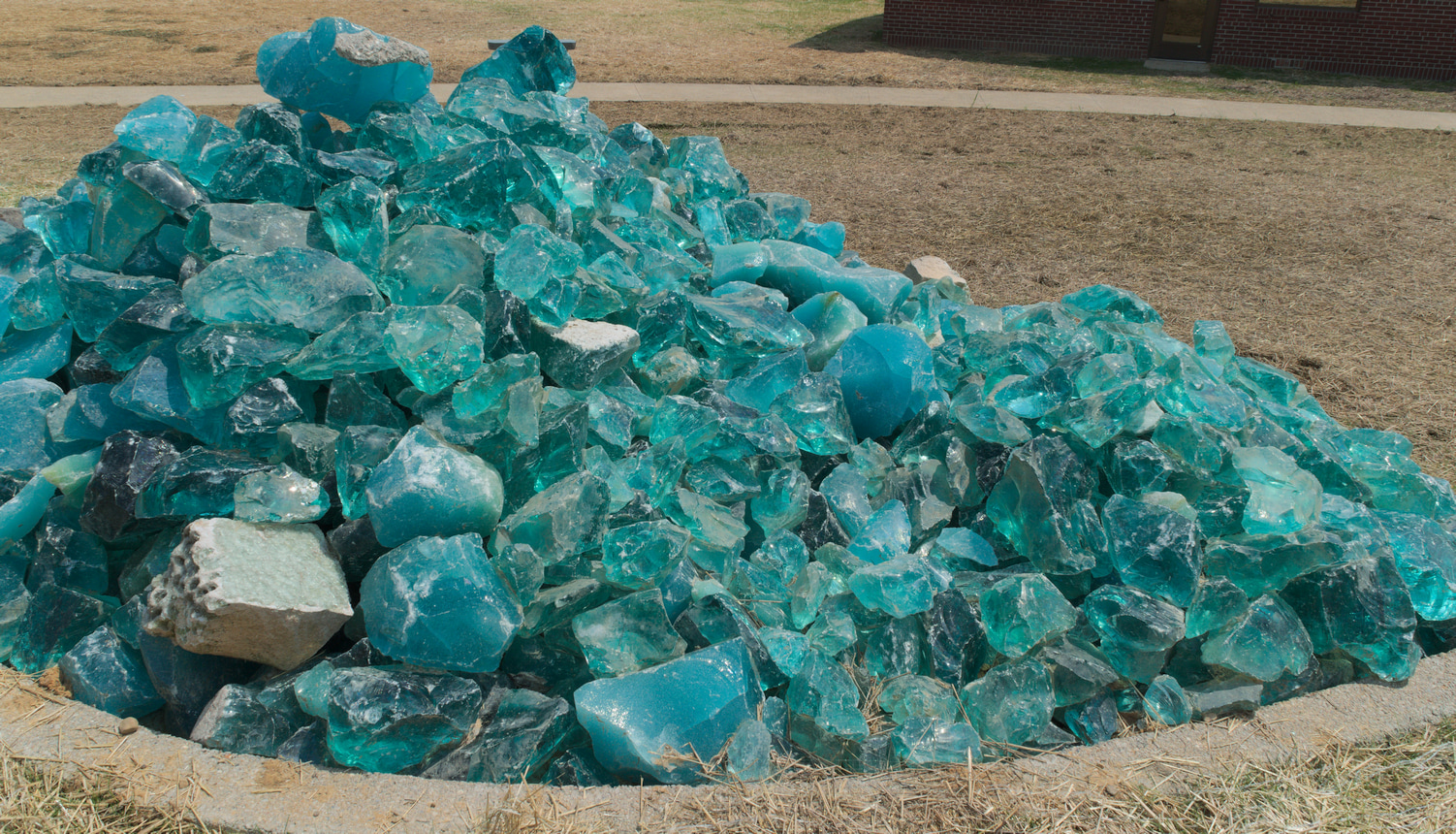
Iron(II) oxide glass

Ordinary soda-lime glass appears colorless to the naked eye when it is thin, although iron oxide impurities produce a green tint which can be viewed in thick pieces or with the aid of scientific instruments. Further metals and metal oxides can be added to glass during its manufacture to change its color which can enhance its aesthetic appeal. Examples of these additives are listed below:

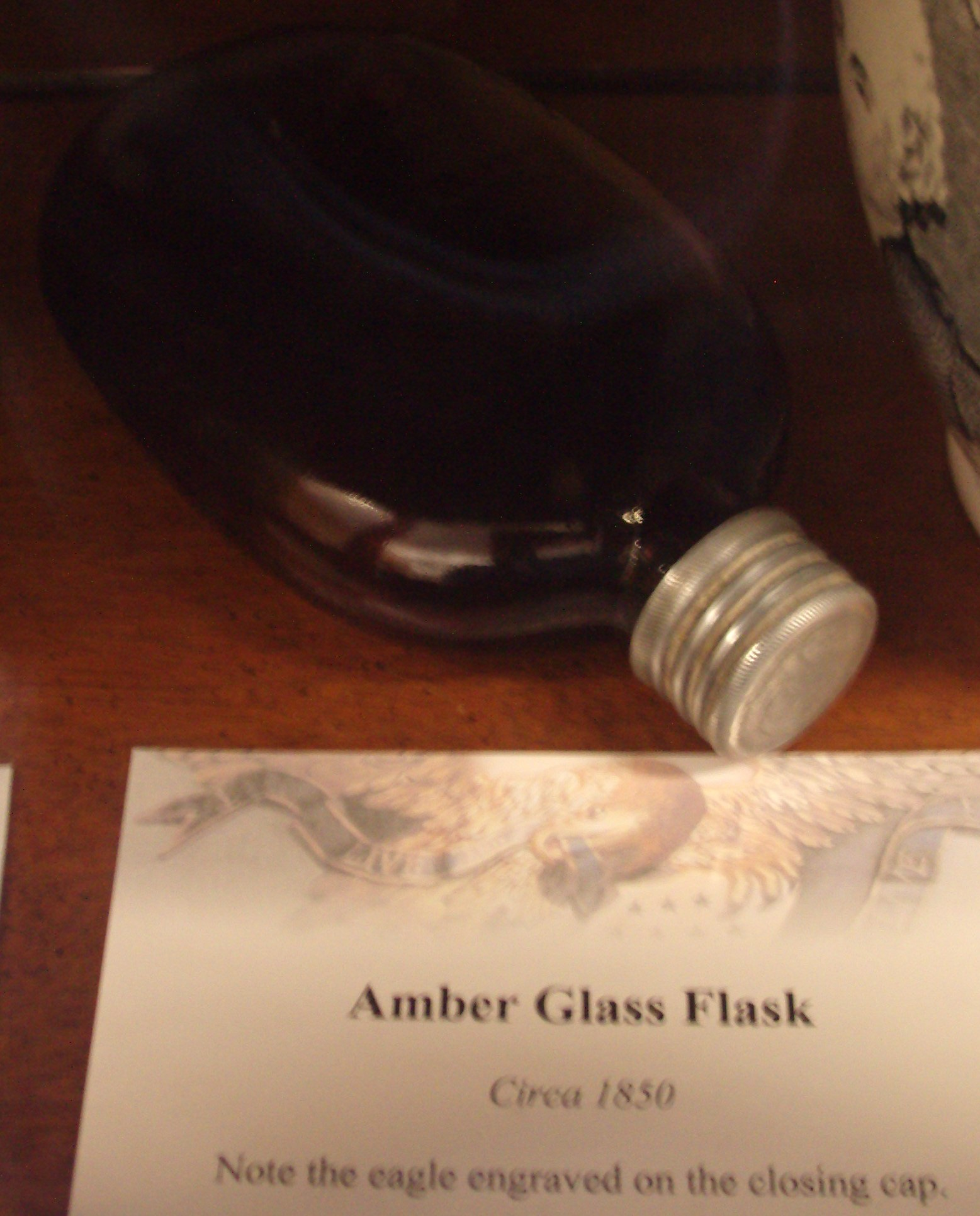
Amber Glass

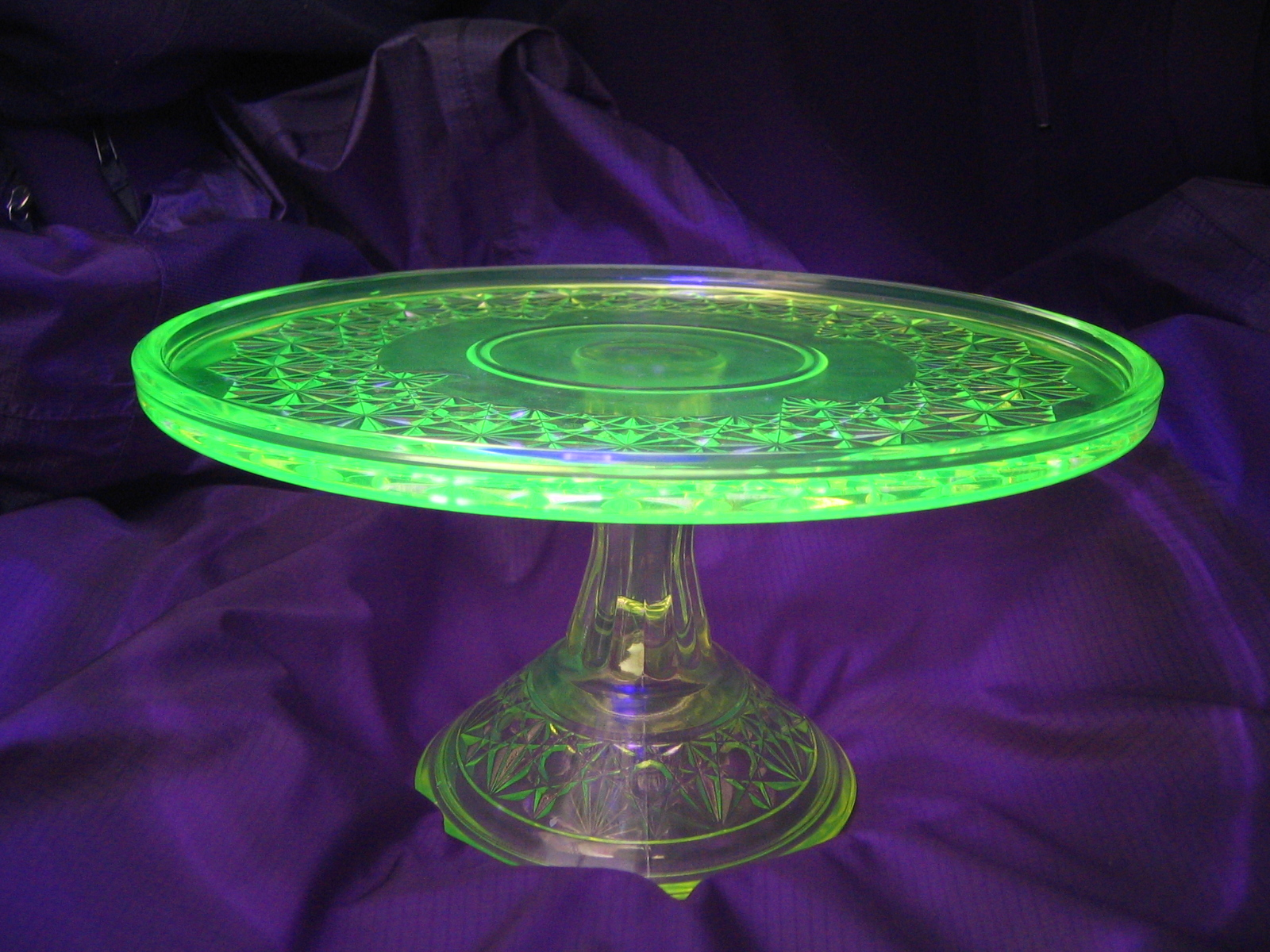
Uranium glass glowing under ultraviolet radiation

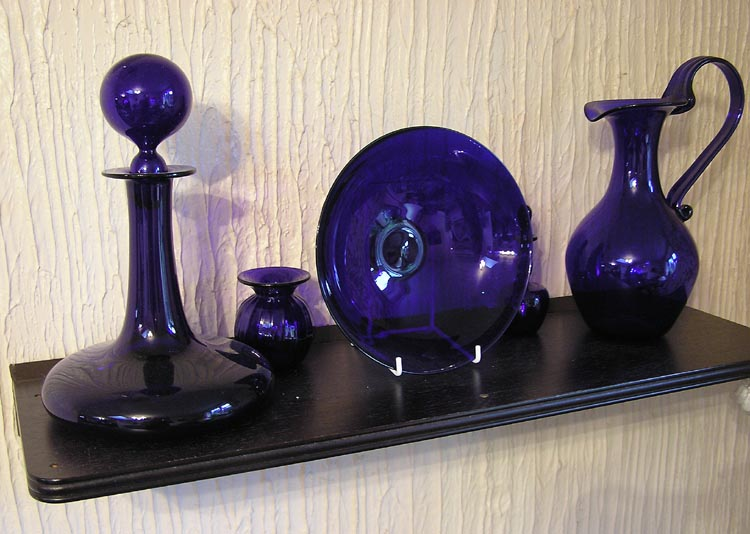
Cobalt glass for decoration

- Iron(II) oxide may be added to glass resulting in bluish-green glass which is frequently used in beer bottles. Together with chromium it gives a richer green color, used for wine bottles.
- Sulfur, together with carbon and iron salts, is used to form iron polysulfides and produce amber glass ranging from yellowish to almost black. In borosilicate glasses rich in boron, sulfur imparts a blue color. With calcium it yields a deep yellow color.
- Manganese can be added in small amounts to remove the green tint given by iron, or in higher concentrations to give glass an amethyst color. Manganese is one of the oldest glass additives, and purple manganese glass was used since early Egyptian history.
- Manganese dioxide, which is black, is used to remove the green color from the glass; in a very slow process this is converted to sodium permanganate, a dark purple compound. In New England some houses built more than 300 years ago have window glass which is lightly tinted violet because of this chemical change, and such glass panes are prized as antiques. This process is widely confused with the formation of "desert amethyst glass", in which glass exposed to desert sunshine with a high ultraviolet component develops a delicate violet tint. Details of the process and the composition of the glass vary and so do the results, because it is not a simple matter to obtain or produce properly controlled specimens.
- Small concentrations of cobalt (0.025 to 0.1%) yield blue glass. The best results are achieved when using glass containing potash. Very small amounts can be used for decolorizing.
- 2 to 3% of copper oxide produces a turquoise color.
- Nickel, depending on the concentration, produces blue, or violet, or even black glass. Lead crystal with added nickel acquires purplish color. Nickel together with a small amount of cobalt was used for decolorizing of lead glass.
- Chromium is a very powerful colorizing agent, yielding dark green or in higher concentrations even black color. Together with tin oxide and arsenic it yields emerald green glass. Chromium aventurine, in which aventurescence is achieved by growth of large parallel chromium(III) oxide plates during cooling, is made from glass with added chromium oxide in amount above its solubility limit in glass.
- Cadmium together with sulfur forms cadmium sulfide and results in deep yellow color, often used in glazes. However, cadmium is toxic. Together with selenium and sulfur it yields shades of bright red and orange.
- Adding titanium produces yellowish-brown glass. Titanium, rarely used on its own, is more often employed to intensify and brighten other colorizing additives.
- Uranium (0.1 to 2%) can be added to give glass a fluorescent yellow or green color. Uranium glass is typically not radioactive enough to be dangerous, but if ground into a powder, such as by polishing with sandpaper, and inhaled, it can be carcinogenic. When used with lead glass with very high proportion of lead, produces a deep red color.
- Didymium gives green color (used in UV filters) or lilac red.

== Striking glasses ==
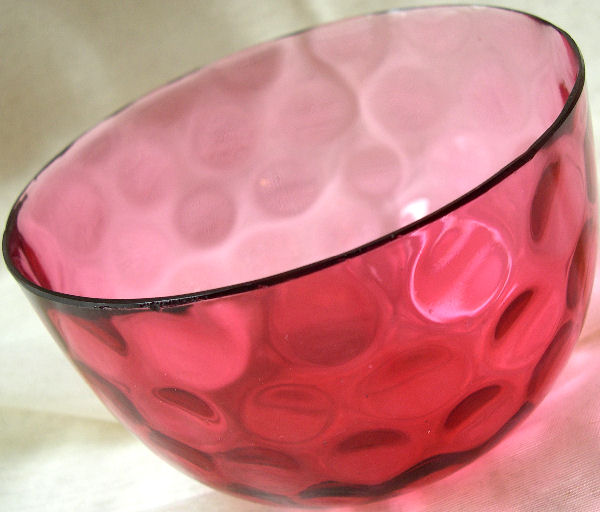
Cranberry glass bowl

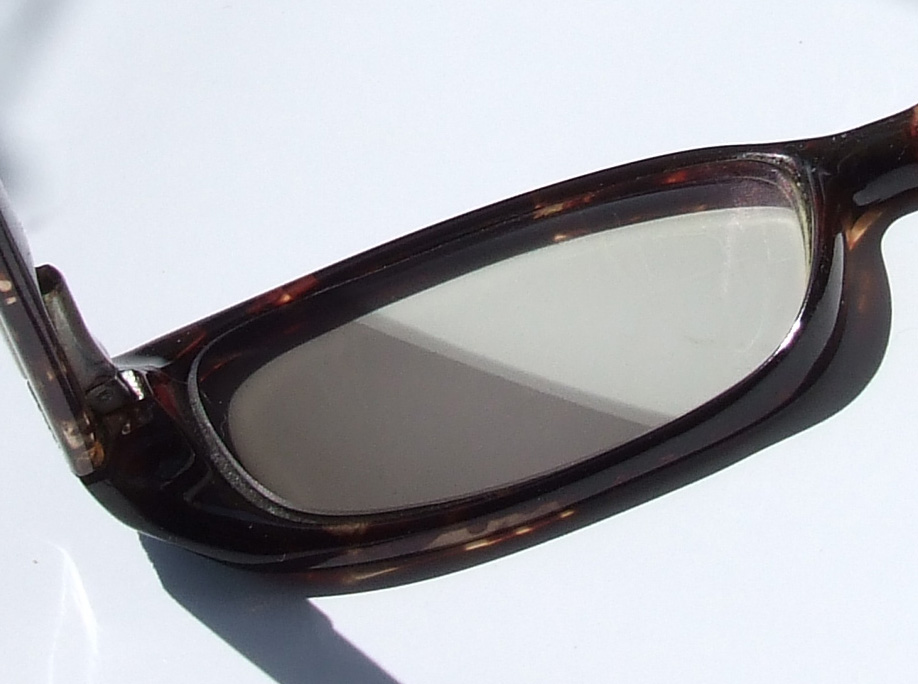
Photochromic eyeglass lens. The coloring is caused by silver nanoparticles.

- Selenium, like manganese, can be used in small concentrations to decolorize glass, or in higher concentrations to impart a reddish color, caused by selenium nanoparticles dispersed in glass. It is a very important agent to make pink and red glass. When used together with cadmium sulfide, it yields a brilliant red color known as "Selenium Ruby".
- Pure metallic copper produces a very dark red, opaque glass, which is sometimes used as a substitute for gold in the production of ruby-colored glass.
- Metallic gold, in very small concentrations (around 0.001%, or 10 ppm), produces a rich ruby-colored glass ("Ruby Gold" or "Rubino Oro"), while lower concentrations produces a less intense red, often marketed as "cranberry". The color is caused by the size and dispersion of gold particles. Ruby gold glass is usually made of lead glass with added tin.
- Silver compounds such as silver nitrate and silver halides can produce a range of colors from orange-red to yellow. The way the glass is heated and cooled can significantly affect the colors produced by these compounds. Also photochromic lenses and photosensitive glass are based on silver.
- Purple of Cassius is a purple pigment formed by the reaction of gold salts with tin(II) chloride.

== Coloring added to glass ==
The principal methods of this are enamelled glass, essentially a technique for painting patterns or images, used for both glass vessels and on stained glass, and glass paint, typically in black, and silver stain, giving yellows to oranges on stained glass. All of these are fired in a kiln or furnace to fix them, and can be extremely durable when properly applied. This is not true of "cold-painted" glass, using oil paint or other mixtures, which rarely last more than a few centuries.

== Colored inclusions ==
Tin oxide with antimony and arsenic oxides produce an opaque white glass (milk glass), first used in Venice to produce an imitation porcelain, very often then painted with enamels. Similarly, some smoked glasses may be based on dark-colored inclusions, but with ionic coloring it is also possible to produce dark colors (see above).

== Color caused by scattering ==
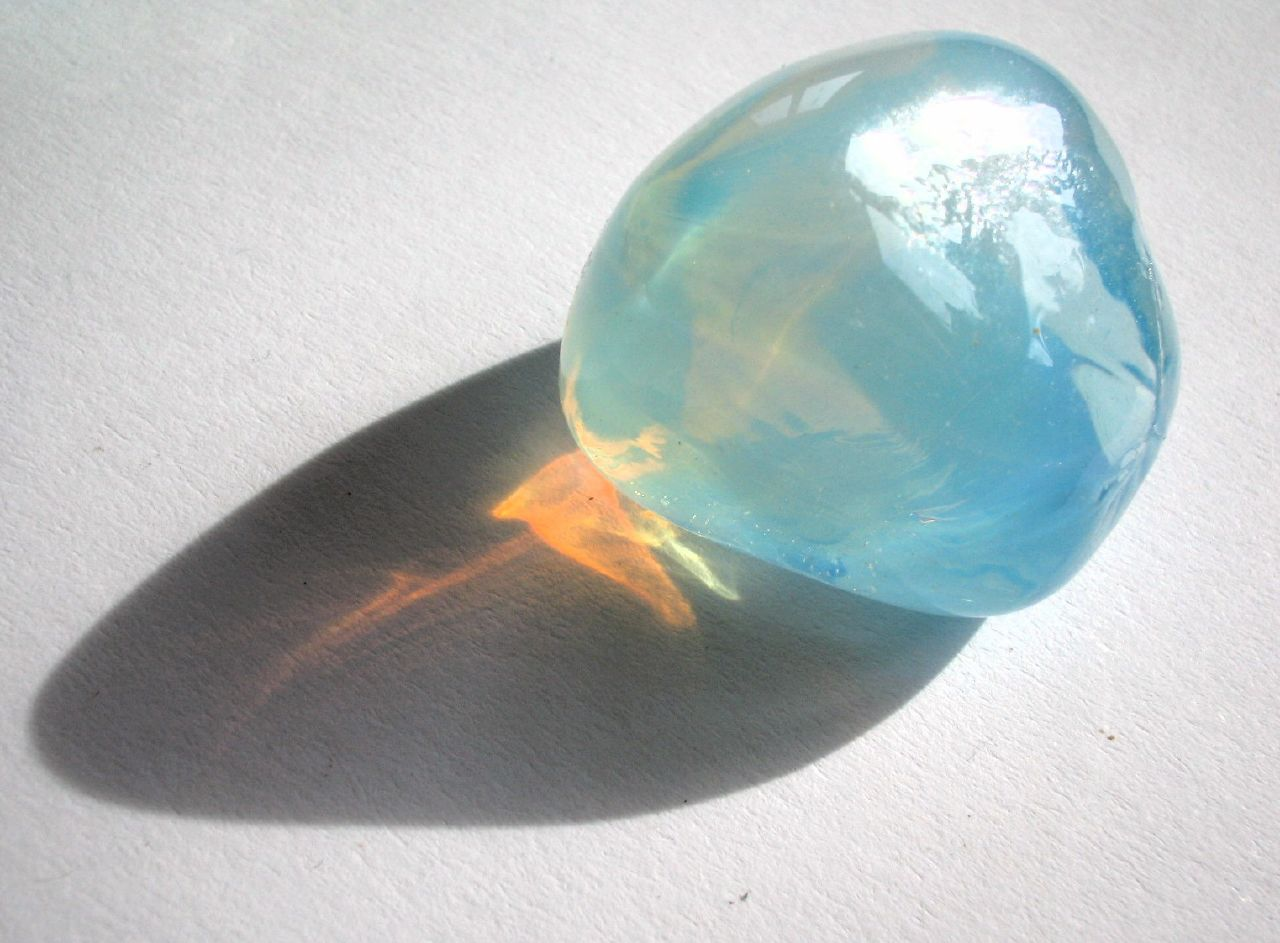
The Tyndall effect in opalescent glass: it appears blue from the side, but orange light shines through.

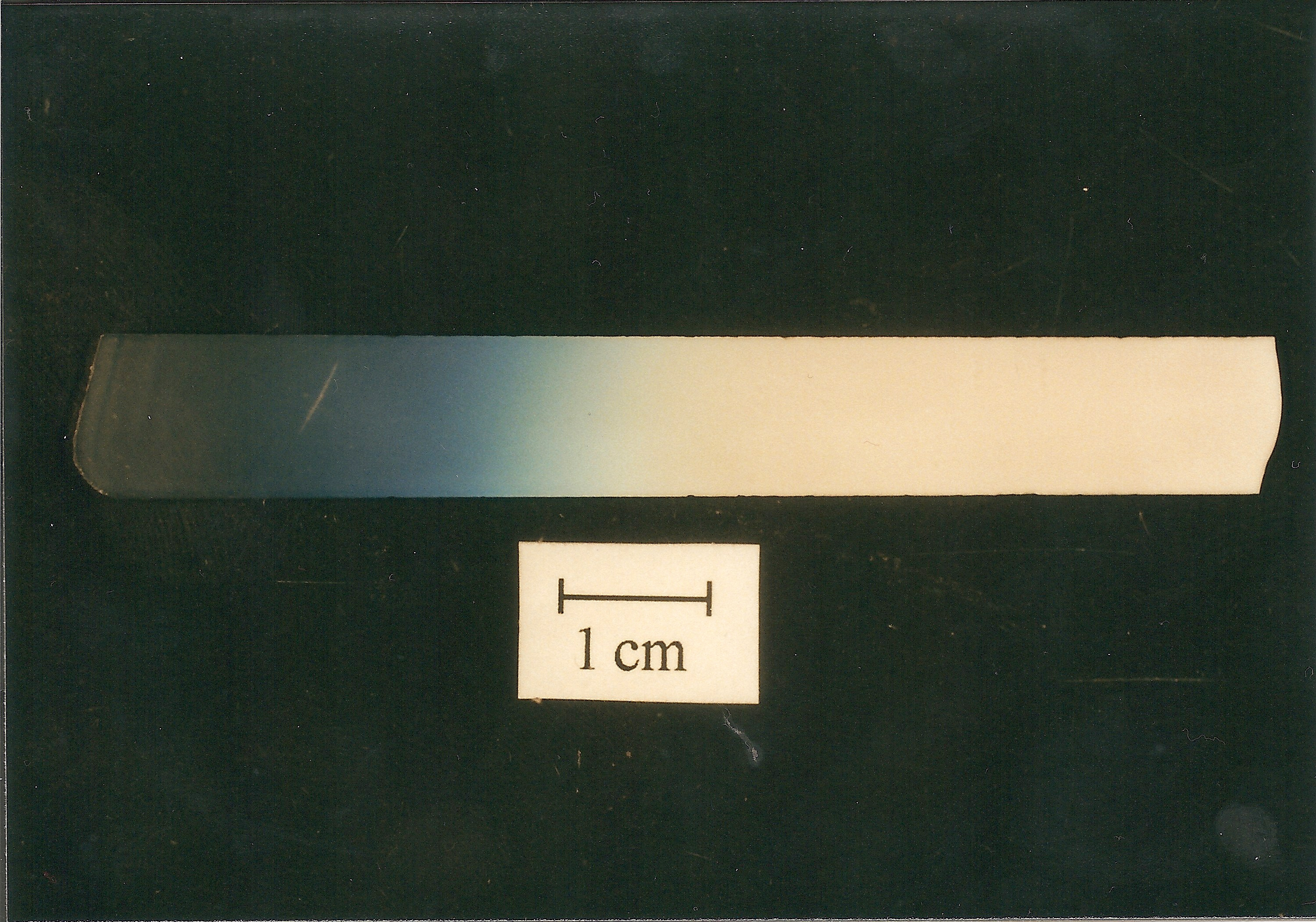
Porous glass pore-size gradient (large pores on the right); coloring based on the Tyndall effect.

Glass containing two or more phases with different refractive indices shows coloring based on the Tyndall effect and explained by the Mie theory, if the dimensions of the phases are similar or larger than the wavelength of visible light. The scattered light is blue and violet as seen in the image, while the transmitted light is yellow and red.

== Dichroic glass ==
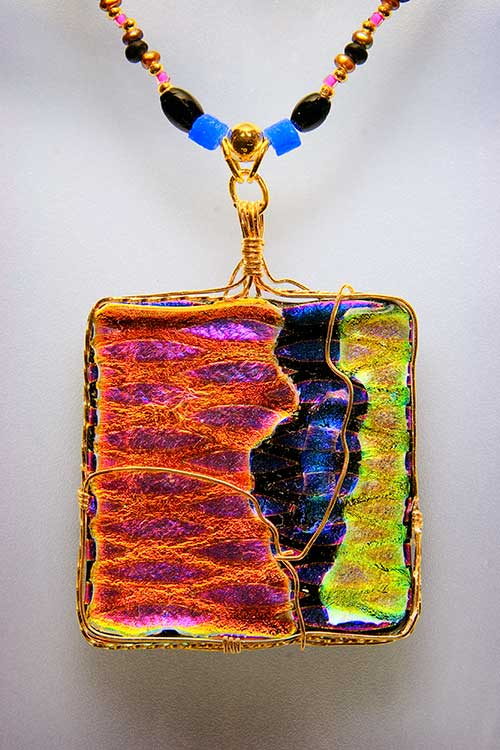
A pendant made from dichroic glass

Dichroic glass has one or several coatings in the nanometer-range (for example metals, metal oxides, or nitrides) which give the glass dichroic optical properties. Also the blue appearance of some automobile windshields is caused by dichroism.

== See also ==
- Crystal field theory - physical explanation coloring
- Color of medieval stained glass
- Hydrogen darkening
- Hydroxyl ion absorption
- Transparent materials
