= Andesine =

Plagioclase feldspar with 50–70% albite

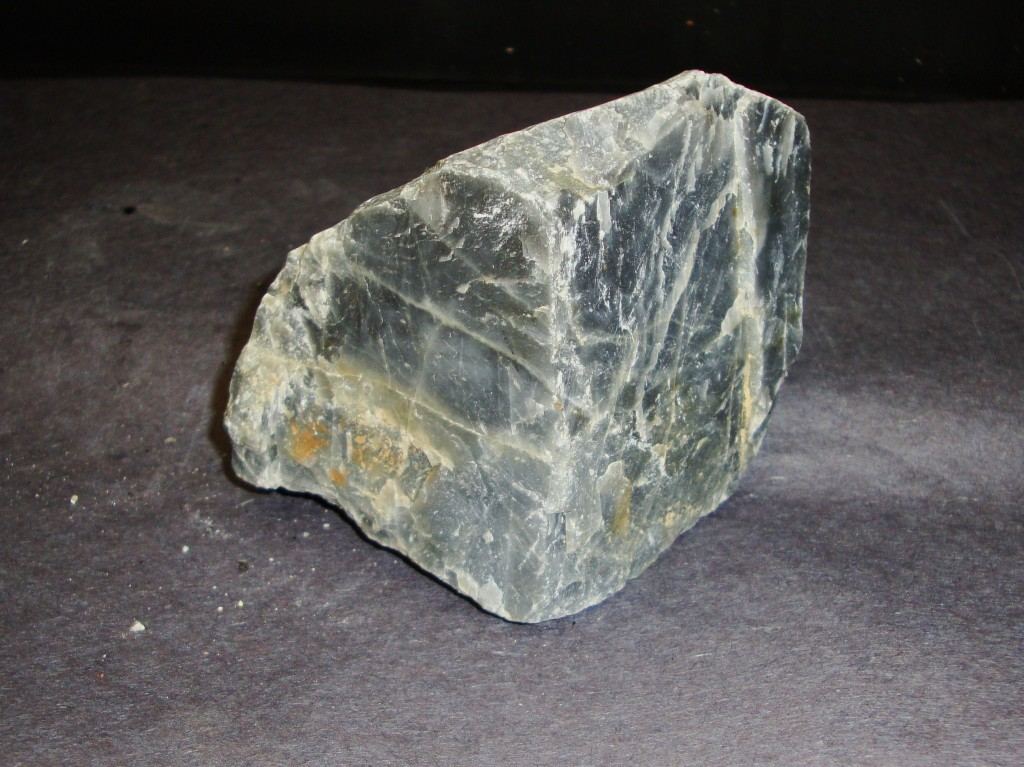
- Andesine

General
- Category: Tectosilicate minerals
- Group: Feldspar group
- Series: Plagioclase feldspar series
- Formula: (Ca,Na)(Al,Si)_{4}O_{8} (Na:Ca = 50:50 to 70:30)
- IMA status: Variety of albite
- Crystal system: Triclinic
- Crystal class: Pinacoidal (1̅)
- Space group: P1̅ (no. 2)
- Unit cell: a = 8.155 Å, b = 12.9 Å, c = 9.16 Å; α = 93.917°, β = 116.3333°, γ = 89.166°; Z = 8

Identification
- Color: White, gray, green, yellow, flesh-red
- Crystal habit: Crystals rare, to 2 cm; commonly massive or granular
- Twinning: Common following albite, pericline, and carlsbad twin laws
- Cleavage: Perfect on {001}, good on {010}
- Fracture: Uneven to conchoidal
- Tenacity: Brittle
- Mohs scale hardness: 6 – 6.5
- Luster: Subvitreous to pearly
- Streak: White
- Diaphaneity: Transparent to translucent
- Specific gravity: 2.66 – 2.68
- Optical properties: Biaxial (+/−)
- Refractive index: n_{α} = 1.543 – 1.554 n_{β} = 1.547 – 1.559 n_{γ} = 1.552 – 1.562
- Birefringence: δ = 0.009
- 2V angle: Measured: 76° to 83°
- Diagnostic features: Requires optical/chemical analysis

Andesine is a silicate mineral, a member of the plagioclase feldspar solid solution series. Its chemical formula is (Ca, Na)(Al, Si)_{4}O_{8}, where the ratio of albite to anorthite (Na:Ca) is 50:50 to 70:30. The formula may be written as Na_{0.5–0.7}Ca_{0.3–0.5}Al_{1.3–1.5}Si_{2.5–2.7}O_{8}.

The plagioclase feldspars are a continuous solid solution series and as such the accurate identification of individual members requires detailed optical study, chemical analysis or density measurements. Refractive indices and specific gravity increase directly with calcium content.

It is sometimes used as a gemstone.

== Name and discovery ==
Andesine was first described in 1841 for an occurrence in the Marmato mine, Marmato, Cauca, Chocó Department, Colombia. The name is for the Andes due to its abundance in the andesite lavas in those mountains.

In the early 2000s, red and green gemstones began to be marketed under the name of 'andesine'. After some controversy, these gemstones were subsequently discovered to have been artificially-colored.

== Occurrence ==
Andesine occurs in intermediate igneous rocks such as diorite, syenite, and andesite. It characteristically occurs in metamorphic rocks of granulite to amphibolite facies commonly exhibiting antiperthite texture. It also occurs as detrital grains in sedimentary rocks. It is commonly associated with quartz, potassium feldspar, biotite, hornblende, and magnetite.

== Andesine controversy ==
In the early 2000s, a new variety of red or green gemstone resembling sunstone and called "andesine" appeared in the gem market. After much controversy and debate, most of these gemstones, allegedly sourced from China, were subsequently discovered to have been artificially colored by a copper diffusion process. A Tibetan source of bona fide (untreated) red andesine, however, was eventually verified by a number of independent groups of well-respected gemologists.
