= Lustre (mineralogy) =

Manner in which light interacts with a crystal, rock, or mineral's surface

Lustre (Commonwealth English) or luster (American English; see spelling differences) is the way light interacts with the surface of a crystal, rock, or mineral. The word traces its origins back to the Latin lux, meaning "light", and generally implies radiance, gloss, or brilliance.

A range of terms are used to describe lustre, such as earthy, metallic, greasy, and silky. Similarly, the term vitreous (derived from the Latin for glass, vitrum) refers to a glassy lustre. A list of these terms is given below.

Lustre varies over a wide continuum, and so there are no rigid boundaries between the different types of lustre. (For this reason, different sources can often describe the same mineral differently. This ambiguity is further complicated by lustre's ability to vary widely within a particular mineral species). The terms are frequently combined to describe intermediate types of lustre (for example, a "vitreous greasy" lustre).

Some minerals exhibit unusual optical phenomena, such as asterism (the display of a star-shaped luminous area) or chatoyancy (the display of luminous bands, which appear to move as the specimen is rotated). A list of such phenomena is given below.

== Common terms ==
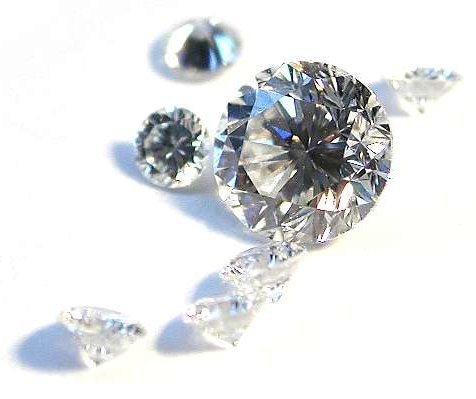
Cut diamonds

=== Adamantine lustre ===
Adamantine minerals possess a superlative lustre, which is most notably seen in diamond. Such minerals are transparent or translucent, and have a high refractive index (of 1.9 or more). Minerals with a true adamantine lustre are uncommon, with examples including cerussite, zircon, and cubic zirconia.

Minerals with a lesser (but still relatively high) degree of lustre are referred to as subadamantine, with some examples being garnet and corundum.

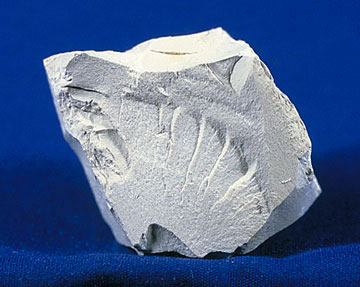
Kaolinite

=== Dull lustre ===
Dull (or earthy) minerals exhibit little to no lustre, due to coarse granulations which scatter light in all directions, approximating a Lambertian reflector. An example is kaolinite. A distinction is sometimes drawn between dull minerals and earthy minerals, with the latter being coarser, and having even less lustre.

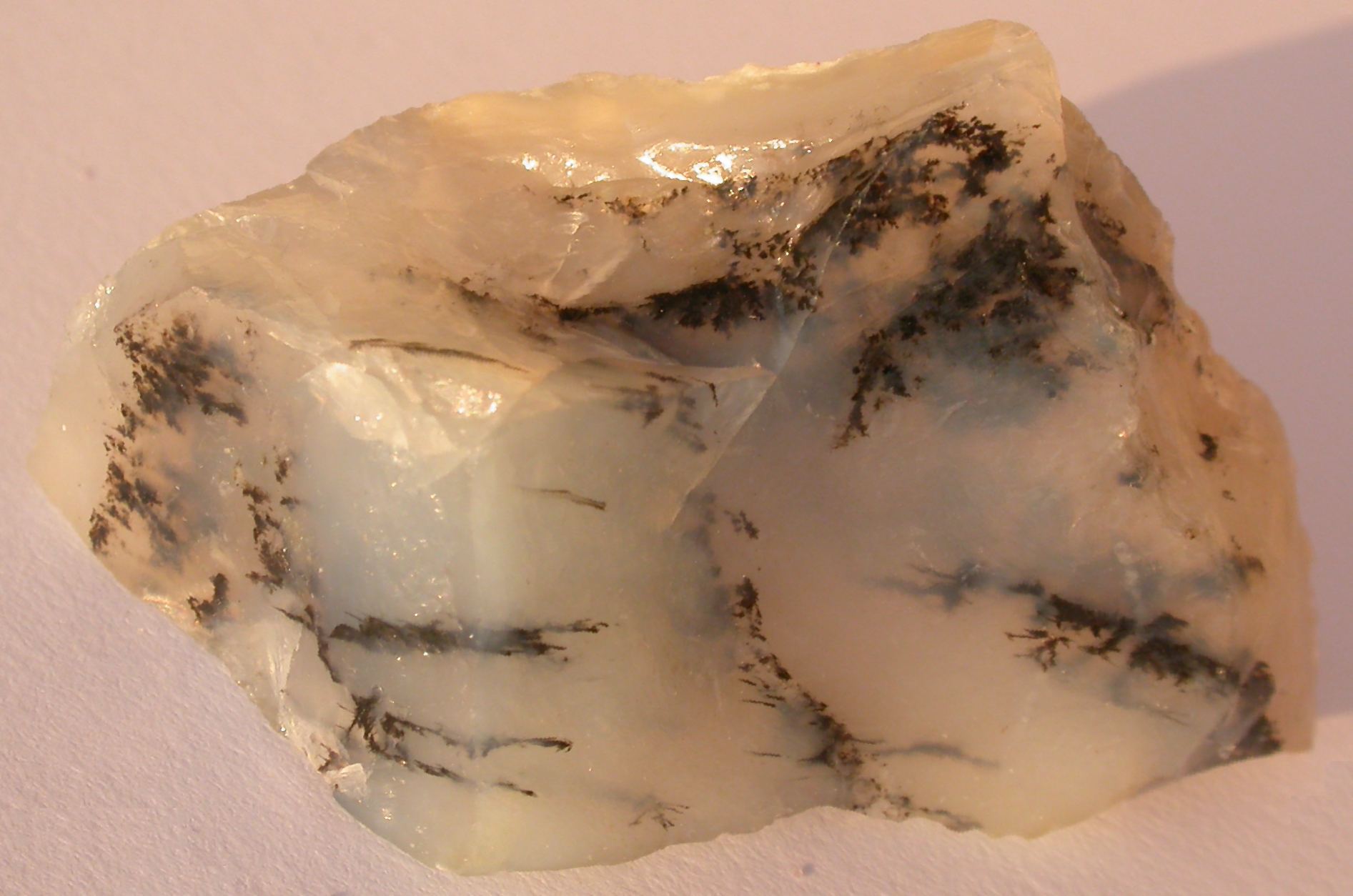
Moss opal

=== Greasy lustre ===
Greasy minerals resemble fat or grease. A greasy lustre often occurs in minerals containing a great abundance of microscopic inclusions, with examples including opal and cordierite, jadeite. Many minerals with a greasy lustre also feel greasy to the touch.

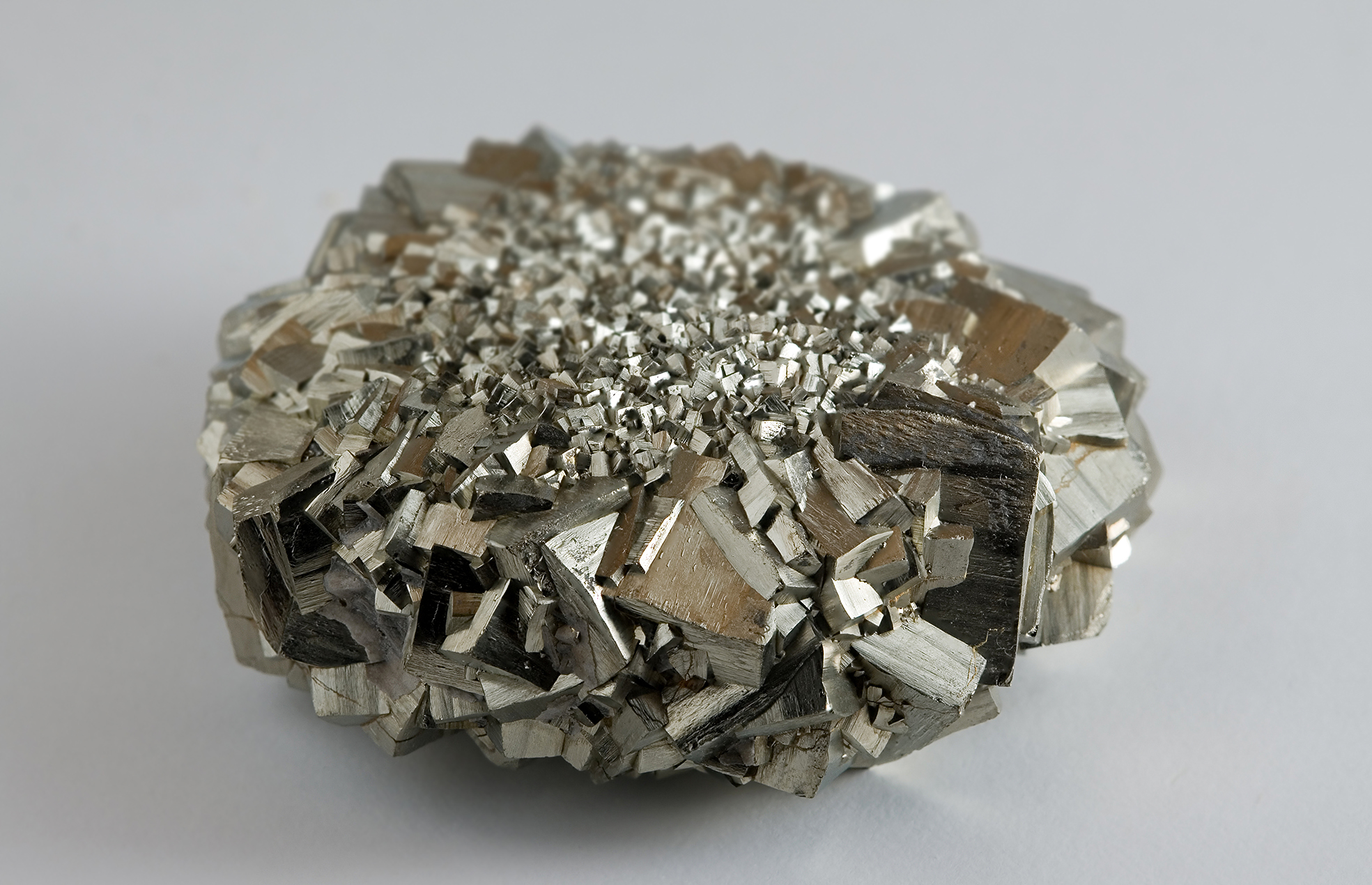
Pyrite

=== Metallic lustre ===
Metallic (or splendent) minerals have the lustre of polished metal, and with ideal surfaces will work as a reflective surface. Examples include galena, pyrite and magnetite.

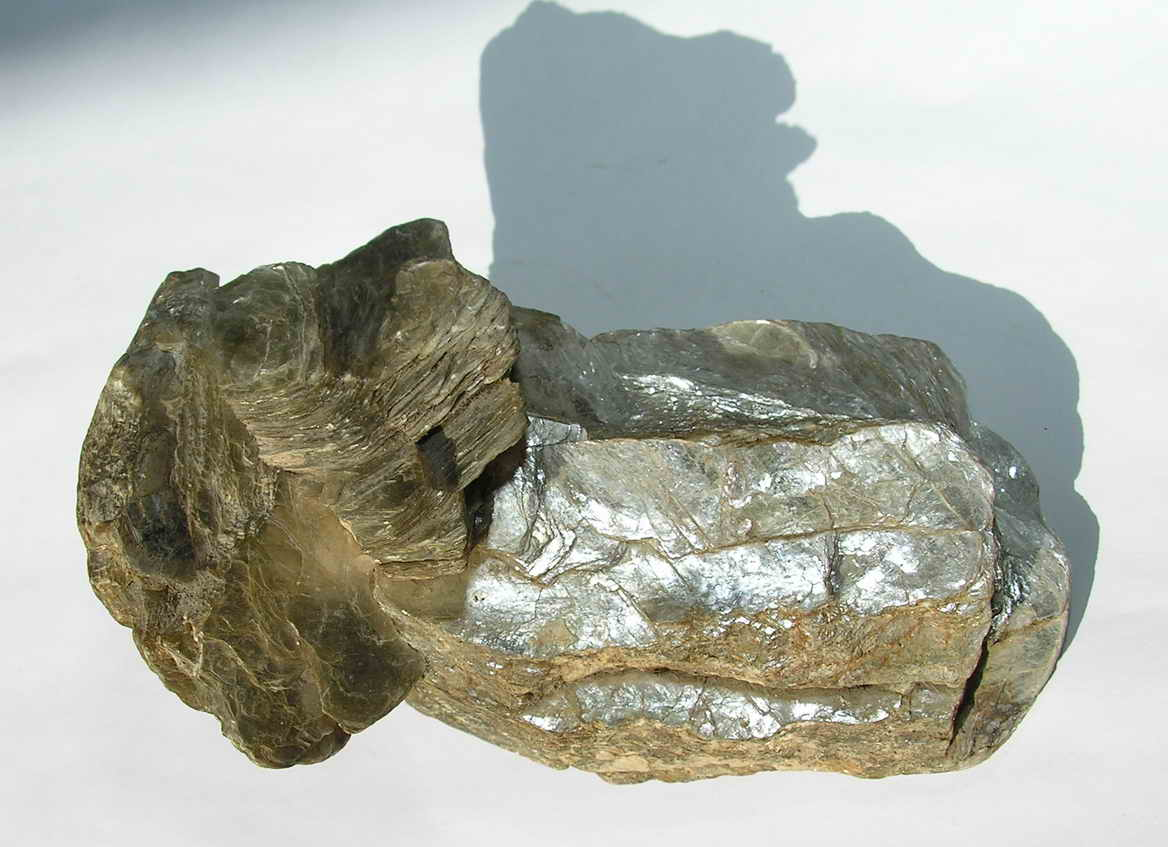
Muscovite

=== Pearly lustre ===
Pearly minerals consist of thin transparent co-planar sheets. Light reflecting from these layers gives them a lustre reminiscent of pearls. Such minerals possess perfect cleavage, with examples including muscovite and stilbite.

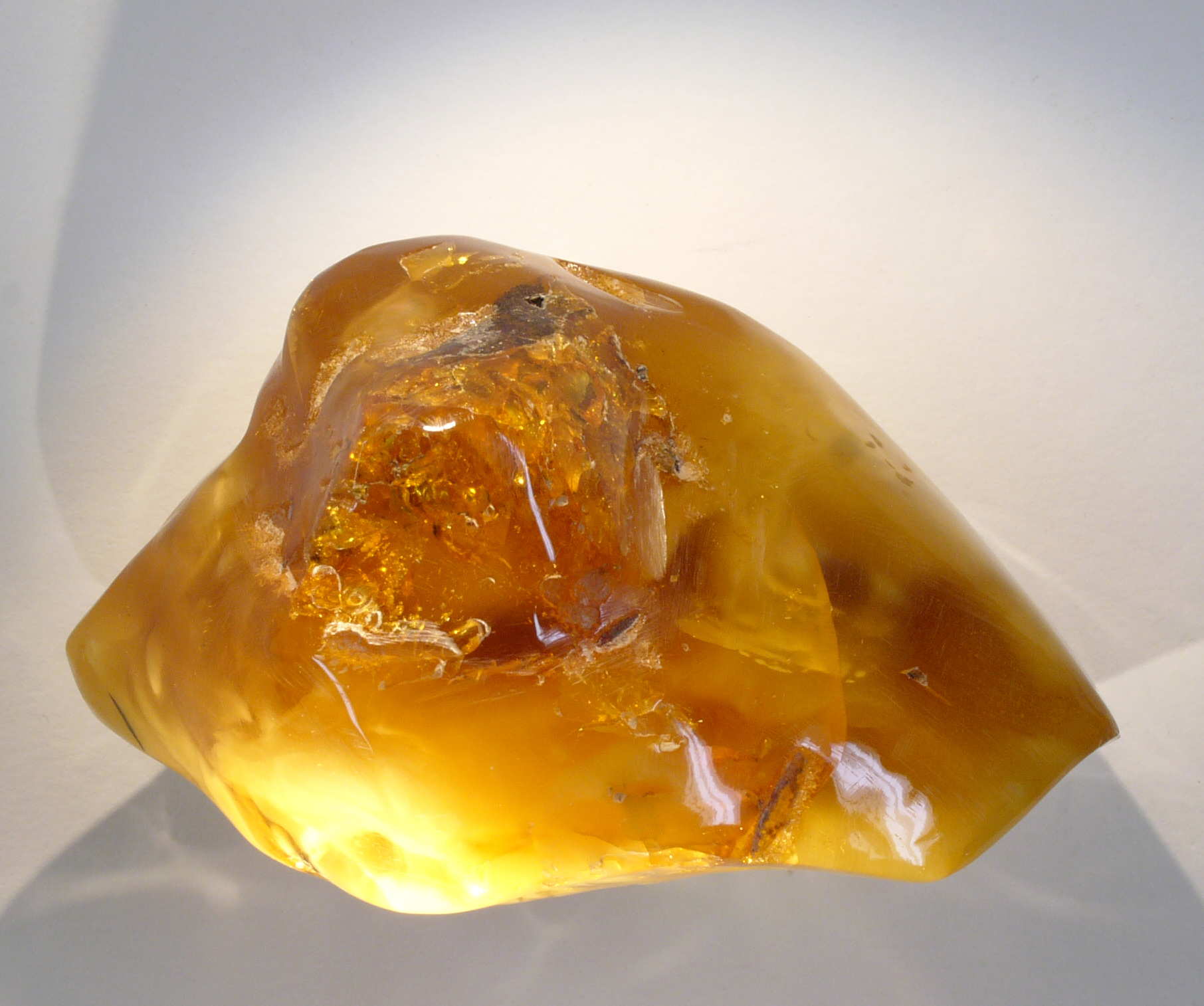
Amber

=== Resinous lustre ===
Resinous minerals have the appearance of resin, chewing gum or smooth-surfaced plastic.

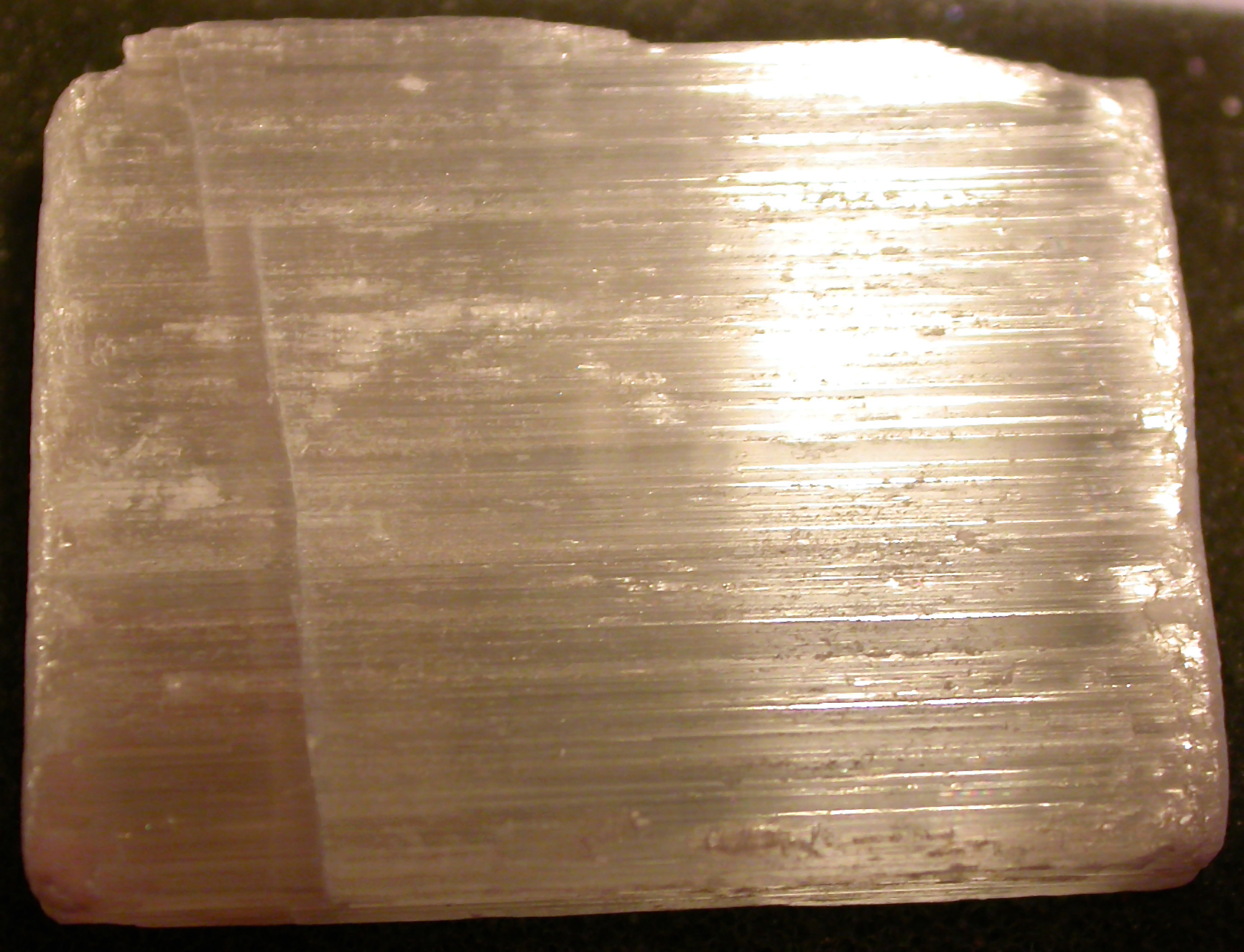
Satin spar variety of gypsum

=== Silky lustre ===
Silky minerals have a parallel arrangement of extremely fine fibres, giving them a lustre reminiscent of silk. Examples include asbestos, ulexite and the satin spar variety of gypsum. A fibrous lustre is similar, but has a coarser texture.

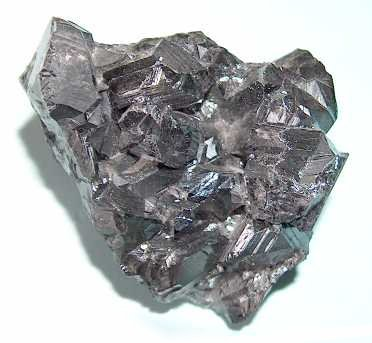
Sphalerite

=== Submetallic lustre ===
Submetallic minerals have similar lustre to metal, but are duller and less reflective. A submetallic lustre often occurs in near-opaque minerals with very high refractive indices, such as sphalerite, cinnabar, anthracite, and cuprite.

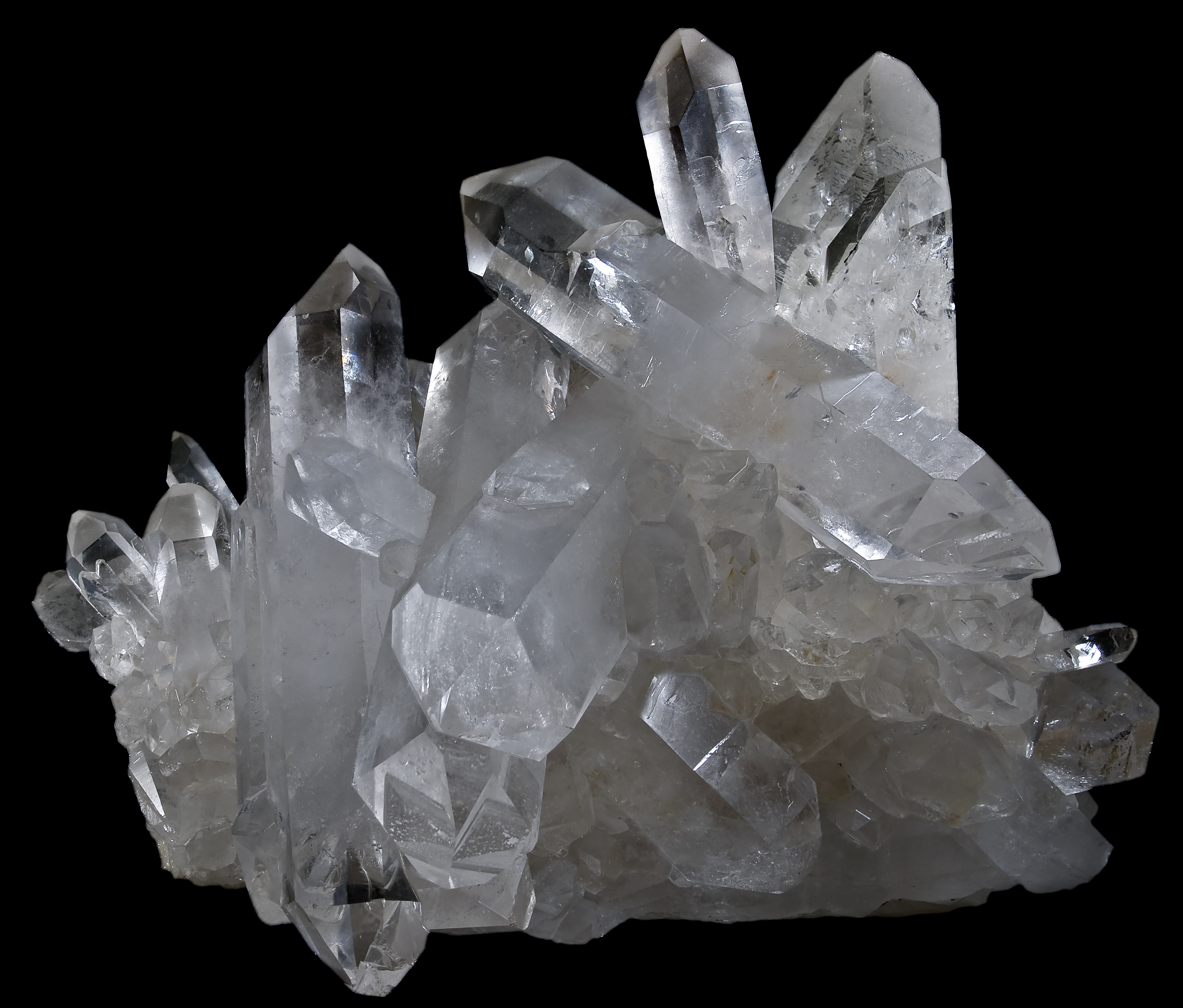
Quartz

=== Vitreous lustre ===
Vitreous minerals have the lustre of glass. (The term is derived from the Latin for glass, vitrum.) This type of lustre is one of the most commonly seen, and occurs in transparent or translucent minerals with relatively low refractive indices. Common examples include calcite, quartz, topaz, beryl, tourmaline and fluorite, among others.

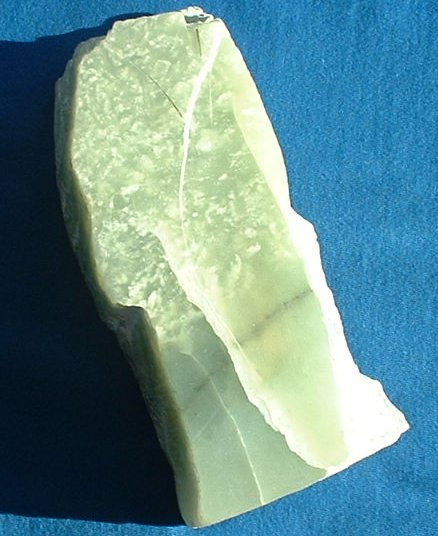
Jade

=== Waxy lustre ===
Waxy minerals have a lustre resembling wax. Examples include jade and chalcedony.

== Optical phenomena ==
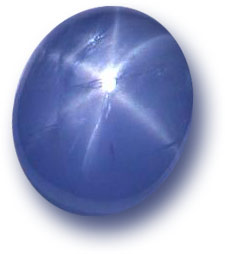
Sapphire

=== Asterism ===
Asterism is the display of a star-shaped luminous area. It is seen in some sapphires and rubies, where it is caused by impurities of rutile. It can also occur in garnet, diopside and spinel.

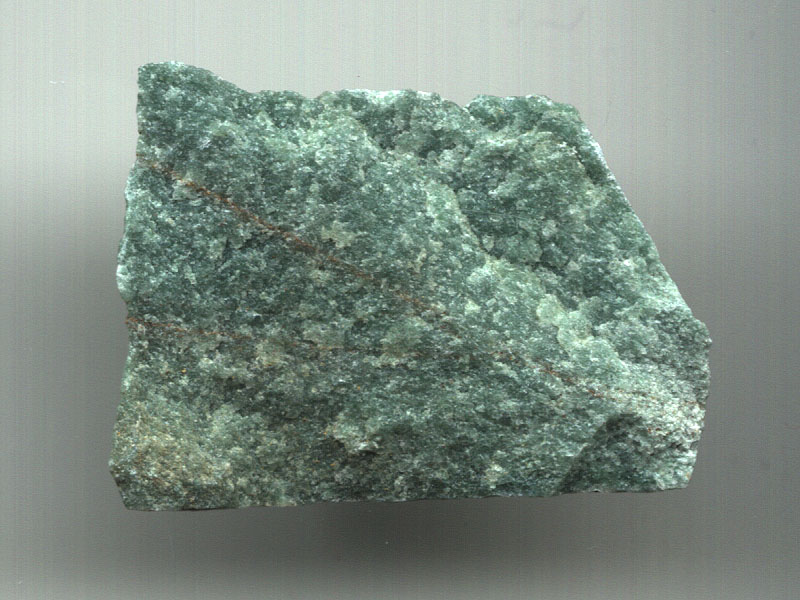
Aventurine

=== Aventurescence ===
Aventurescence (or aventurization) is a reflectance effect like that of glitter. It arises from minute, preferentially oriented mineral platelets within the material. These platelets are so numerous that they also influence the material's body colour. In aventurine quartz, chrome-bearing fuchsite makes for a green stone and various iron oxides make for a red stone.

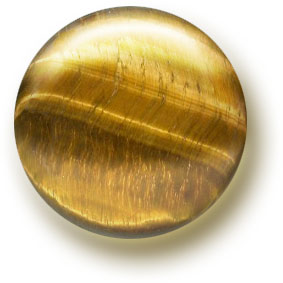
Tiger's eye

=== Chatoyancy ===
Chatoyant minerals display luminous bands, which appear to move as the specimen is rotated. Such minerals are composed of parallel fibres (or contain fibrous voids or inclusions), which reflect light into a direction perpendicular to their orientation, thus forming narrow bands of light. The most famous examples are tiger's eye and cymophane, but the effect may also occur in other minerals such as aquamarine, moonstone and tourmaline.

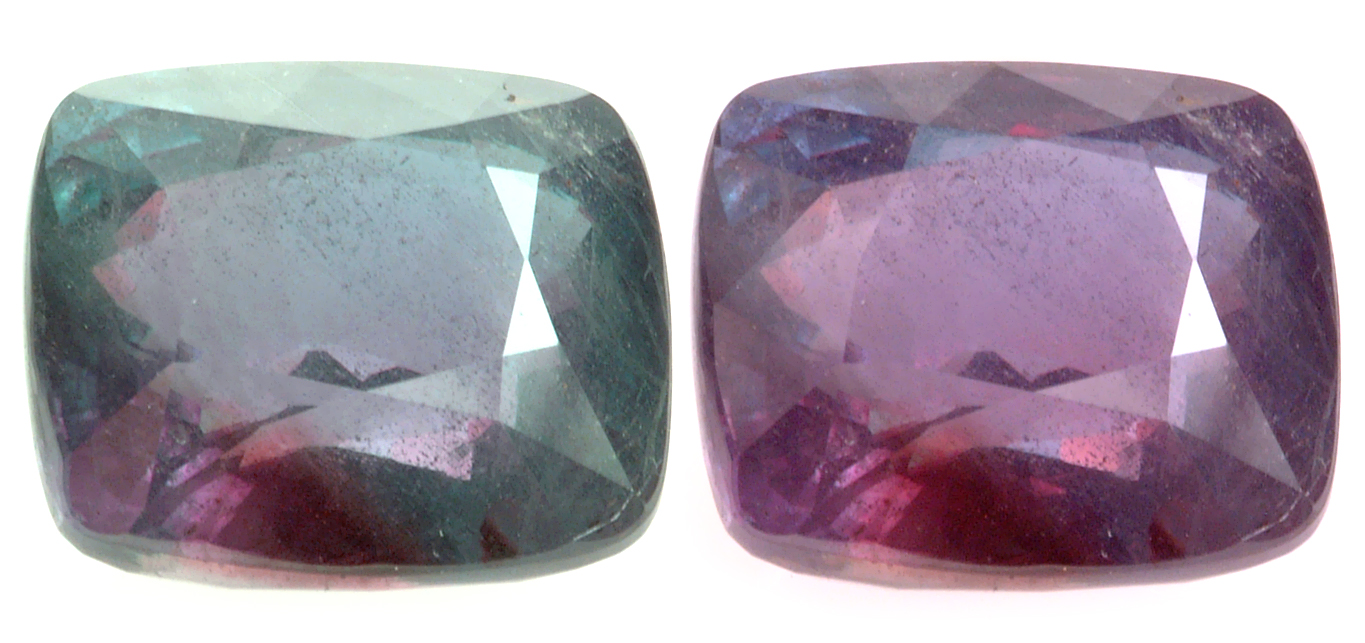
Alexandrite

=== Colour change ===
Colour change is most commonly found in alexandrite, a variety of chrysoberyl gemstones. Other gems also occur in colour-change varieties, including (but not limited to) sapphire, garnet, spinel. Alexandrite displays a colour change dependent upon light, along with strong pleochroism. The gem results from small-scale replacement of aluminium by chromium oxide, which is responsible for alexandrite's characteristic green to red colour change. Alexandrite from the Ural Mountains in Russia is green by daylight and red by incandescent light. Other varieties of alexandrite may be yellowish or pink in daylight and a columbine or raspberry red by incandescent light. The optimum or "ideal" colour change would be fine emerald green to fine purplish red, but this is rare.

=== Iridescence ===
Iridescence is the 'play' or 'fire' of rainbow-coloured light caused by very thin regular structures or layers beneath the surface of a gemstone. Similar to a thin film of oil on water, these layers interfere with the rays of reflected light, reinforcing some colours and cancelling others. Iridescence is seen at its best in precious opal.

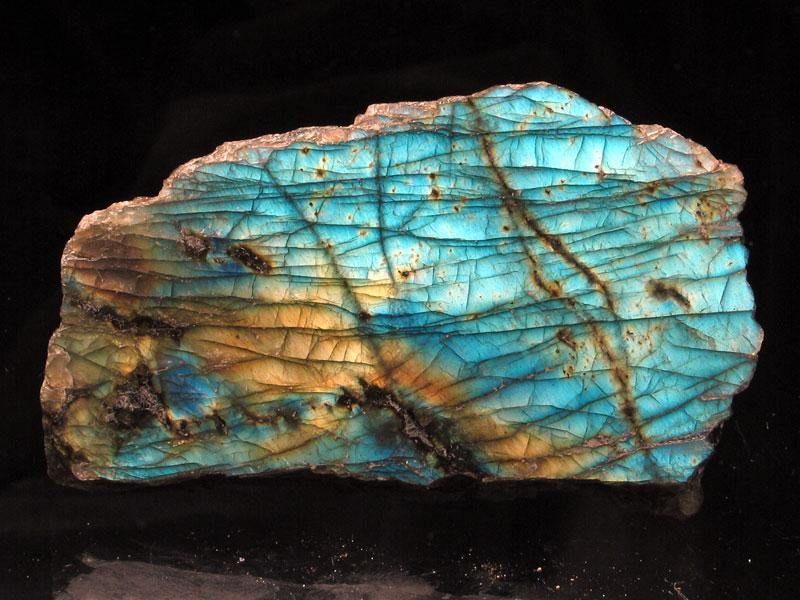
Labradorite

=== Schiller ===
Schiller (German, literally "shimmer"), is the metallic iridescence originating from below the surface of a stone that occurs when light is reflected between layers of minerals. It is seen in moonstone and labradorite and is very similar to adularescence and aventurescence.
