= International Journal of Hygiene and Environmental Health =

Academic journal

- Discipline: Environmental health
- Language: English
- Edited by: Antonia Calafat; Holger Koch

Publication details
- Former name(s): Archiv für Hygiene; Zentralblatt für Bakteriologie, Mikrobiologie und Hygiene; Zentralblatt fur Hygiene und Umweltmedizin
- History: 1883–present
- Publisher: Elsevier
- Frequency: 8/year
- Impact factor: 7.401 (2021)

Standard abbreviations
- ISO 4: Int. J. Hyg. Environ. Health

Indexing
- ISSN: 1438-4639 (print); 1618-131X (web)
- LCCN: 2009233387
- OCLC no.: 225490325

Links
- Journal homepage; Online access; Online archive

The International Journal of Hygiene and Environmental Health is a peer-reviewed scientific journal covering environmental health. It was established by Max von Pettenkofer in 1883 as Archiv für Hygiene, and it was originally focused exclusively on hygiene. It was later published under the title Zentralblatt für Hygiene und Umweltmedizin after 1971, and it obtained its current title in 2000. It is published 8 times per year by Elsevier and the editors-in-chief are Antonia Calafat (National Center for Environmental Health) and Holger Koch (German Social Accident Insurance). The journal's official website lists its 2021 Journal Citation Reports impact factor as 7.401.
