= Helenite =

Artificial glass made from volcanic ash

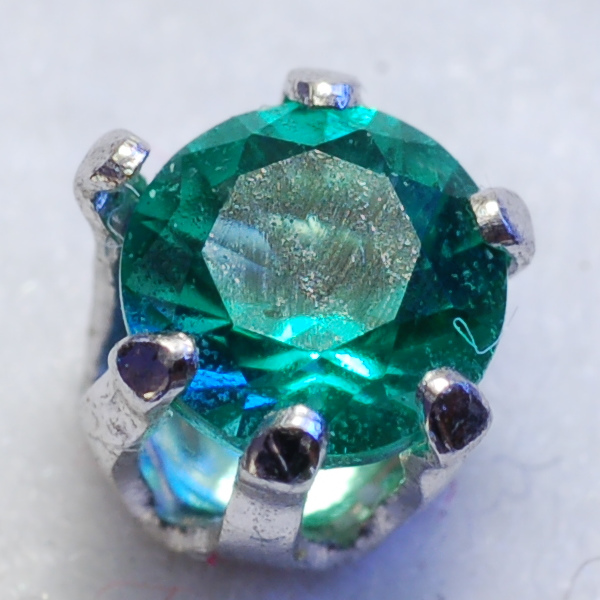
Helenite set in an earring

Helenite, also known as Mount St. Helens obsidian, emerald obsidianite, and ruby obsidianite, is a glass made from the fused volcanic rock dust from Mount St. Helens in the U.S state of Washington.

== Discovery ==
Helenite was first created accidentally after the eruption of Mount St. Helens in 1980. Workers from the Weyerhaeuser Timber Company were attempting to salvage equipment damaged after the volcanic eruption. Using acetylene torches, they noticed that the intense heat was melting the nearby volcanic ash and rock and turning it a greenish color. The silica, aluminium, iron, and trace amounts of chromium and copper present in the rocks and ash in the area, combined with the heat of the torches, transformed the volcanic particles into a compound that would be later commercially replicated as helenite.

As word of the discovery spread, jewelry companies took note and began to find ways to reproduce the helenite. Helenite is made by heating rock dust and particles from the Mount St. Helens area in a furnace to a temperature of approximately 2,700 °F (1,480 °C). Although helenite and obsidian are both forms of glass, helenite differs from obsidian in that it is made artificially, whereas obsidian is a naturally occurring mineral.

== Commercial use ==
It is seen as an inexpensive alternative to naturally occurring green gemstones, such as emerald and peridot. Helenite can be manufactured in various shades of red, green, and blue.

The stone has been marketed by the jewelry industry because of its emerald-like color and good refractive index, although its durability is low. It has a hardness of just 5 to 5½ and chips about as easily as obsidian or window glass. It is best used in earrings, pendants, brooches, and other types of jewelry where it will not encounter impact or abrasion. Even in these uses it should be considered to be a very delicate stone. If it is used as a ring stone, the facet edges will be easily abraded, the faces will be easily scratched, and the stone might be chipped with even a slight impact.

== See also ==
- Emerald (green beryl)
- Goldstone (glass)
- Olivine
- Paste gem
- Peridot
- Rhinestone
- Swarovski glass jewelry
- Tourmaline
