= Purpurin (glass) =

Opaque glass of the Ancient World

Purpurin (Italian: Porporino; Latin: Haematinum, derived from Greek haimátinos = "of blood"; German: Hämatinon), sometimes referred to as glass porphyr or porphyry glass, is an opaque glass of brownish to lustrous deep-reddish color which in classical antiquity was used for residential luxury objects, mosaics and various decorative purposes. Purpurin is somewhat harder than normal glass but can be easily cut and polished. Its red color is permanently lost upon melting. The material bears some resemblance to goldstone.

== Historical references and archeology ==
Purpurin artifacts are frequently found during archeological excavations of more affluent Roman settlements, often along with actual Roman glass; Pompeii is a prime example.

Pliny the Elder reports in his Historia naturalis: "Obsidian is made by artificial coloring and used for dishware, and also a completely red and opaque glass called haematinum." The art of making this type of glass seems to have originated in India; glass beads of a similar material have been found in the Indus valley and were dated to the late 2nd millennium BCE.

== Rediscovering the technology ==
The process for "haematinum" (i.e., "blood-red ware") has not been related in any preserved documents from antiquity, and the details of its composition and production remained a mystery until the mid-19th century. Although the German chemist Martin Heinrich Klaproth had found copper when he analyzed red glass from the Villa Jovis, he mistakenly believed the fabled haematinon was not glass, but rather recast slag from copper smelting. In 1844, Schubarth made a strong case for it being copper-colorated glass, which was later proven to be correct.

King Ludwig I of Bavaria, intending to build a reconstruction of a Pompeian villa for educational purposes, tasked Max Joseph von Pettenkofer to rediscover the method of manufacturing the antique "blood glass", and indeed the young chemist reported success in 1853. His process called for fusing easily smelting standard alkali-lead glass with copper(II) oxide and magnetite in the presence of small amounts of magnesium oxide and carbon, followed by very slow cooling of the resultant brown mass, which would then take on a deep red color from precipitating microparticles of reduced metallic copper.

Subsequently, Emanuel Kayser realized the brownish tint was attributable to co-precipitated metallic lead, and that this can be avoided by using borax instead of lead glass or lead oxide. His recipe consisted of 60 parts silicon oxide in the form of quartz sand, 10 parts calcined borax, 10 parts copper oxide, and 3 parts magnetite.
