= Max Joseph von Pettenkofer =

Bavarian chemist and hygienist (1818–1901)

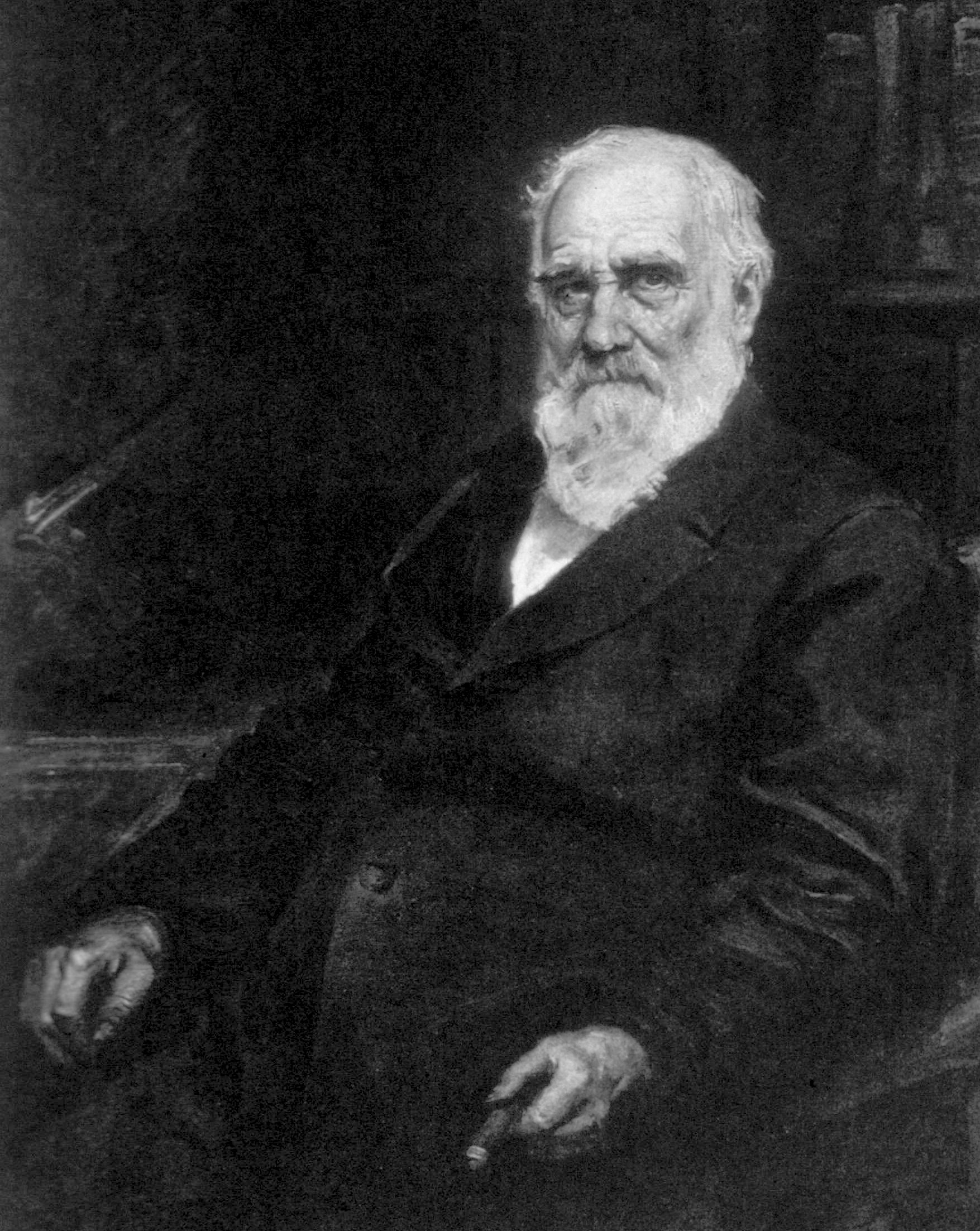
Max Joseph Pettenkofer

Max Joseph Pettenkofer, ennobled in 1883 as Max Joseph von Pettenkofer (3 December 1818 – 10 February 1901) was a Bavarian chemist and hygienist. He is known for his work in practical hygiene, as an apostle of good water, fresh air and proper sewage disposal. He was further known as an anti-contagionist, a school of thought, named later on, that did not believe in the then novel concept that bacteria were the main cause of disease. In particular he argued in favor of a variety of conditions collectively contributing to the incidence of disease including: personal state of health, the fermentation of environmental ground water, and also the germ in question. He was most well known for his establishment of hygiene as an experimental science and also was a strong proponent for the founding of hygiene institutes in Germany. His work served as an example which other institutes around the world emulated.

== Early life and education ==
Pettenkofer was born in Lichtenheim, near Neuburg an der Donau, now part of Weichering. He was a nephew of Franz Xaver (1783–1850), who from 1823 was a surgeon and apothecary to the Bavarian court and was the author of some chemical investigations on the vegetable alkaloids. After a falling out with a relative he was staying with he briefly entered the theater. He returned to his family to marry Helene Pettenkofer. A stipulation of his marriage was that he pursue another career and was advised to pursue medicine. He attended the Wilhelmsgymnasium in Munich, then studied pharmacy and medicine at the Ludwig-Maximilians-Universität München where he graduated M.D. in 1845.

== Career as chemist ==
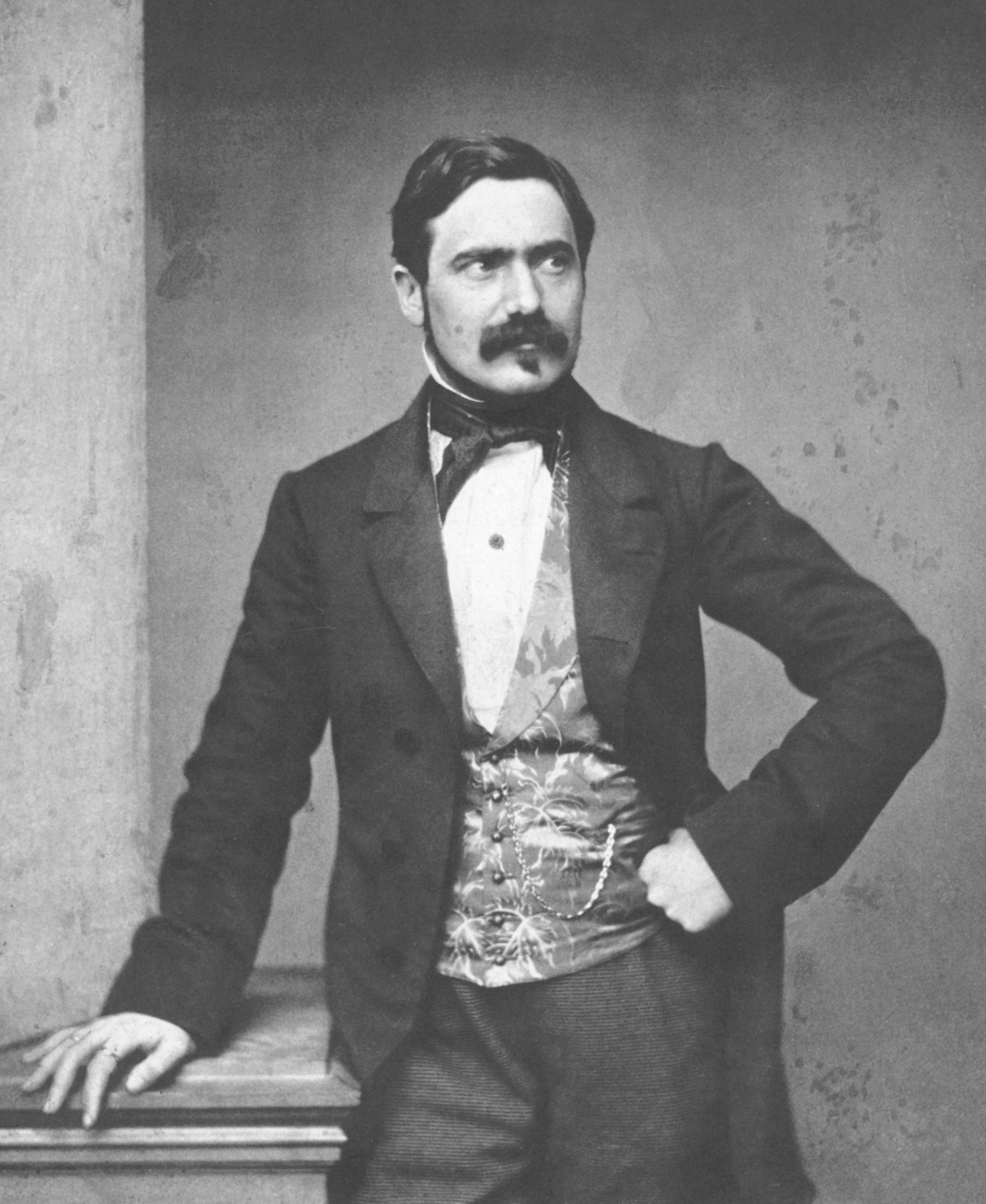
Max Joseph Pettenkofer

After working under Justus von Liebig at the University of Giessen, Pettenkofer was appointed chemist to the Bavarian State Mint in Munich in 1845. Two years later, he was chosen as an extraordinary professor of chemistry at the medical faculty at the Ludwig-Maximilians-Universität München. In 1853, he was made a full professor and in 1865 also became a professor of hygiene. In his earlier years, he devoted himself to chemistry, both theoretical and applied, publishing papers on a wide range of topics. One of his first projects and subsequent publications was in the separation of gold, silver, and platinum. This work derived from his position at the Bavarian State Mint and was centered around minimizing the costs of currency conversion by separating the precious metals from one another. The purer elements could then be utilized in other applications. Later in his career, he continued published and spoke about the numerical relations between the atomic masses of analogous elements. His theories were early in the development of the Periodic Table. He rejected the current theory of triads and expanded the connections between the elements to larger groupings. He argued that the weights of different elements in a group were separated by multiples of a certain number that varied based upon the group. His work in this area was later cited by Dmitri Mendeleev in his construction of the Periodic Table of Elements. He continued his publications in a wide variety of other fields as well including: the formation of aventurine glass, the manufacture of illuminating gas from wood, the preservation of oil paintings, and an improved process for cement production among other things. The color-forming reaction known by his name for the detection of bile acids was published in 1844. In his widely used method for the quantitative determination of carbonic acid the gaseous mixture is shaken up with baryta or limewater of known strength and the change in alkalinity ascertained by means of oxalic acid. He further provided the experimental proof that the mysterious haematinum of ancient times was in fact a copper-colored glass.

== Career as hygienist ==
Pettenkofer's name is most familiar in connection with his work in practical hygiene, as an apostle of good water, fresh air and proper sewage disposal. His attention was drawn to this subject by the unhealthy condition in Munich in the 19th century. Specifically he examined the field of hygiene and determined that there was a minimal amount of rigorous research. He was responsible for transitioning the field of hygiene into a research-oriented field. He is further responsible for the acceptance of hygiene as a science to be examined in medical schools and to be taught in specific hygiene departments. In 1865, his petitions to the government were accepted and three departments of hygiene were established in Munich, Würzburg, and Erlangen. By 1882, hygiene was included in examinations for medical students in every major city of Germany. As one of the principal proponents for the field of hygiene in Munich, he was responsible for giving presentations to government officials in order to secure funding for public health projects.

One of the prevailing arguments of the day that Pettenkofer focused on was the relationship between sewage and the health of a population. In one of his first major projects in his home city of Munich, Pettenkofer advocated for the development of running water throughout the city. He also emphasized the selection of the Mangfall river, not the readily at hand and highly polluted Isar river, as the source of the city's drinking water. Many of his additions and plans for the city's sewage system are reflected today in the current sewage system layout.

During his schooling he studied for a time under Justus von Liebig where he applied his study of chemistry to the study of chemical reactions occurring within the body. This in particular focused on the study of the science of nutrition and the reactions in the body that consumed foods and produced the processes of the body. He further advocated for reform of the food production system used in Munich. He argued that the system for the study of proper cattle feed was more well developed than that for humans and recommended civic funding for studying proper nutrition. He proposed that this study of nutrition was important specifically for the poor and those in strictly controlled environments such as prison because they were most at risk for obtaining sub-par nutrition due to their limited control over their food consumption.

He further advocated for the construction of more spacious living accommodations. He asserted that there was a strong link between proper circulation of "good air" through houses, adequate space for living, and the health of the occupants. His beliefs aligned significantly with the school of thought known as the Miasma theory. He firmly believed that the causes of disease were related to the multitude of environmental factors that the people of Munich were required to live in. Air was of a particular interest to him and he continued to advocate for its relevance to the processes of disease, specifically the spread of cholera. He was also a strong proponent of regular bathing and changing of clothes in its relationship to health through the further regulation of the heat of the body. He advocated that health was the collective responsibility of a city to behave as best they are able to further the health of the general population.

In addition to the wide number of publications and lectures that he gave on the subject of public health, Pettenkofer was also involved in the initiative to create an Institute of Public Health in Munich. He continued research into a variety of fields listed above as head of the Institute of Physiology in Munich from 1857 onwards. After numerous successful audiences with two of the kings of Bavaria he had helped found the first three hygiene departments. In 1879, he finally achieved his goal of the creation of a standalone Institute of Hygiene in Munich. This institution was larger than his previous accommodations in the department of Physiology and allowed him to continue to his research and to gather a large cohort of research students under his teachings. The founding of his Institute of Hygiene drew significant international attention and was considered a model for many later institutions including the Johns Hopkins School of Hygiene and Public Health in Baltimore.

During his career his position as a strong proponent of public health at times placed him at odds with his contemporaries, most notably Robert Koch. During his career, Koch identified and isolated a large number of bacterial strains and was a supporter of the theory that these germs were the main causes of disease. This placed him at odds with Pettenkofer's broader approach to disease that involved many other environmental factors in addition to the activity of the germ of a disease. The two scientists conflicted most notably over the subject of cholera. In one specific case, Pettenkofer obtained bouillon laced with a large dose of Vibrio cholerae bacteria from Koch, the proponent of the theory that the bacterium was the sole cause of the disease. He consumed the bouillon in a self-test in the presence of several witnesses on 7 October 1892. He also took bicarbonate of soda to neutralise his stomach acid to counter a suggestion by Koch that the acid could kill the bacteria. He did not contract the disease, nor did he become unwell. This launched a shadow of doubt over Koch veracity about his claims that the Vibrio cholerae bacteria is responsible for causing the cholera disease.

== Publications ==
Pettenkofer published his views on hygiene and disease in numerous books and papers; he was an editor of the Zeitschrift für Biologie (together with Carl von Voit) from 1865 to 1882, and of the Archiv für Hygiene from 1883 to 1894. In addition to his research publications he also gave a significant number of lectures to government officials in order to persuade them to provide funding for civic works and governmental oversight committees to promote and assess the state public health.

Pettenkofer appeared in Scientific American in 1883 discussing carbon monoxide poisoning resulting from coal gas leaks in public spaces, noting endogenous carbon monoxide is always detectable in the sick and dead as carboxyhemoglobin. In the same magazine, Pettenkofer is recognized to have developed an accurate quantitative analysis method for determining atmospheric carbon dioxide.

The 1899 handwritten manuscript 'On the self purification of rivers' and Pettenkofer's papers can be found at the archives of the London School of Hygiene & Tropical Medicine.

== Death ==
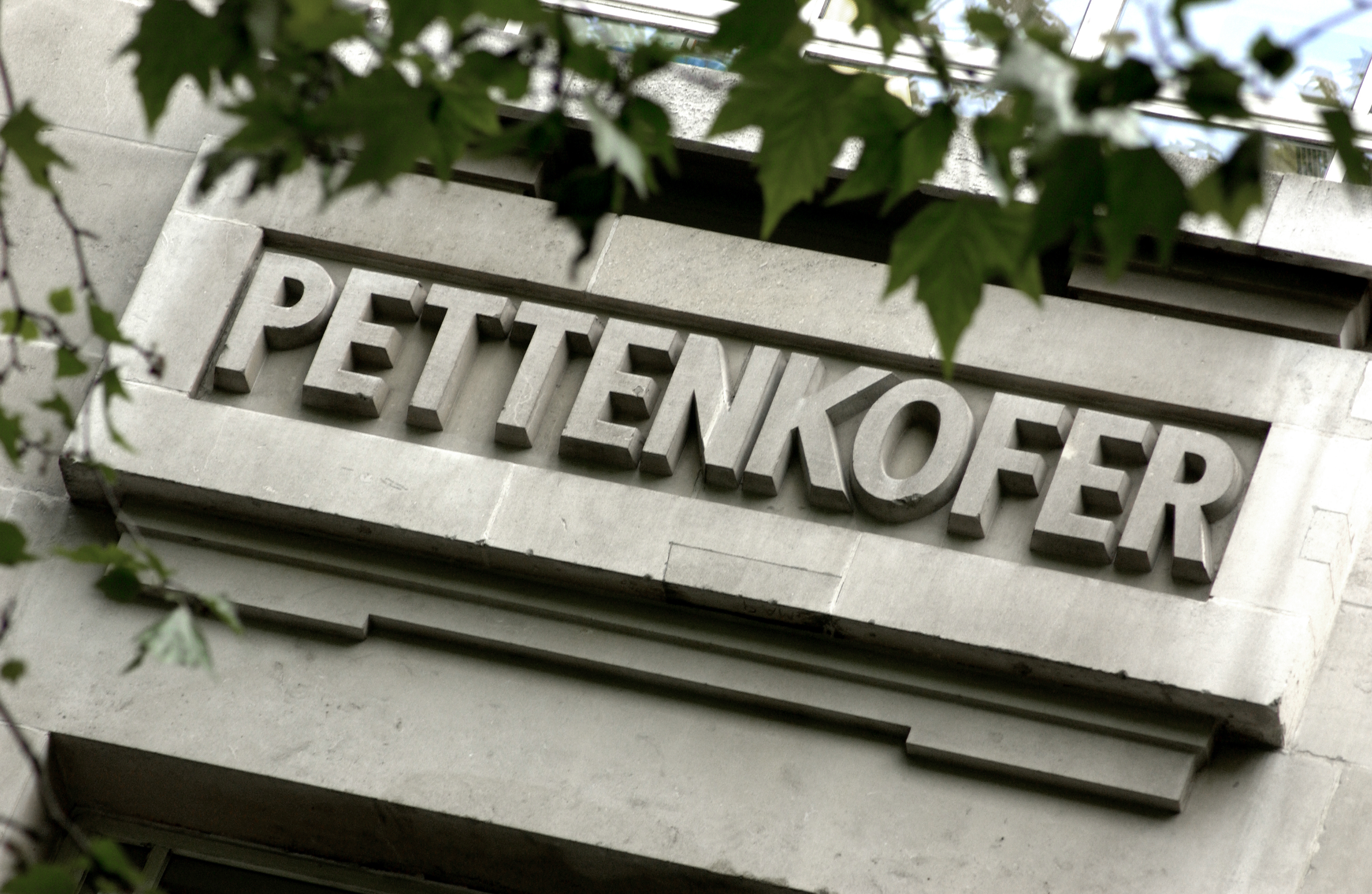
Pettenkofer's name of the LSHTM Frieze in Keppel Street

In 1894 he retired from active work, and on 10 February 1901 he shot himself in a fit of depression. He died at his home in the Residenz in Munich. He is buried in the Alter Südfriedhof in Munich.

== Recognition ==
During his lifetime he received numerous accolades. He was presented with the title of "Honorary Citizen" of Munich and given a gold medal. His work in hygiene precipitated the creation of the "Pettenkofer Foundation for Research in Hygiene" which received funding from the cities of Munich and Leipzig to fund research projects related to Hygiene and Public Health.

In 1883 he was awarded a hereditary title of nobility and was given the title "Excellency."

In 1897 he was awarded the Harlen Medal from the British Institute of Public Health.

Max Joseph von Pettenkofer's name features on the Frieze of the London School of Hygiene & Tropical Medicine. Twenty-three pioneers of public health and tropical medicine were chosen to feature on the School's building when it was constructed in 1929.

== See also ==
- History of environmentalism in Germany
