= Sunstone =

Brown-orange feldspar

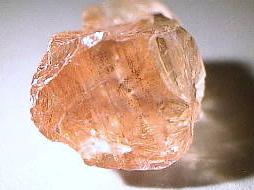

General
- Category: Tectosilicate minerals
- Group: Feldspar group
- Series: Alkali feldspar series
- Formula: (Ca,Na)((Al,Si)_{2}Si_{2}O_{8})
- IMA status: Variety of microcline or oligoclase
- Crystal system: Triclinic

Identification
- Color: Colorless, orange, yellow, red, green, blue, brown, and copper shiller
- Crystal habit: Euhedral crystals, granular
- Twinning: Lamellar
- Cleavage: 001
- Mohs scale hardness: 6.0–6.5
- Diaphaneity: Transparent to translucent and opaque
- Specific gravity: 2.64–2.66
- Refractive index: 1.525–1.58

Sunstone is a microcline or oligoclase feldspar, which when viewed from certain directions exhibits a spangled appearance. It has been found in Southern Norway, Sweden, various localities in the United States, and on some beaches along the midcoast of South Australia.

== Properties ==
=== Physical properties ===
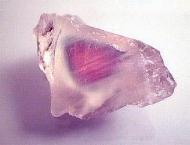
Unpolished sunstone

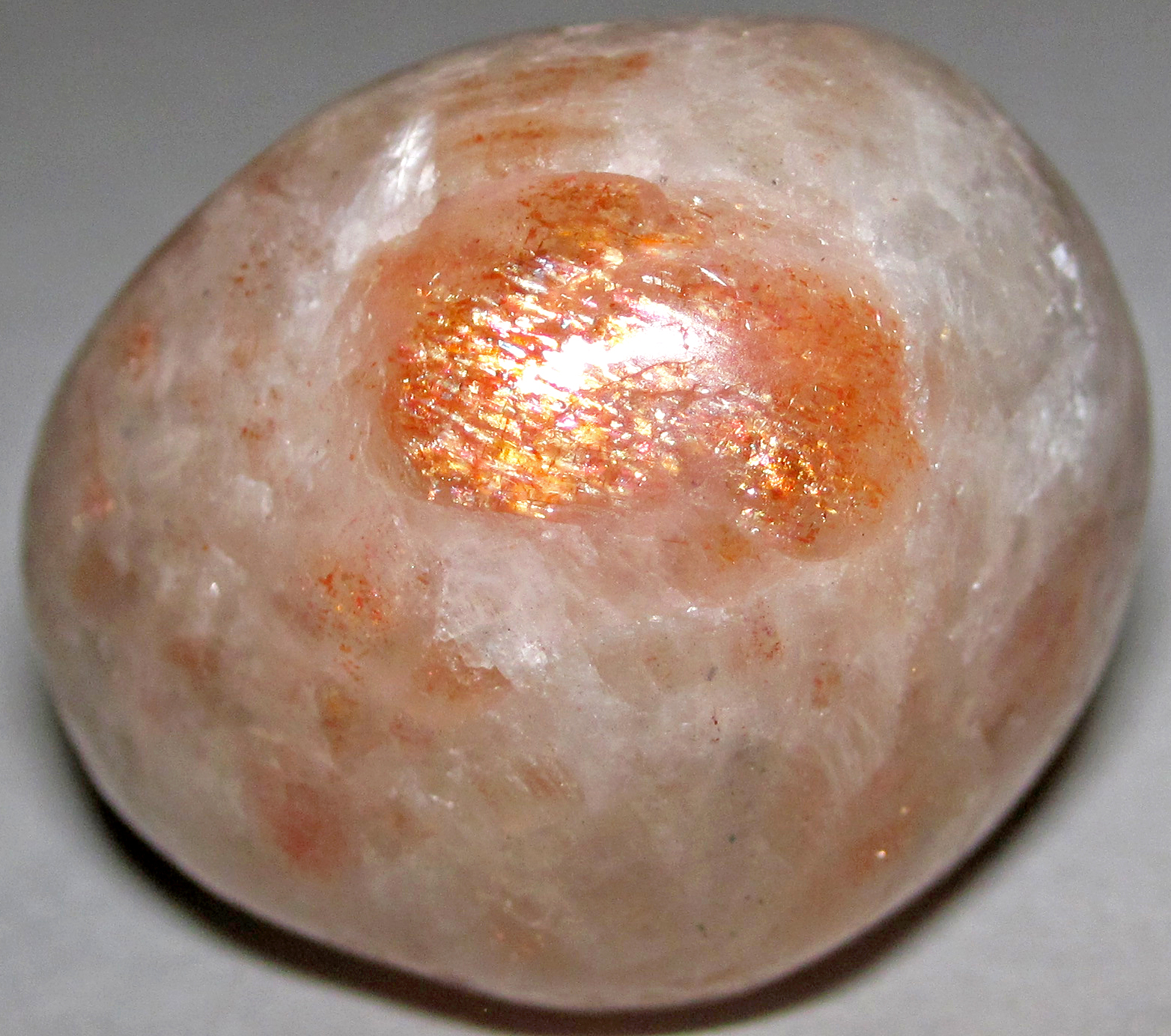
A tumbled sunstone

The optical effect is due to reflections from inclusions of red copper, hematite, or goethite, in the form of minute scales, which are hexagonal, rhombic, or irregular in shape, and are disposed parallel to the principal cleavage-plane. These inclusions give the stone an appearance something like that of aventurine, hence sunstone is known also as "aventurine-feldspar". The optical effect is called schiller and the color of Oregon Sunstone is due to copper. The middle part of this crystal sparkles, and usually the color is darkest in the middle and becomes lighter toward the outer edges.

The feldspar which usually displays the aventurine appearance is oligoclase, though the effect is sometimes seen in orthoclase: Hence two kinds of sunstone are distinguished as "oligoclase sunstone" and "orthoclase sunstone".

== Distribution ==
Sunstone was not popular until recently. Previously the best-known locality being Tvedestrand Municipality in Agder county in southern Norway, where masses of the sunstone occur embedded in a vein of quartz running through gneiss.

Other locations include near Lake Baikal in Siberia, and several United States localities – notably at Middletown Township, Delaware County, Pennsylvania; Plush, Oregon; and Statesville, North Carolina.

The "orthoclase sunstone" variant has been found near Crown Point and at several other localities in New York, as also at Glen Riddle in Delaware County, Pennsylvania, and at Amelia Courthouse, Amelia County, Virginia.

Sunstone is also found in Pleistocene basalt flows at Sunstone Knoll in Millard County, Utah.

== Oregon sunstone ==
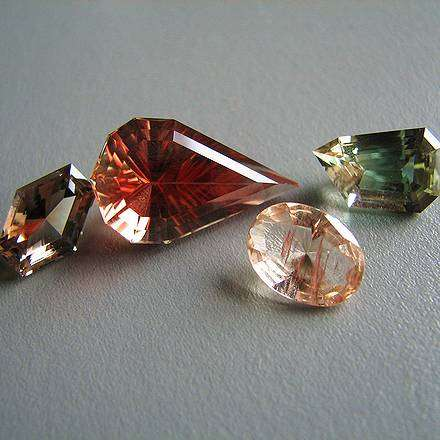
Various gem colors of Oregon sunstone

A variety known as "Oregon sunstone" is found in Harney County, Oregon and in eastern Lake County north of Plush. Oregon Sunstone contains elemental copper. Oregon Sunstone is unique in that crystals can be quite large. The copper leads to variant color within some stones, where turning one stone will result in manifold hues: The more copper within the stone, the darker the complexion.

On 4 August 1987, the Oregon State Legislature designated Oregon Sunstone as its state gemstone by joint resolution.

== Andesine controversy ==
In the early 2000s, a new variety of red or green gemstone resembling sunstone and called "andesine" appeared in the gem market. After much controversy and debate, most of these gemstones, allegedly sourced from China, were subsequently discovered to have been artificially colored by a copper diffusion process. A Tibetan source of bona fide (untreated) red andesine, however, was eventually verified by a number of independent groups of well-respected gemologists.

== See also ==
- Andesine
- Feldspar
- Rainbow lattice sunstone
