= Rainbow lattice sunstone =

Australian feldspar with geometric inclusions

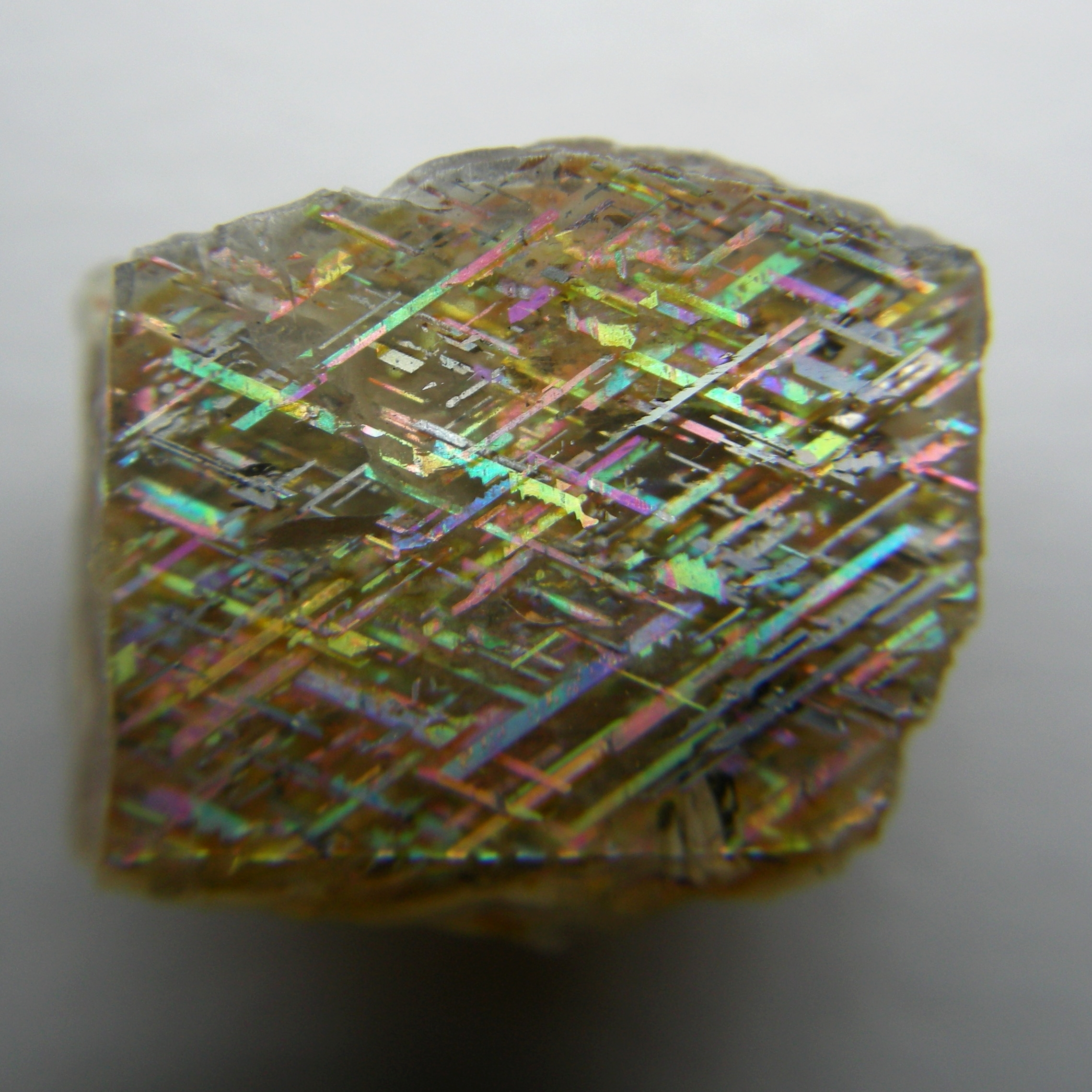
- Rainbow lattice sunstone

General
- Category: Tectosilicate minerals
- Group: Feldspar group
- Series: Alkali feldspar series
- Formula: KAlSi_{3}O_{8}
- IMA status: Variety of orthoclase

Identification
- Color: Multicolored

Rainbow lattice sunstone, also known as rainbow lattice, is a type of orthoclase feldspar that exhibits a rare combination of aventurescence, adularescence, and a distinctive iridescence lattice pattern. The iridescence lattice pattern consists of inclusions that are the result of crystallographically oriented exsolution crystals within the feldspar crystal. Sunstone refers to its physical appearance instead of its chemical composition.

Rainbow lattice sunstone is produced from a remote part of the Australian desert known as the Mud Tank Zircon Field. It is an area consisting of dry plains with rocky outcrops that lies in the Harts Range north-east of Alice Springs, Northern Territory, Australia. The primary source of this sunstone is covered by a single mining claim about 500 by 600 meters (1,600 by 2,000 ft) in size. Lower-quality rainbow lattice sunstone is produced at another claim about 7 kilometers (4.3 mi) away from the primary source.

== Inclusions ==
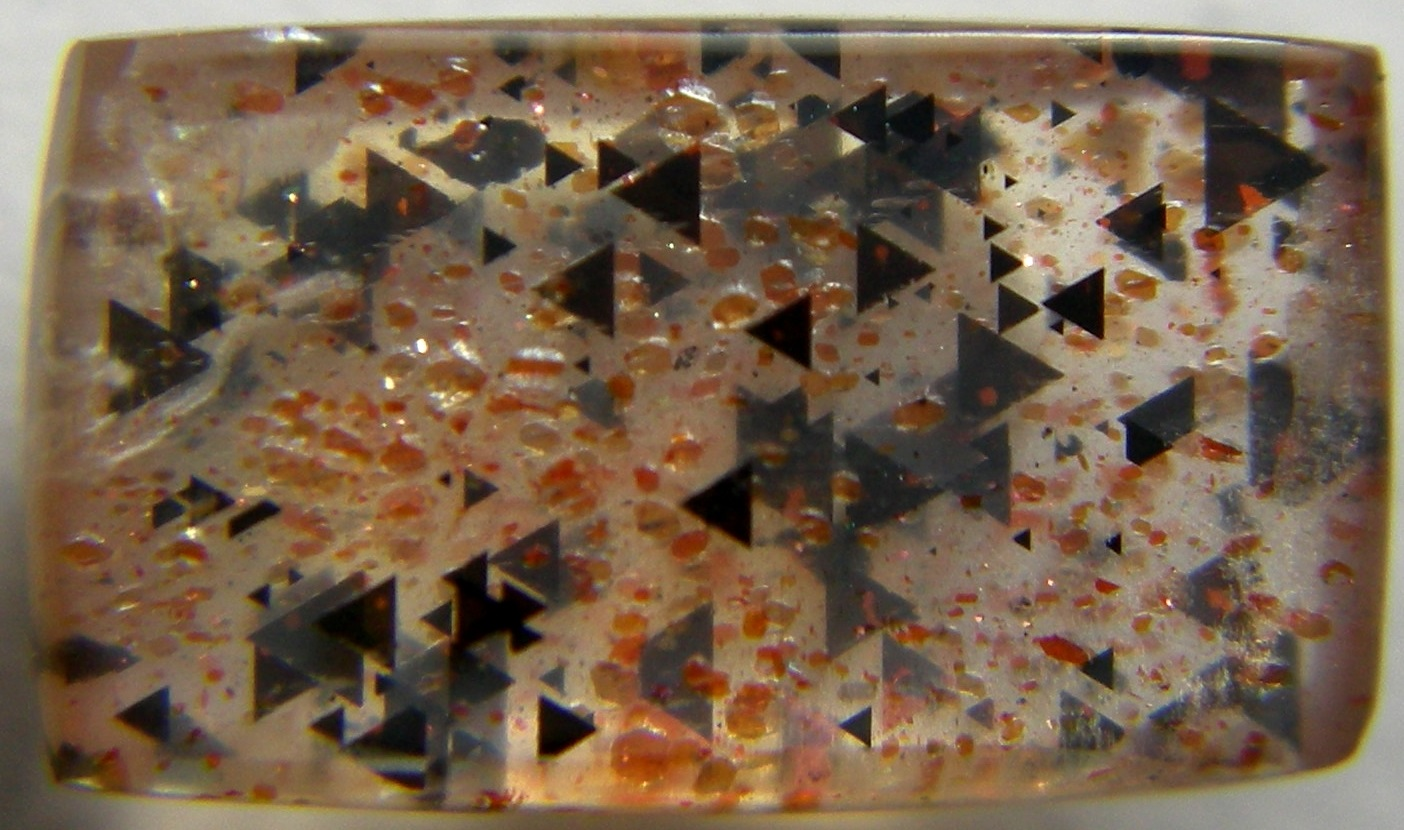
Rainbow lattice sunstone with hematite and magnetite equilateral triangle inclusions

Initially, the study of this gemstone in 1989 concluded that the inclusions were made up of ilmenite (for the iridescence lattice and black triangles) and hematite (for the orange platelets). From 2017 to 2018, six samples of rainbow lattice sunstone were studied using electron microprobe analysis, X-ray diffraction analysis, and laser Raman spectroscopy. It was found that the host mineral is orthoclase (Or_{96}Ab_{4}), as previously reported in the literature and the inclusions causing the aventurescence are hematite. This research also discovered that the lattice patterns consist of orangey brown platelets of hematite and the black platelets consist of magnetite.

Hematite (Fe_{2}O_{3}) which are small mainly yellow to deep orange platelets which can be hexagonal shape and are generally in one plane within the feldspar. This effect is called aventurescence or sunstone effect which gives some of the gems an orange glow. Hematite also forms as very thin blades that occur on one plane in different directions. These blades are oriented in different directions by a process known as lamellar twinning and also displays sagenitic twinning, which forms the lattice pattern.

Magnetite (Fe_{3}O_{4}) forms black, equilateral triangles. The magnetite that has no alteration is black with a metallic sheen.

== History ==
Rainbow lattice sunstone was first discovered in late 1985 by Darren Arthur and Sonny Mason, on a small claim owned by Mason. The original source is located at what is now known as the Rainbow Caterpillar Mine, in the Harts Range northeast of Alice Springs in the Northern Territory of Australia. It was identified at the GIA and declared a new gem variety in 1989. After Mason's death, Arthur went to co-found Asterism Gems, a company which was set up to market and sell the gemstones.

== Similar sunstone ==
Specimens of potassium feldspar that display a phenomenon remarkably similar to Rainbow lattice sunstone have been found in the area of Statesville, North Carolina. This material contains brown and black exsolution platelets of hematite and ilmenite that show thin-film interference colors along the interface with the host feldspar. Its base colors include blue-gray, tan, and pink. Fine hematite inclusions are apparently responsible for the pink color. Very few of these potassium feldspar crystals are suitable as a gemstone because they are typically quite brittle and tend to break along cleavage during cutting. The source rock of this material is a biotite gneiss.
