= Smoked glass =

Type of glass

Smoked glass is glass held in the smoke of a candle flame (or other inefficiently burning hydrocarbon) such that one surface of the sheet of glass is covered in a layer of smoke residue. The glass is used as a medium for recording pen traces in scientific instruments, and is also used to track pheromone deposition in ants

The advantages of using the smoked glass are that the recording medium is easily renewable (the glass can be easily re-smoked), and that the trace obtained can easily be projected and magnified. A variation on this scheme is the use of smoked paper in early seismographs.

A smoked glass can be created by adding darkening materials during manufacturing to decrease the brightness of light passing through the glass. It can be used aesthetically, for decoration. It can also be used in scientific instruments as a filter, such as in cross-staves and sextants, allowing operators to make sun sightings without damaging their eyesight.

== See also ==
- Window film
