= Aventurescence =

Optical reflectance effect seen in certain gems

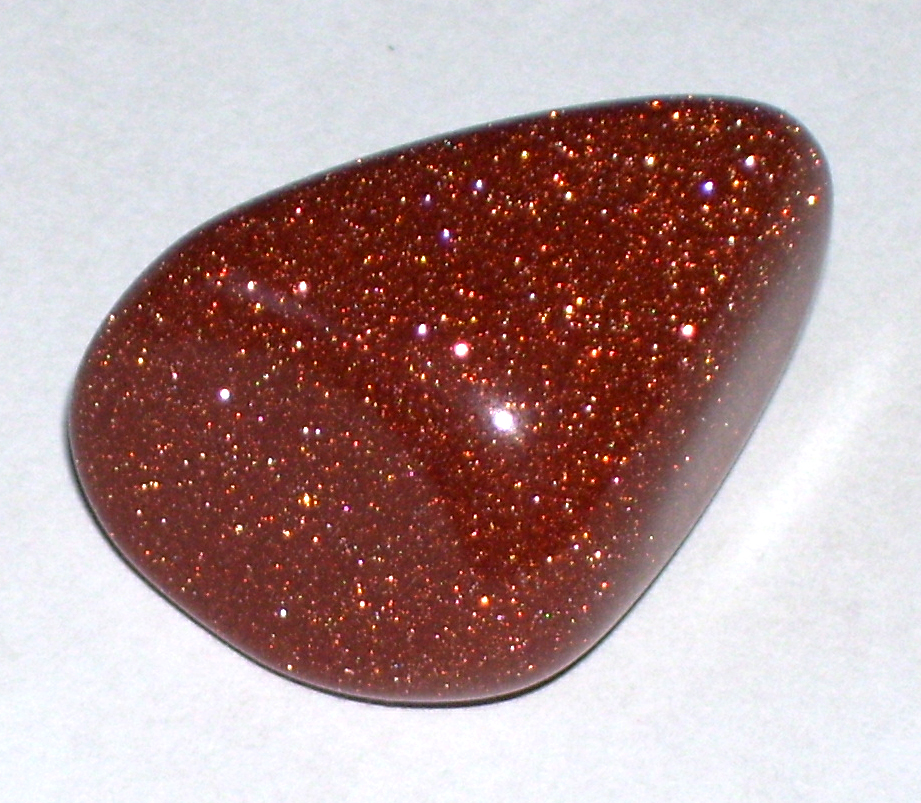
Goldstone showing aventurescence

In gemology, aventurescence (sometimes called aventurization) is an optical reflectance effect seen in certain gems. The effect amounts to a metallic glitter, arising from minute, preferentially oriented mineral platelets within the material. These platelets are so numerous that they also influence the material's body colour. In aventurine quartz, chrome-bearing fuchsite produces a green stone, and various iron oxides or metallic copper precipitates produce a red stone.

The words aventurine and aventurescence derive from the Italian "a ventura", meaning "by chance". This is an allusion to the chance discovery of aventurine glass (goldstone) at some point in the 18th century. Goldstone is still manufactured today as an artificial imitation of the later discoveries aventurine quartz and aventurine feldspar (sunstone).

== See also ==
- Adularescence – Milky luster or iridescence originating from below the surface of gemstones
- Labradorescence – Plagioclase feldspar with 50–70% anorthite
- Optical phenomena – Observable events that result from the interaction of light and matter
- Rainbow lattice sunstone – Australian feldspar with geometric inclusions
