= List of gemstones by species =

This is a list of gemstones, organized by species and types.

== Minerals sorted by name ==
There are over 300 types of minerals that have been used as gemstones. Such as:

=== A–B ===
- Actinolite
  - Nephrite (var.)
- Adamite
- Aegirine
- Afghanite
- Agrellite
- Algodonite
- Alunite
- Amblygonite
- Analcime
- Anatase
- Andalusite
  - Chiastolite
- Andesine
- Anglesite
- Anhydrite
- Annabergite
- Anorthite
- Antigorite
  - Bowenite
- Apatite
- Apophyllite
- Aragonite
- Arfvedsonite
- Asbestos
- Astrophyllite
- Atacamite
- Augelite
- Austinite
- Axinite group:
  - Ferroaxinite
  - Magnesioaxinite
  - Manganaxinite
  - Tinzenite
- Azurmalachite
- Azurite
- Baryte
- Bastnaesite
- Bayldonite
- Benitoite
- Beryl subgroup:
  - Aquamarine
    - Maxixe
  - Emerald
    - Trapiche emerald (var.)
  - Goshenite
  - Golden beryl
  - Heliodor
  - Morganite
  - Red beryl (Bixbite)
- Beryllonite
- Beudantite
- Bismutotantalite
- Biotite
- Boleite
- Boracite
- Bornite
- Brazilianite
- Breithauptite
- Brookite
- Brucite
- Bustamite
- Bytownite

=== C–F ===
- Calcite
  - Manganoan calcite (var.)
- Caledonite
- Canasite
- Cancrinite
  - Vishnevite
- Carletonite
- Carnallite
- Cassiterite
- Catapleiite
- Cavansite
- Celestite
- Ceruleite
- Cerussite
- Chabazite
- Chalcopyrite
- Chambersite
- Charlesite
- Charoite
- Childrenite
- Chiolite
- Chondrodite
- Chrysoberyl
  - Alexandrite (var.)
  - Cymophane
- Chromite
- Chrysocolla
- Chrysotile
- Cinnabar
- Clinochlore
- Clinohumite
- Clinozoisite
- Clintonite
- Cobaltite
- Colemanite
- Cordierite
  - Iolite (var.)
- Cornwallite
- Corundum
  - Ruby (var.)
  - Sapphire (var.)
    - Geuda
    - Padparadscha
  - Golden sheen sapphire
- Covellite
- Creedite
- Crocoite
- Cryolite
- Cumberlandite
- Cuprite
- Danburite
- Datolite
- Descloizite
- Diamond
  - Bort
    - Ballas
  - Carbonado
- Diaspore
- Dickinsonite
- Diopside
- Dioptase
- Dolomite
- Dumortierite
- Ekanite
- Elbaite
- Enstatite
  - Bronzite
  - Hypersthene
- Eosphorite
- Epidote
  - Piemontite
- Erythrite
- Esperite
- Ettringite
- Euclase
- Eudialyte
- Euxenite
- Fayalite
- Feldspar
  - Andesine
  - Albite
  - Anorthite
  - Anorthoclase
  - Amazonite
  - Bytownite
  - Celsian
  - Microcline
  - Moonstone
    - Adularia (var.)
    - Rainbow (var.)
  - Orthoclase
    - Unakite
  - Plagioclase
    - Albite
    - Labradorite
    - Oligoclase
  - Sanidine
  - Sunstone
    - Oregon sunstone
    - Rainbow lattice sunstone
- Fergusonite
- Ferroaxinite
- Fluorapatite
- Fluorapophyllite
- Fluorite
- Forsterite
- Friedelite

=== G–L ===
- Gadolinite
- Gahnite
- Gahnospinel
- Garnet group:
  - Pyralspite
    - Almandine
    - Pyrope
    - Spessartine
  - Ugrandite
    - Andradite
      - Demantoid
      - Melanite
      - Topazolite
    - Grossular
      - Hessonite
      - Hydrogrossular
      - Tsavorite
    - Uvarovite
  - Almandine-pyrope
    - Rhodolite
  - Andradite-grossular
    - Grandite (Mali garnet)
  - Pyrope-almandine-spessartine
    - Malaia garnet
  - Pyrope-spessartine
    - Umbalite
- Gaspeite
- Gaylussite
- Geminite
- Gibbsite
- Glaucophane
- Goethite
- Goosecreekite
- Grandidierite
- Gypsum
- Gyrolite
- Halite
- Hambergite
- Hanksite
- Hardystonite
- Hauyne
- Helenite
- Hematite
- Hemimorphite
- Herderite
- Hexagonite
- Hibonite
- Hiddenite
- Hodgkinsonite
- Holtite
- Howlite
- Huebnerite
- Humite
- Hureaulite
- Hurlbutite
- Hyperitdiabas
- Ilmenite
- Inderite
- Jade
  - Jadeite
    - Chloromelanite
  - Nephrite
- Jasper
- Jeremejevite
- Kainite
- Kämmererite
- Kaolinite
- Kornerupine
- Kutnohorite
- Kurnakovite
- Kyanite
- Langbeinite
- Lawsonite
- Lazulite
- Lazurite
- Legrandite
- Lepidolite
- Leucite
- Leucophanite
- Linarite
- Lizardite
- Londonite
- Ludlamite
- Ludwigite

=== M–Q ===
- Magnesite
- Malachite
- Marialite-meionite
  - Wernerite (var.)
- Marcasite
- Meliphanite
- Mellite
- Mesolite
- Microcline
- Microlite
- Milarite
- Millerite
- Mimetite
- Moissanite
- Musgravite
- Nambulite
- Narsarsukite
- Natrolite
- Nepheline
- Neptunite
- Nickeline (Niccolite)
- Nosean
- Nuummite
- Olivine
- Opal
  - Fire opal
  - Moss opal
- Painite
- Palygorskite
- Papagoite
- Pargasite
- Parisite
- Pectolite
  - Larimar
- Pentlandite
- Peridot
- Periclase
- Perthite
- Petalite (castorite)
- Pezzottaite
- Phenakite
- Phlogopite
- Phosgenite
- Phosphophyllite
- Phosphosiderite
- Piemontite
- Pietersite
- Plumbogummite
- Pollucite
- Polyhalite
- Poudretteite
- Powellite
- Prehnite
- Prismatine
- Prosopite
- Proustite
- Psilomelane
- Pumpellyite
  - Chlorastrolite (var.)
- Purpurite
- Pyrite
- Pyrargyrite
- Pyromorphite
- Pyrophyllite
- Pyroxmangite
- Pyrrhotite
- Quartz
  - Amethyst (var.)
  - Ametrine (var.)
  - Aventurine (var.)
  - Chalcedony (var.)
    - Agate
      - Iris agate
      - Onyx
      - Sardonyx
    - Bloodstone (Heliotrope)
    - Carnelian
    - Chrome chalcedony
    - Chrysoprase
    - Dendritic agate
      - Moss agate
    - Fire agate (iridescent var.)
    - Jasper
    - Petrified wood
    - Sard
  - Citrine (var.)
  - Druzy (var.)
  - Flint (var.)
  - Herkimer diamond (var.)
  - Milky quartz (var.)
  - Prasiolite (var.)
  - Radiolarite (var.)
  - Rose quartz (var.)
  - Rock crystal (var.)
  - Shocked quartz (var.)
  - Smoky quartz (var.)
- Quartzite

=== R–Z ===
- Realgar
- Rhodizite
- Rhodochrosite
- Rhodonite
- Richterite
- Riebeckite
  - Crocidolite (var.)
- Rosasite
- Rutile
- Samarskite
- Sanidine
- Sapphirine
- Sarcolite
- Scapolite
  - Marialite
  - Meionite
- Scheelite
- Schizolite
- Scorodite
- Selenite
- Sellaite
- Senarmontite
- Sepiolite (Meerschaum)
- Sérandite
- Seraphinite
- Serendibite
- Serpentine subgroup
  - Antigorite
  - Bowenite
  - Chrysotile
  - Lizardite
  - Stichtite
- Shattuckite
- Shigaite
- Shortite
- Shungite
- Siderite
- Sillimanite
- Simpsonite
- Sinhalite
- Smaltite
- Smithsonite
- Sodalite
  - Hackmanite (var.)
- Sogdianite
- Sperrylite
- Spessartite
- Sphalerite
- Spinel
  - Ceylonite (var.)
- Spodumene
  - Hiddenite (var.)
  - Kunzite (var.)
  - Triphane (var.)
- Spurrite
- Staurolite
- Stibiotantalite
- Stichtite
- Stolzite
- Strontianite
- Strontium titanate
- Sulfur
- Sugilite
  - Bustamite (var.)
  - Richterite (var.)
- Sylvite
- Taaffeite
- Talc
- Tantalite
- Tektites
  - Moldavite
- Tephroite
- Thomsonite
- Thaumasite
- Tinaksite
- Titanite (sphene)
- Topaz
- Tourmaline subgroup:
  - Achroite (var.)
  - Chrome (var.)
  - Dravite
  - Elbaite
  - Fluor-liddicoatite
  - Indicolite
  - Olenite
  - Paraiba (var.)
  - Rossmanite
  - Rubellite (var.)
- Tremolite
  - Hexagonite (var.)
- Triphylite
- Triplite
- Tugtupite
- Turquoise
- Ulexite
- Ussingite
- Vanadinite
- Variscite
- Väyrynenite
- Vesuvianite (idocrase)
  - Californite (var.)
- Villiaumite
- Vivianite
- Vlasovite
- Wardite
- Wavellite
- Weloganite
- Whewellite
- Wilkeite
- Willemite
- Witherite
- Wollastonite
- Wulfenite
- Wurtzite
- Xonotlite
- Yugawaralite
- Zektzerite
- Zeolites
  - Analcime
  - Apophyllite
  - Chabazite
  - Goosecreekite
  - Natrolite
  - Scolecite
  - Stellerite
  - Stilbite
  - Thomsonite
- Zincite
- Zinnwaldite
- Zircon
  - Jacinth (var.)
- Zoisite
  - Tanzanite (var.)
  - Thulite (var.)
- Zultanite
- Zunyite

== Minerals sorted by origin ==
=== Artificial and lab created ===
There are a number of artificial and lab grown minerals used to produce gemstones. These include:

- Lab alexandrite
- Lab corundum
- Cubic zirconia
- Lab diamond
- Lab emerald
- Fordite
- Gadolinium gallium garnet
- Lab moissanite
- Synthetic opal
- Metal-coated crystals hyped as rainbow quartz
- Lab spinel
- Synthetic turquoise
- Terbium gallium garnet
- Trinitite
- Yttrium aluminium garnet
- Yttrium iron garnet

=== Organic ===
There are a number of organic materials used as gems, including:

- Amber
- Ammolite
  - Ammonoidea
- Bone
- Copal
- Coral
- Ivory
- Jet
- Nacre (Mother of pearl)
- Operculum
- Pearl
- Seashell

== Mineral aggregates and other rocks ==
Some rocks are used as gems, including:

- Anthracite
- Anyolite
- Bauxite
- Concretions
- Bloodstone (Heliotrope)
- Eilat stone
- Epidosite
- Glimmerite
- Goldstone (glittering glass)
- Hawk's eye
- Helenite (artificial glass made from volcanic ash)
- Iddingsite
- Kimberlite
- Lamproite
- Lapis lazuli
- Libyan desert glass
- Llanite
- Maw sit sit
- Moldavite
- Obsidian
- Apache tears
- Pallasite
- Peridotite (also known as olivinite)
- Siilinjärvi carbonatite
- Soapstone (also known as steatite)
- Tactite
- Tiger's eye
- Unakite

== Minerals sorted by features ==
=== Chatoyant gems ===
Some minerals made into gemstones may display a chatoyancy or "cat's eye" effect, these include:

- Actinolite
- Andalusite
- Apatite
- Beryl
  - Aquamarine
  - Emerald
  - Heliodor
  - Morganite
- Beryllium
- Beryllonite
- Calcite
- Cerussite
- Chrysoberyl
- Danburite
- Diaspore
- Diopside
- Enstatite
- Garnet
- Grandidierite
- Hawk's eye
- Hypersthene
- Iolite
- Kornerupine
- Kunzite
- Kyanite
- Moonstone
- Opal
- Peridot
- Peristerite (Albite variety)
- Pezzottaite
- Phenakite
- Prasiolite
- Prehnite
- Quartz
- Rhodonite
- Rutile
- Scapolite
- Selenite
- Serpentine
  - Antigorite
  - Bowenite
- Sillimanite
- Smoky Quartz
- Spinel
- Sunstone
- Tanzanite
- Tiger's Eye
- Topaz
- Tourmaline
- Ulexite
- Zircon

=== Asterism ===
Some minerals made into gemstones may display asterism or "star light" effect, usually caused by impurities of rutile and hematite. These include:

- Corundum
  - Ruby
  - Sapphire
- Diopside
- Topaz
- Garnet
- Spinel
- Moonstone
- Rose Quartz

== See also ==
- List of individual gemstones
- List of single-source gemstones
