= Pietersite =

Variety of chalcedony

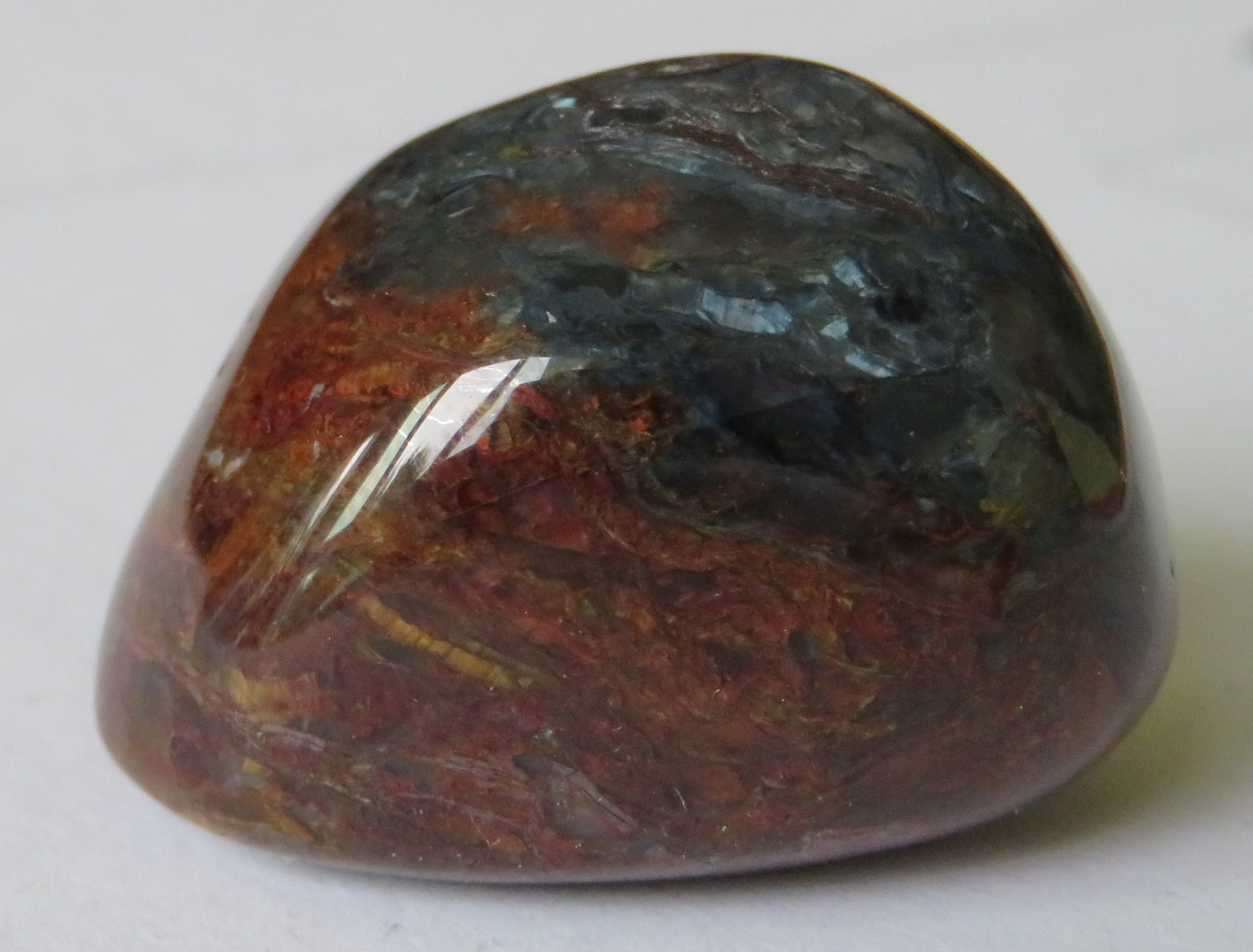
- Polished pietersite

General
- Category: Tectosilicate minerals
- Group: Quartz group
- Formula: SiO_{2}
- IMA status: Variety of quartz (chalcedony)

Identification
- Color: Brown-red, blue-gray, yellow
- Mohs scale hardness: 7

Pietersite is a commercial term for a variety of the mineral chalcedony. Originating from Namibia and China, where it is mined for use as a decorative stone due to its chaotic chatoyancy and brecciated structure.

Ranging in colour from brownish-red, to blue-grey, and chatoyant yellow. The Chinese variety are predominantly a reddish-brown, with regions of chatoyant blue and yellow. The Namibian variety are less varied, being predominantly a chatoyant blue-grey, with less common reddish-browns and yellows.

It was first described in Namibia in 1962 and was discovered in Xichuan - in the Henan Province of China - in 1966.

Pietersite is often inaccurately described as a brecciated form of tiger's-eye or hawk's-eye, due to the brecciated texture containing chatoyant material. However, while they are similar mineralogically, pietersite is not a brecciated form of either. Instead, the chatoyancy is due to a shared mineral, crocidolite.
