= Väyrynenite =

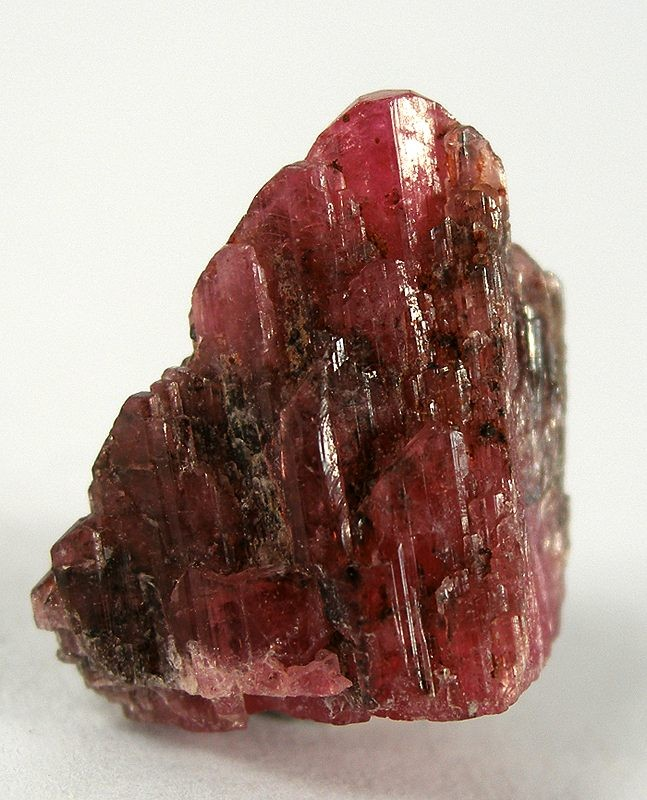
- Väyrynenite (size: 1.7 x 1.4 x 0.6 cm)

General
- Category: Phosphate mineral
- Formula: MnBe(PO_{4})(OH,F)
- IMA symbol: Väy
- Strunz classification: 8.BA.05
- Crystal system: Monoclinic
- Crystal class: Prismatic (2/m) (same H-M symbol)
- Space group: P2_{1}/a
- Unit cell: a = 5.411(5) Å, b = 14.49(2) Å, c = 4.73 Å; β = 102.75°; Z = 4

Identification
- Color: Light pink to rose-red, salmon pink, pale gray, brown
- Crystal habit: Rare as elongated and striated prismatic crystals; fine-grained aggregates
- Cleavage: Perfect on {010}, good on {100}, fair on {001}
- Fracture: Uneven
- Tenacity: Brittle
- Mohs scale hardness: 5
- Luster: Vitreous
- Streak: White
- Diaphaneity: Transparent to translucent
- Specific gravity: 3.22
- Optical properties: Biaxial (–)
- Refractive index: n_{α} = 1.638 - 1.640 n_{β} = 1.658 - 1.662 n_{γ} = 1.664 - 1.667
- Birefringence: δ = 0.026 - 0.027
- Pleochroism: Visible X= orangish, Y= red, Z= dark red
- 2V angle: 46°–55°
- Dispersion: r > v moderate

Väyrynenite is a rare phosphate mineral with formula MnBe(PO_{4})(OH,F). It was first described in 1954 for an occurrence in Viitaniemi, Erajarvi, Finland and named for mineralogist Heikki Allan Väyrynen of Helsinki, Finland.

It occurs in pegmatites as an alteration of beryl and triphylite. It occurs in association with eosphorite, moraesite, hurlbutite, beryllonite, amblygonite, apatite, tourmaline, topaz, muscovite, microcline and quartz.
