= Seraphinite =

Trade name for a form of clinochlore

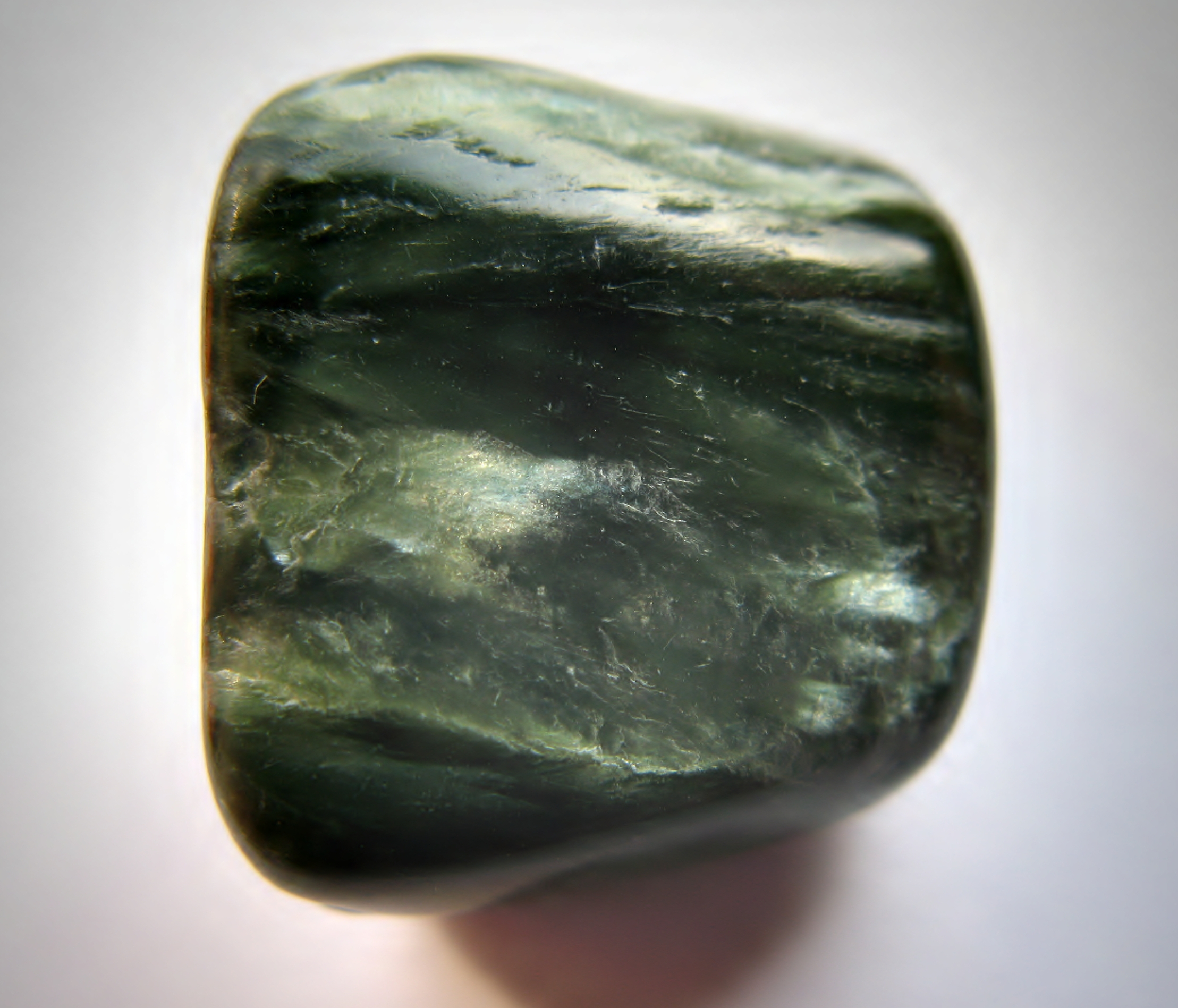
- Seraphinite specimen

General
- Category: Phyllosilicate minerals
- Group: Chlorite group
- Formula: (Mg, Fe^{3+}Al(Si_{3}Al)O_{10}(OH)_{8}
- Crystal system: Monoclinic

Identification
- Color: green, white, colourless
- Mohs scale hardness: 2–2.5
- Luster: Pearly, dull, greasy
- Streak: light green
- Diaphaneity: transparent, translucent to opaque
- Specific gravity: 2.600–3.000
- Optical properties: Biaxial (–)
- Refractive index: 1.571–1.597
- Birefringence: 0.005–0.011
- Ultraviolet fluorescence: inert

Seraphinite is a trade name for a particular form of clinochlore, a member of the chlorite group.

Seraphinite apparently acquired its name due to its resemblance to feathers due to its chatoyancy. Seraphinite is named after the biblical seraphs or seraphim angels. With some specimens the resemblance is quite strong, with shorter down-like feathery growths leading into longer "flight feathers"; the resemblance even spurs fanciful marketing phrases like "silver plume seraphinite." Seraphinite is generally dark green to gray in color, has chatoyancy, and has hardness between 2 and 4 on the Mohs scale of mineral hardness.

Seraphinite is mined in a limited area of eastern Siberia in Russia. Russian mineralogist Nikolay Koksharov (1818-1892 or 1893) is often credited with its discovery. It occurs in the Korshunovskoye iron skarn deposit in the Irkutskaya Oblast of Eastern Siberia.
