= Datolite =

Nesosilicate mineral

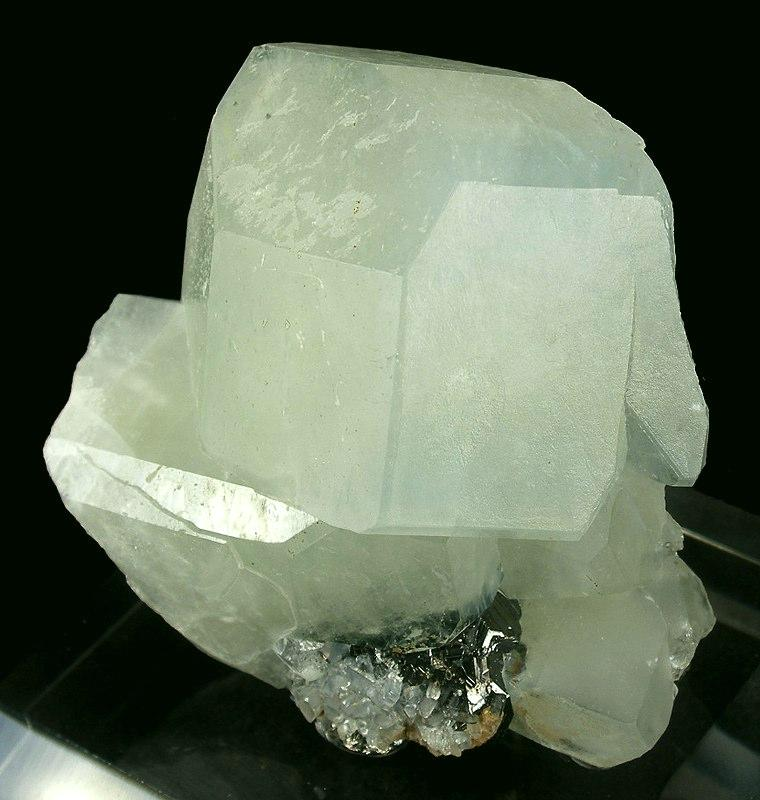
- Datolite on sphalerite from San Luis Potosí, Mexico (size: 6.2 x 5.3 x 2.8 cm)

General
- Category: Nesosilicate
- Formula: CaBSiO_{4}(OH)
- IMA symbol: Dat
- Strunz classification: 9.AJ.20
- Crystal system: Monoclinic
- Crystal class: Prismatic (2/m) (same H-M symbol)
- Space group: P2_{1}/c
- Unit cell: a = 9.62, b = 7.6 c = 4.84 [Å]; β = 90.15°; Z = 4

Identification
- Color: Colorless or white; may be grayish, yellow, green, pale green, red, pink, etc.
- Crystal habit: Crystal prismatic, short to tabular; Botryoidal or globular with columnar structure; granular to compact; cryptocrystalline
- Cleavage: None
- Fracture: Conchoidal to uneven
- Tenacity: Brittle
- Mohs scale hardness: 5 to 5.5
- Luster: Vitreous, rarely subresinous on fracture surface
- Diaphaneity: Transparent to translucent, rarely opaque
- Specific gravity: 2.96 – 3.00
- Optical properties: Biaxial (-)
- Refractive index: n_{α} = 1.626 n_{β} = 1.653 - 1.654 n_{γ} = 1.670
- Birefringence: δ = 0.044
- 2V angle: Measured: 74°
- Dispersion: r > v; weak
- Ultraviolet fluorescence: Fluoresces blue under SW UV

Datolite is a calcium boron hydroxide nesosilicate, CaBSiO_{4}(OH). It was first observed by Jens Esmark in 1806, and named by him from δατεῖσθαι, "to divide," and λίθος, "stone," in allusion to the granular structure of the massive mineral.

Datolite crystallizes in the monoclinic system forming prismatic crystals and nodular masses. The luster is vitreous and may be brown, yellow, light green or colorless. The Mohs hardness is 5.5 and the specific gravity is 2.8 - 3.0.

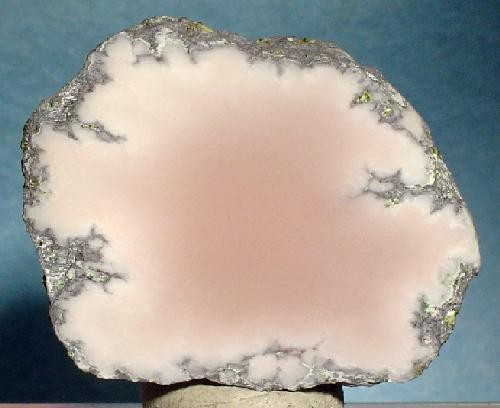
Polished datolite nodule from the Quincy Mine of Michigan’s Copper Country (size: 4.1 x 3.3 x 1.7 cm)

The type localities are in the diabases of the Connecticut River valley and Arendal in Agder county, Norway. Associated minerals include prehnite, danburite, babingtonite, epidote, native copper, calcite, quartz and zeolites. It is common in the copper deposits of the Lake Superior region of Michigan. It occurs as a secondary mineral in mafic igneous rocks often filling vesicles along with zeolites in basalt. Unlike most localities throughout the world, the occurrence of datolite in the Lake Superior region is usually fine grained in texture and possesses colored banding. Much of the coloration is due to the inclusion of copper or associated minerals in progressive stages of hydrothermal precipitation.

Botryolite is a botryoidal form of datolite.
