= Intramodal dispersion =

In fiber-optic communication, an intramodal dispersion, is a category of dispersion that occurs within a single mode optical fiber. This dispersion mechanism is a result of material properties of optical fiber and applies to both single-mode and multi-mode fibers. Two distinct types of intramodal dispersion are: chromatic dispersion and polarization mode dispersion.

== Chromatic dispersion ==
In silica, the index of refraction is dependent upon wavelength. Therefore different wavelengths will travel down an optical fiber at different velocities. This implies that a pulse with a wider FWHM will spread more than a pulse with a narrower FWHM. This dispersion limits both the bandwidth and the distance over which the information can be transmitted. This is why for long communications links, it is desirable to use a laser with a very narrow linewidth. Distributed Feedback Lasers (DFB) are popular for communications because they have a single longitudinal mode with a very narrow line width.

== See also ==
- Dispersion (optics)
