= Hexagonite =

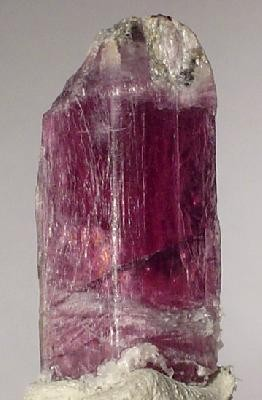

General
- Category: mineral variety of tremolite
- Formula: Ca_{2}Mg_{5} (Si_{8}O_{22}) (OH)_{2}
- Space group: monoclinic – prismatic

Identification
- Color: red to pink, lilac to purple
- Crystal habit: elongated, bladed crystals, granula
- Twinning: simple, multiple
- Cleavage: [110] perfect; [010] distinct
- Fracture: uneven
- Tenacity: brittle
- Mohs scale hardness: 5.0–6.0
- Luster: vitreous
- Refractive index: 1.599–1.637 biaxial ( - )
- Birefringence: 0.019–0.028
- Pleochroism: bluish–red, deep rose, deep red–violet
- Dispersion: weak, r < v

Hexagonite is the red to pink, lilac to purple manganoan variety of tremolite. A rare amphibole, it can be transparent, translucent, and rarely opaque.

== Properties ==
Hexagonite is pleochroic, potentially displaying varying shades of blue, violet, purple, or red. It is also known as "mangan-tremolite", since the manganese imparts the mineral's unique colors. Pink, lilac, and purple are the most common colors. Hexagonite has been successfully faceted.

== Chemical formulae and history ==
Tremolite was discovered in 1789. Hexagonite, a varietal form of tremolite, has a Mohs hardness of 5.0-6.0. Like tremolite, it is a calcium magnesium silicate hydroxide with the formula: Ca_{2}Mg_{5} (Si_{8}O_{22}) (OH)_{2}.

The mineral was given the name, hexagonite, because its crystal structure was believed at one time to be hexagonal. Since then, however, it has been found to be monoclinic.

== Occurrence ==
The mineral is found primarily in the Balmat-Edwards zinc district of Edwards, St. Lawrence County, New York, United States. It was also found in the Czech Republic in the Chýnov caves.
