= Schizolite =

Silicate mineral

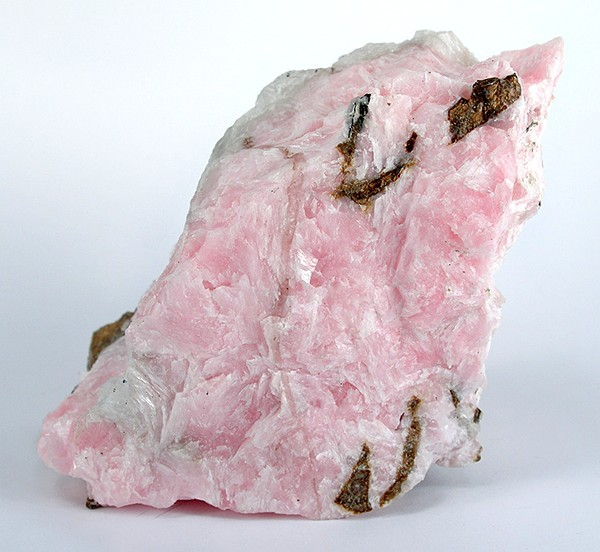
- Schizolite specimen

General
- Category: Minerals
- Formula: NaCaMnSi_{3}O_{8}(OH)
- IMA symbol: Szl
- Crystal system: Triclinic
- Crystal class: Triclinic-Pinacoidal
- Space group: P1̅
- Unit cell: 359.40 Å³

Identification
- Color: Pale red or pink to brownish
- Crystal habit: Bladed
- Cleavage: {100} , {001}
- Fracture: Splintery
- Tenacity: Brittle
- Mohs scale hardness: 5.5
- Luster: Vitreous, sub-Vitreous
- Diaphaneity: Transparent, translucent
- Density: 3.17
- Optical properties: Biaxial (+)
- Refractive index: n_{α} = 1.626(3) n_{β} = 1.630(2) n_{γ} = 1.661(2)
- Birefringence: 0.035
- Pleochroism: Non-pleochroic
- 2V angle: Measured 71° (4), calculated 40°

Schizolite is a mineral with the formula NaCaMnSi_{3}O_{8}(OH) first described in 1901 after discovery in South Greenland by Winther. Its name comes from the Greek word 'σϗιζω' (sϗizo) after its perfect cleavage. It was dropped from the valid species status in 1955 as a variety of pectolite based on Schaller's work. It's a member of the Wollastonite group.

Marshall Sussman, a mineral dealer, sold minerals that were believed to be bustamites from the Wessels mine in 2011. After the third of the stock was sold they realized the specimens might be a new mineral, took it down from the market immediately, and waited for approval. It was approved by the International Mineralogical Association as a mineral in 2013, with the intended name sussmanite. However, it was decided that this name was too similar to another existing gem's name, zussmanite so the name marshallsussmanite was chosen, after the famous mineral dealer Marshall Sussman. It is believed to be a pectolite variant which contains manganese in place of calcium. The name was reverted to Schizolite in 2018.

== See also ==
- Pectolite
