= Hambergite =

Beryllium borate mineral

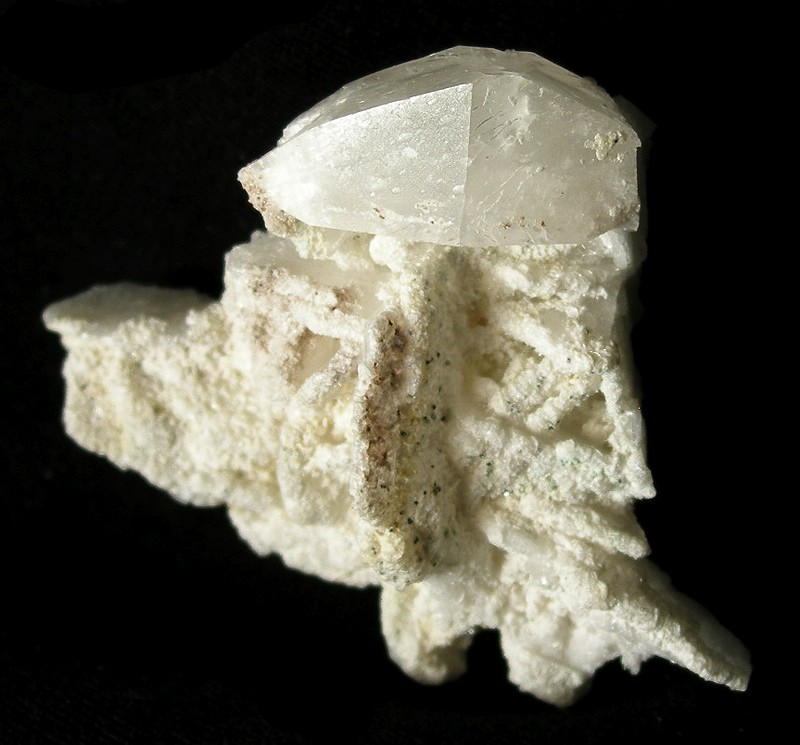
- 2.3 × 1.1 × 1 cm crystal of hambergite on albite from Paprok, Nuristan Province, Afghanistan

General
- Category: Borate mineral
- Formula: Be_{2}BO_{3}OH
- IMA symbol: Hb
- Strunz classification: 6.AB.05
- Crystal system: Orthorhombic
- Crystal class: Dipyramidal (mmm); H-M symbol: (2/m 2/m 2/m)
- Space group: Pbca
- Unit cell: a = 9.76, b = 12.20 c = 4.43 [Å]; Z = 8

Identification
- Color: Colorless, pale gray, pale yellow
- Crystal habit: Prismatic crystals
- Twinning: On {110}
- Cleavage: Perfect on {010}, good on {100}
- Tenacity: Brittle
- Mohs scale hardness: 7.5
- Luster: Vitreous
- Streak: White
- Diaphaneity: Transparent to translucent
- Specific gravity: 2.347–2.372
- Optical properties: Biaxial (+)
- Refractive index: n_{α} = 1.554 – 1.560 n_{β} = 1.587 – 1.591 n_{γ} = 1.628 – 1.631
- Birefringence: δ = 0.074
- Pleochroism: Colorless
- 2V angle: 87°
- Solubility: Soluble in HF (Hydrogen fluoride)

Hambergite (Be_{2}BO_{3}OH) is a beryllium borate mineral named after Swedish explorer and mineralogist Axel Hamberg (1863–1933). The mineral occurs as white or colorless orthorhombic crystals.

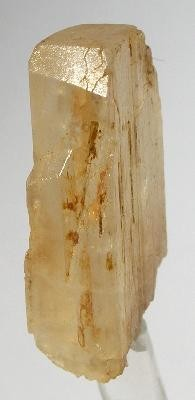
Tabular, terminated crystal from the Gem Hill, Mesa Grande District, San Diego County, California (size: 1.5 × .8 × .5 cm)

== Occurrence ==
Hambergite occurs in beryllium bearing granite pegmatites as a rare accessory phase. It occurs associated with beryl, danburite, apatite, spodumene, zircon, fluorite, feldspar and quartz.

It was first described by mineralogist and geographer W. C. Brøgger in 1890. The type locality is Salbutangen, Helgeroa, Langesundsfjorden, Larvik, Vestfold, Norway where it was found in a pegmatite dike of nepheline syenite composition.

== Bibliography ==
- Palache, P.; Berman H.; Frondel, C. (1960). "Dana's System of Mineralogy, Volume II: Halides, Nitrates, Borates, Carbonates, Sulfates, Phosphates, Arsenates, Tungstates, Molybdates, Etc. (Seventh Edition)" John Wiley and Sons, Inc., New York, pp. 370–372.
- G. Diego Gatta; Garry J. McIntyre; Geoffrey Bromiley; Alessandro Guastoni; Fabrizio Nestola American Mineralogist (2012) 97 (11–12): 1891–1897. https://doi.org/10.2138/am.2012.4232
