= Sarcolite =

Silicate mineral

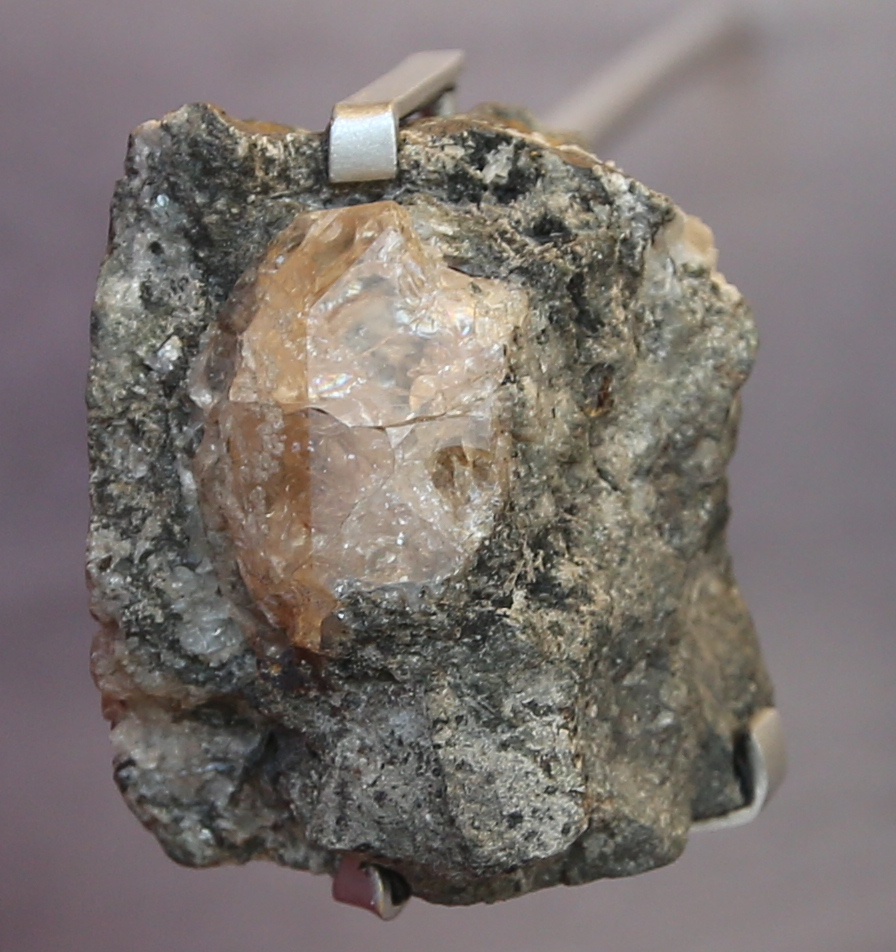

General
- Category: Minerals
- Formula: Na_{4}Ca_{12}Al_{8}Si_{12}O_{46}(SiO_{4},PO_{4})(OH,H_{2}O)_{4}(CO_{3},Cl)
- IMA symbol: Sco
- Strunz classification: 9.EH.15
- Dana classification: 76.3.2.1
- Crystal system: Tetragonal
- Crystal class: Dipyramidal; H-M Symbol: 4/m
- Space group: I4/m
- Unit cell: 2,355.78

Identification
- Color: Flesh-pink, flesh-red, red, reddish white, colourless
- Cleavage: None
- Fracture: Conchoidal
- Tenacity: Brittle
- Mohs scale hardness: 6
- Luster: Vitreous
- Streak: White
- Diaphaneity: Translucent
- Specific gravity: 2.91 - 2.96
- Density: 2.91 - 2.96
- Optical properties: Uniaxial (+)
- Refractive index: n_{ω} = 1.604(1) n_{ε} = 1.615(3)
- Birefringence: 0.011
- Solubility: HF, HCl
- Common impurities: Ti, Fe, Mn, Mg, Sr, K, Cl, P, S

Sarcolite is a mineral named due to its color. Its name originates from the Greek word sárx (σάρξ), meaning flesh and from the Greek word for stone, líthos (λίθος), for being a mineral. It was first described in 1959, but had been a valid species since 1807. It is grandfathered, meaning the name sarcolite still refers to a valid species till this day. Researchers were able to create lab-grown sarcolites with the same crystal structure and formula, although the lab grown ones show different, uniaxial (-) optical properties.

== Properties ==
Sarcolite grows equant pseudocubic fine hemihedral crystals up to 2.5 cm in irregular masses that are well-formed. It mainly consists of oxygen (40.72%), calcium (25.50%) and silicon (17.87%), but otherwise contains aluminum (11.45%), sodium (2.44%) and fluorine (2.01%). It does not show radioactive properties whatsoever. It is soluble in hydrogen fluoride and in hydrogen chloride. It used to be considered to be a flesh-colored analcime variety due to the distinct pseudocubic habit it has. In 1824 however, thanks to Brooke it turned out that the mineral is tetragonal and dipyramidal. After morphological and crystallographic studies, it became clear that sarcolite is a different species. The classification was a struggle as well. It was considered a feldspathoid at first, then it got placed to the melilite group. In the end, it was placed in the scapolite group due to the chemical resemblance of the marialite-meionite series.

== Environment and usage ==
Sarcolite can appear in contact metamorphosed limestone-bearing volcanic ejecta. That is the reason why it is the type locality of the volcanic rocks of Monte Somma. There are American providers of this mineral, these are in Connecticut and Nevada. The most common impurities include sulfur, titanium, magnesium, manganese, iron, potassium, phosphorus, chlorine and strontium. It is associated with garnet, augite and gehlenite in Monte Somma, and with augite, fluorite and haüyne in Anguillara Sabazia. The faceted stones are up to 2 carats, but can also weigh less than a carat. Due to its tenacity, sarcolite is not commonly worn as a jewelry stone.

== Controversies ==
There are controversial studies surrounding this mineral. Many reference works claim Thomson to be the discoverer of sarcolite, but there are two controversial statements regarding the subject. First one being, that the name Thomson is usually misspelled, and written as Thompson. Allegedly, Thomson is the correct way of spelling, as there's evidence to it from his books that he had signed, and from his will. The second being is that Thomson died in 1806, and no paper by him was found in 1807, and no one quoted the actual publication. Sarcolite was originally described by Vauquelin, who used the name Tompson, whereas Haüy refers to "M. Thomson", allegedly correctly. It was established that Vauquelin's material mentioned on the paper wasn't sarcolite however, but in fact gmelinite, which also grows in lavas. Dana spells it correctly, however in the fifth edition it is spelled Thompson, due to Faujas-Saint-Fond's letter to Naples mentioning Thomson's death. Vauquelin's spelling doesn't seem to be repeated however.
