= Azurmalachite =

Azurmalachite is a mixture of azurite and malachite. It is alternatively called azuromalachite, azurite-malachite and malachite-azurite.

Azurmalachite has a distinctive mottled green and blue coloration. It is relatively rare but can sometimes be found above copper deposits. The main sources for mined azurmalachite are the United States, France, and Namibia.
