= Unakite =

Multicoloured metamorphic rock

Unakite Epidotized granite
- Metamorphic rock
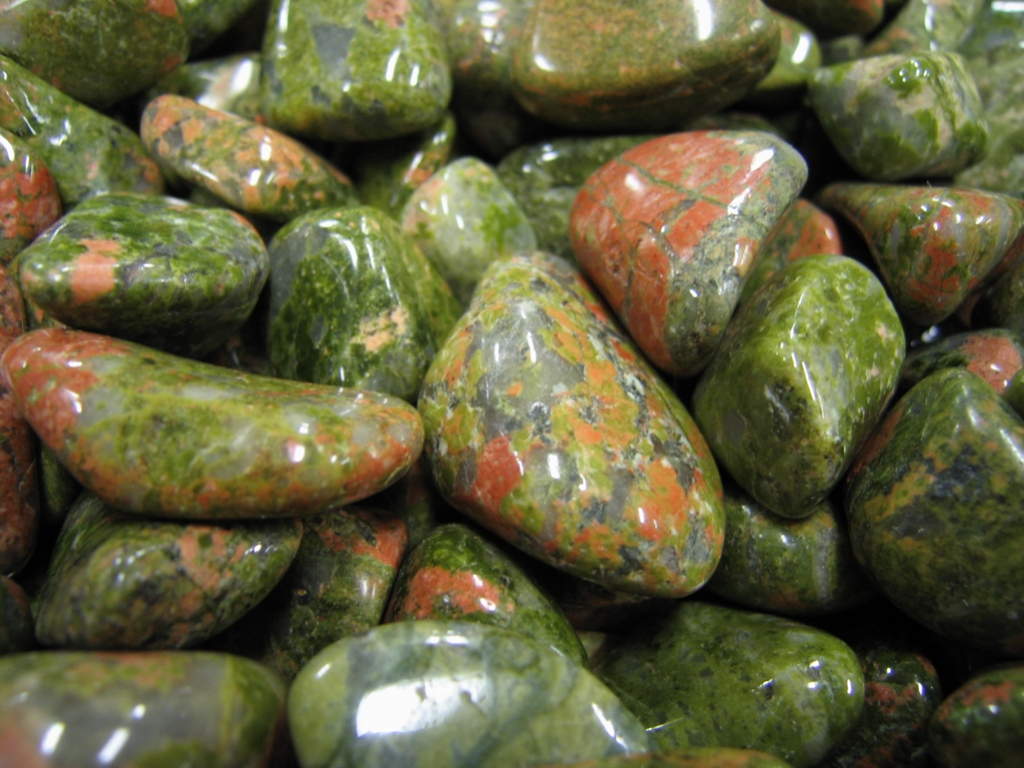
- Tumble polished unakite pebbles

Composition
- Orthoclase feldspar, epidote, quartz

Physical Characteristics
- Fabric: Mottled

Relationships
- Protoliths: Granitoids and charnockite

Unakite is a coarse-grained metamorphic rock that is an altered granitoid composed of orthoclase feldspar (pink), epidote (yellow-green), and quartz (smokey or colorless). Albite-oligoclase plagioclase (white) may or may not be also present.

Bradley first defined and described Unakite in 1874. He named it for Unaka Range of the Great Smoky Mountains of western North Carolina and Eastern Tennessee. He collected his samples primarily from "The Bluff", "Walnut Mountain", and "Max's Patch" in Cocke County, Tennessee.

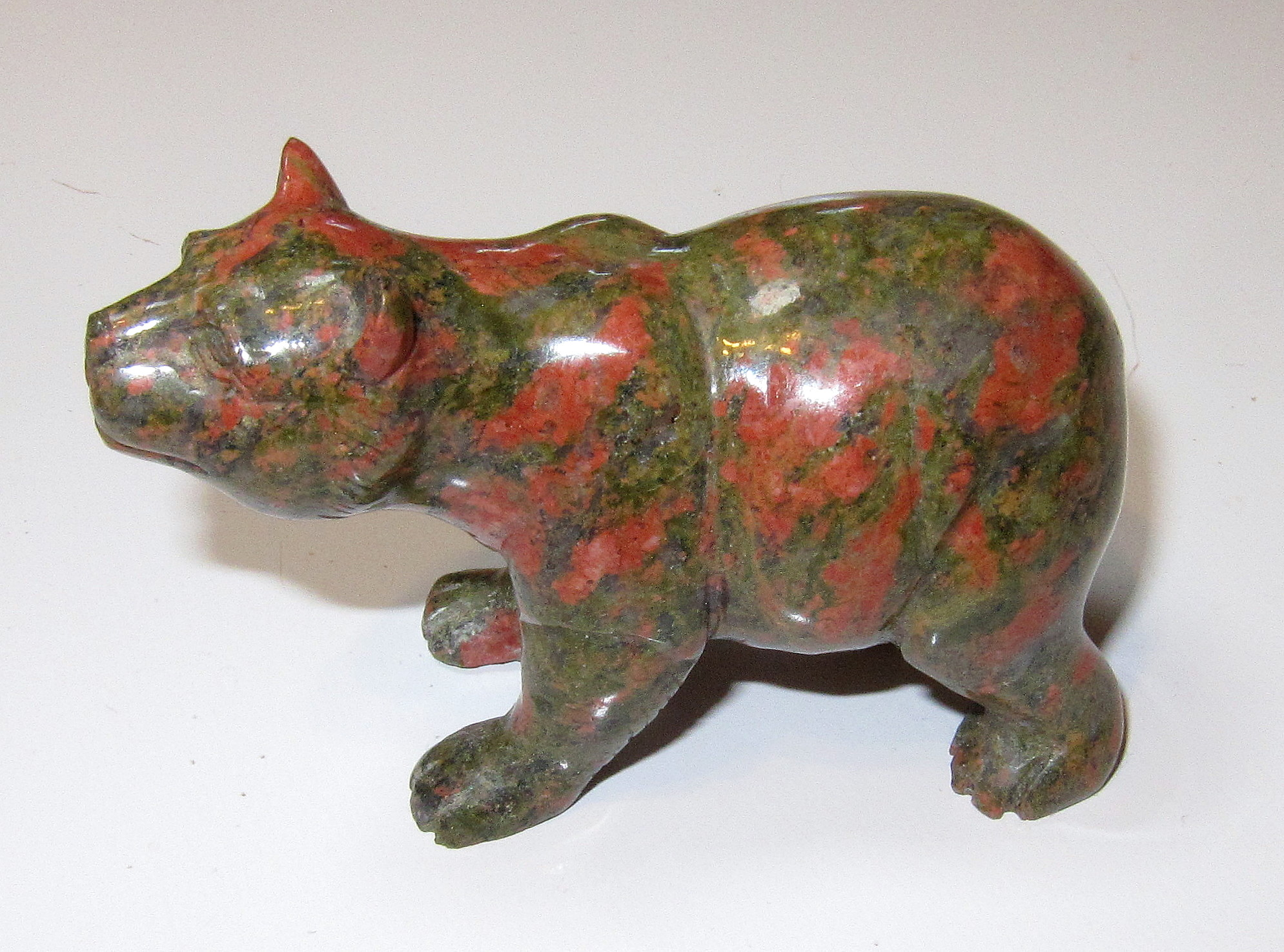
Bear carved from unakite. Length 8 cm.

== Origin ==
Generally, unakite is interpreted to be a metamorphic rock created by the hydrothermal alteration of either granite, granodiorite, or charnockite. It is argued that the epidote in unakite was created by the alteration of either mafic minerals; biotite and feldspar; or some combination of these minerals by hydrothermal fluids. It is also possible that some of the epidote is the result of direct precipitation from hydrothermal fluids.

Most commonly, unakite occurs as comparatively small and restricted bodies in granite and granodiorite. Typically, these bodies are not larger than 15 m (49 ft) in any dimension. In these granitoids, unakite also occurs as veins, dike-like bodies, lenses, irregular masses, or combinations of these.

Locally in Shenandoah National Park, hydrothermal alteration has converted charnockites of the Catoctin Formation to unakite, characterized by green epidote, pink feldspar and blue quartz. Where the lava flows of the Neoproterozoic Catoctin Formation directly overlie it, the dark-greenish-gray charnockite is typically bleached light gray due to the recrystallization of its plagioclase and alkali feldspar. Along joints, the migration of hydrothermal fluid induced by heat from the overlying lava has altered the charnockites to unakite. Overall, unakite in Blue Ridge region is associated with either Neoproterozoic extrusion of lavas of the overlying Catoctin Formation; enhanced fluid flow associated with fault zones; or local effects of regional Paleozoic metamorphism.

== Distribution ==
The distribution of unakite is not precisely known. In part, this lack of knowledge it is due to inconsistencies in how unakite is defined and inconsistent classification of it under other names. It occurs in at least 30 locations in the United States including a few places west of the Mississippi River. Still, the majority of finest unakite is largely restricted to the Blue Ridge region of North Carolina and Virginia with lessor quality unakite found in westernmost Tennessee.

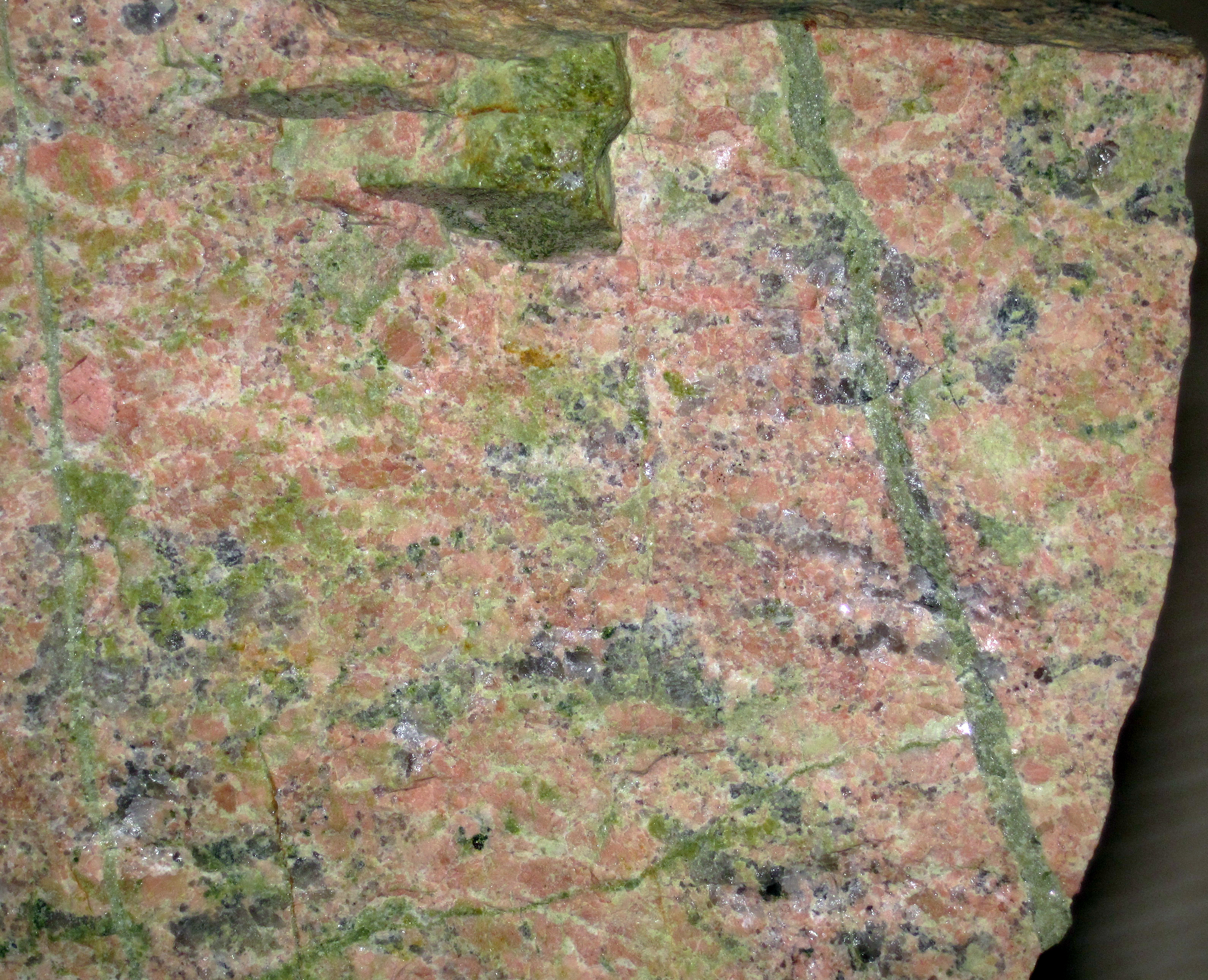
Unakite from near Buena Vista, Virginia

Although found exposed in roadcuts, crush stone pits, and other excavation in the Blue Ridge region, high quality unakite is also found in the stream beds as rolled, well-rounded stones as in the Rose River, northwest of Syria, in Madison County, Virginia. The stones have a rusty surface experience and vary in size from cobbles to boulders.

When collecting in the Blue Ridge region, it must be remembered that unakite occurs in national and state parks in which, of course, rock collecting is prohibited by law. Rock hunting is permitted in national forests, except in certain designated areas. Outside of the parks, the state and national forests, the land is all privately owned, and land owner permission is required for collecting, even if the land is rugged and mountainous and seemingly deserted.

Elsewhere in the United States, the occurrence of unakite has been reported. Within the eastern United States, unakite has been reported from Passic County, New Jersey and Marblehead Neck, Massachusetts. In the Midwest, unakite of unknown quality has also been reported from the Waupaca adamellite from Waupaca County, Wisconsin. Finally, in the western United States, unakite has also been reported from Teller County, Colorado and Bernalillo County, New Mexico.

Unakite has also been reported and listed as having been found at locations outside of North America. For example, Wahl reports the occurrence of unakite within northeastern Finland at about 30 to 40 locations. These unakites are often associated with hypersthene granites. Unakite is listed by Manutchehr-Danai, without any accompanying documentation, as having been found in Zimbabwe, Ireland, and South Africa.

== Use ==
A good quality unakite is considered a semiprecious stone; it will take a good polish and is often used in jewelry as beads or cabochons and other lapidary work such as eggs, spheres and animal carvings.

== See also ==
- Unakite Thirteen Hotel
