= Tiger's eye =

Chatoyant gemstone from the quartz family

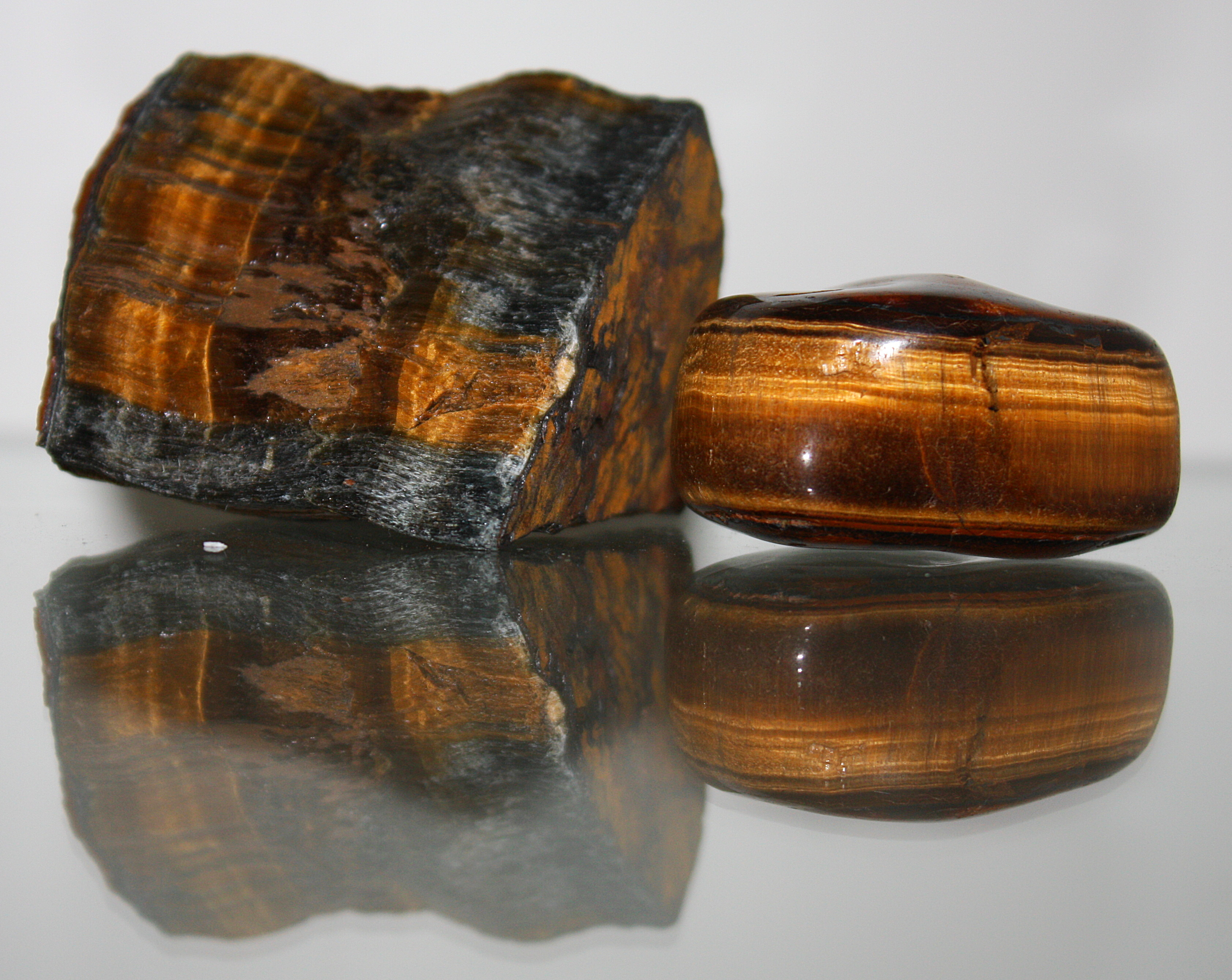

General
- Category: Minerals
- Formula: Silica (SiO_{2})

Identification
- Colour: golden to red-brown
- Mohs scale hardness: 6.5–7
- Luster: Silky
- Specific gravity: 2.64–2.71

Tiger's eye (also called tiger eye) is a chatoyant gemstone that is usually a metamorphic rock with a golden to red-brown colour and a silky lustre. As members of the quartz group, tiger's eye and the related blue-coloured mineral hawk's eye gain their silky, lustrous appearance from the parallel intergrowth of quartz crystals and altered amphibole fibres that have mostly turned into limonite.

== Other forms of tiger's eye ==
Tiger iron is an altered rock composed chiefly of tiger's eye, red jasper and black hematite. The undulating, contrasting bands of colour and lustre make for an attractive motif and it is mainly used for jewellery-making and ornamentation. Tiger iron is a popular ornamental material used in a variety of applications, from beads to knife hilts.

Tiger iron is mined primarily in South Africa and Western Australia. Tiger's eye is composed chiefly of silicon dioxide (SiO_{2}) and is coloured mainly by iron oxide. The specific gravity ranges from 2.64 to 2.71. It is formed by the alteration of crocidolite.

Serpentine deposits in the US states of Arizona and California can have chatoyant bands of chrysotile, a form of asbestos, fibres. These have been cut and sold as "Arizona tiger-eye" and "California tiger's eye" gemstones. The trade name 'pietersite' is used for a fractured or brecciated chalcedony containing amphibole fibers and promoted as tiger's eye from Namibia and China.

== Sources ==
Common sources of tiger's eye include Australia, India, Myanmar, Namibia, South Africa, the United States, Brazil, Canada, China, Korea and Spain.

== Cultural associations ==
In some parts of the world, the stone is believed to ward off the evil eye.

Roman soldiers wore engraved tigers eye to protect them in battle.

== Cut, treatment and imitation ==
Gems are usually given a cabochon cut to best display their chatoyance. Red stones are developed by gentle heat treatments. Dark stones are artificially lightened to improve colour using a nitric acid treatment.

Honey-coloured stones have been used to imitate the more valued cat's eye chrysoberyl, cymophane, but the overall effect is often unconvincing. Artificial fibre optic glass is a common imitation of tiger's eye, and is produced in a wide range of colours.

== Potential hazards ==
Since 1873, Tiger's eye was thought to be harmless. It was thought that pseudomorphism, meaning that quartz had completely transformed the crocidolite fiber into quartz, leaving no asbestos fibers behind.

In 2003, a new study was performed on the mineralogy of Tiger's Eye. Peter Heaney and Donald Fisher from the Department of Geosciences, at Penn State University. In their study, they discovered that quartz did not fully replace crocidolite. Instead, Tiger's Eye is formed by crack seal crystallization. This involves the crocidolite fibers being fractured continuously on a micro-scale. Later hydrothermal liquids seal the crocidolite fibers in quartz. This means the original crocidolite fibers still exist incased by quartz. Although Tiger's Eye is generally considered safe, the new study shows that grinding, or cutting Tiger's Eye could release small amounts of crocidolite into the air.

== Gallery ==
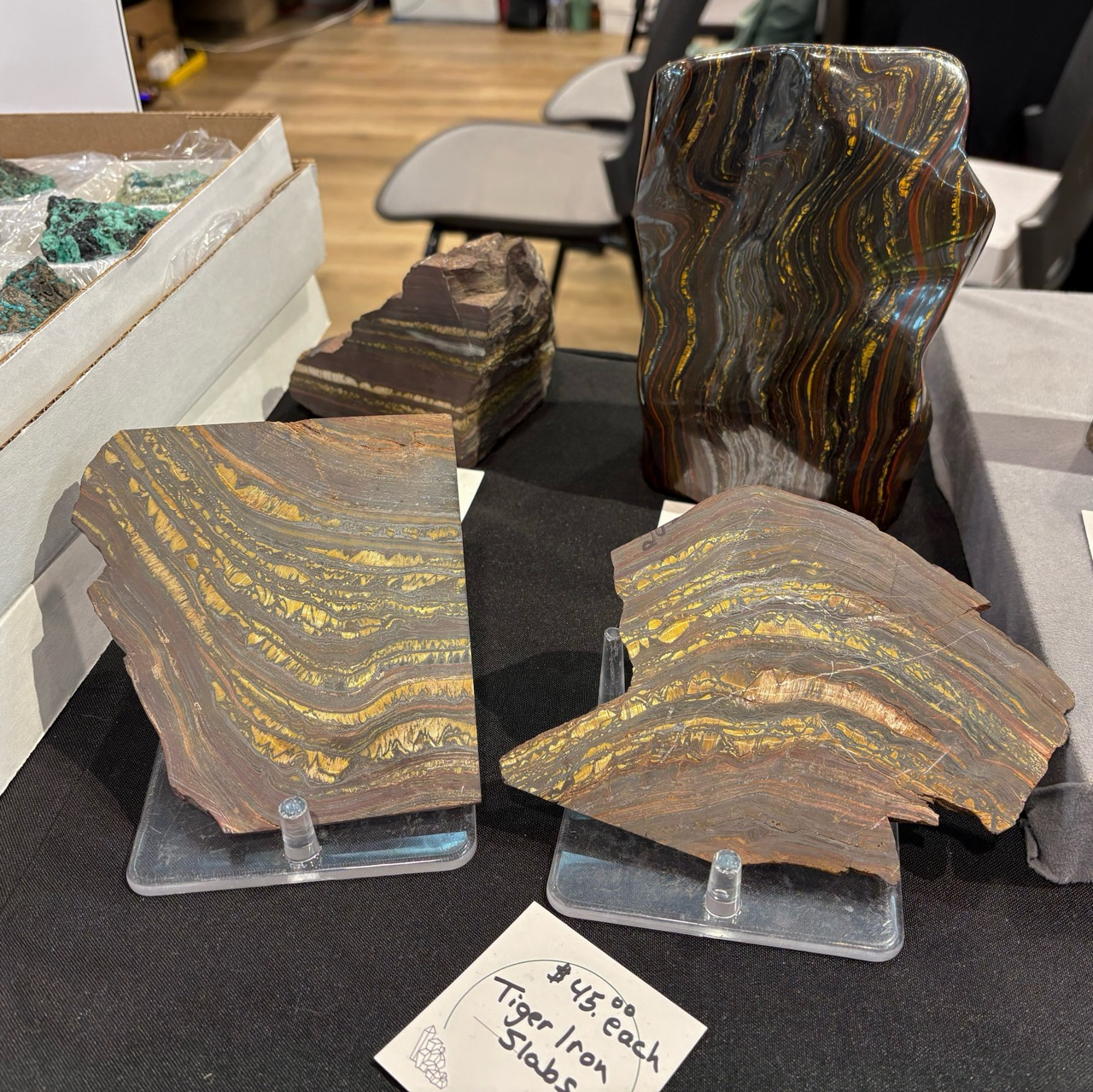
Cut tiger iron slabs at a rock and mineral show. Polished carving in background.

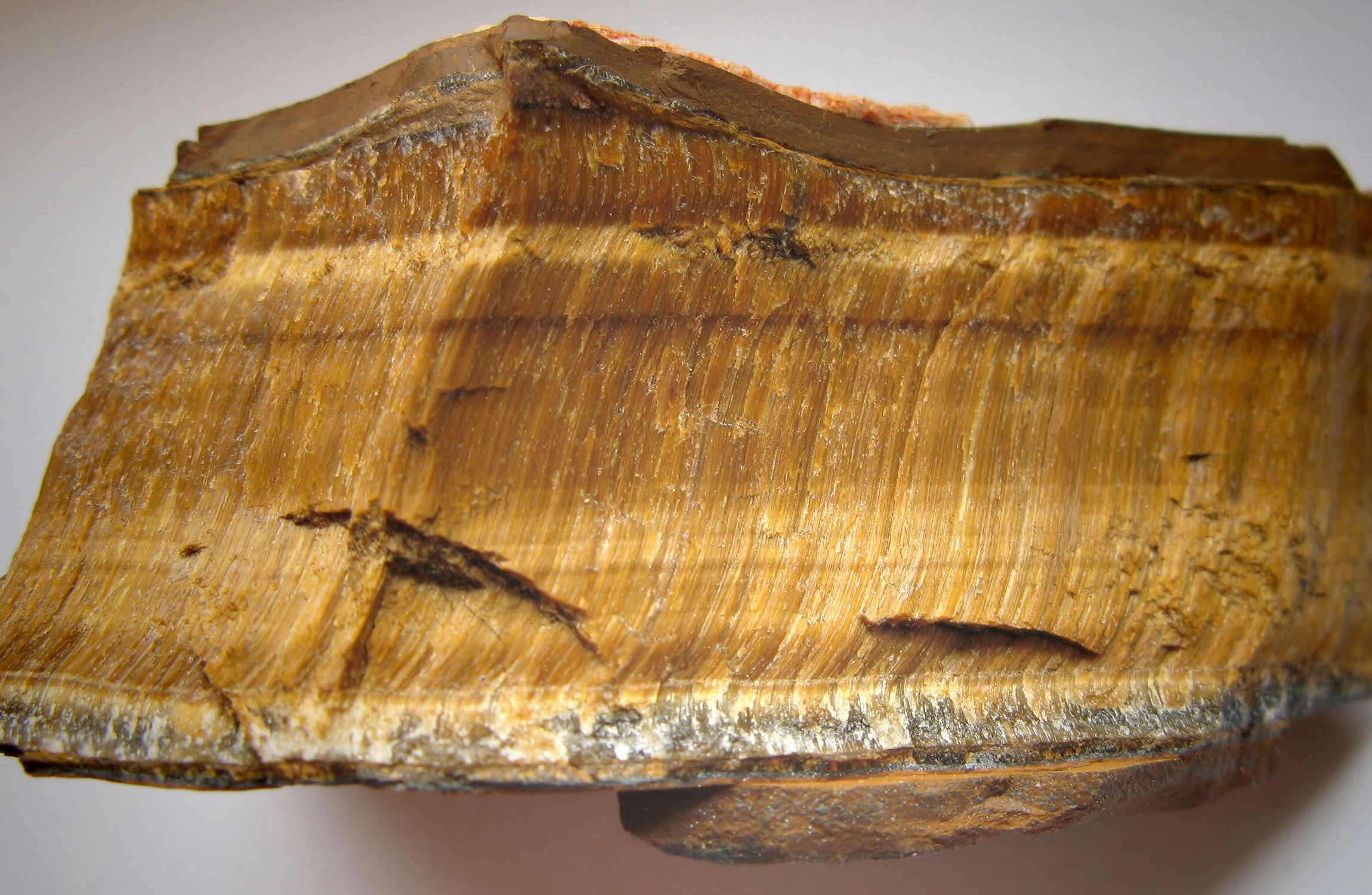
Unpolished tiger's eye from South Africa

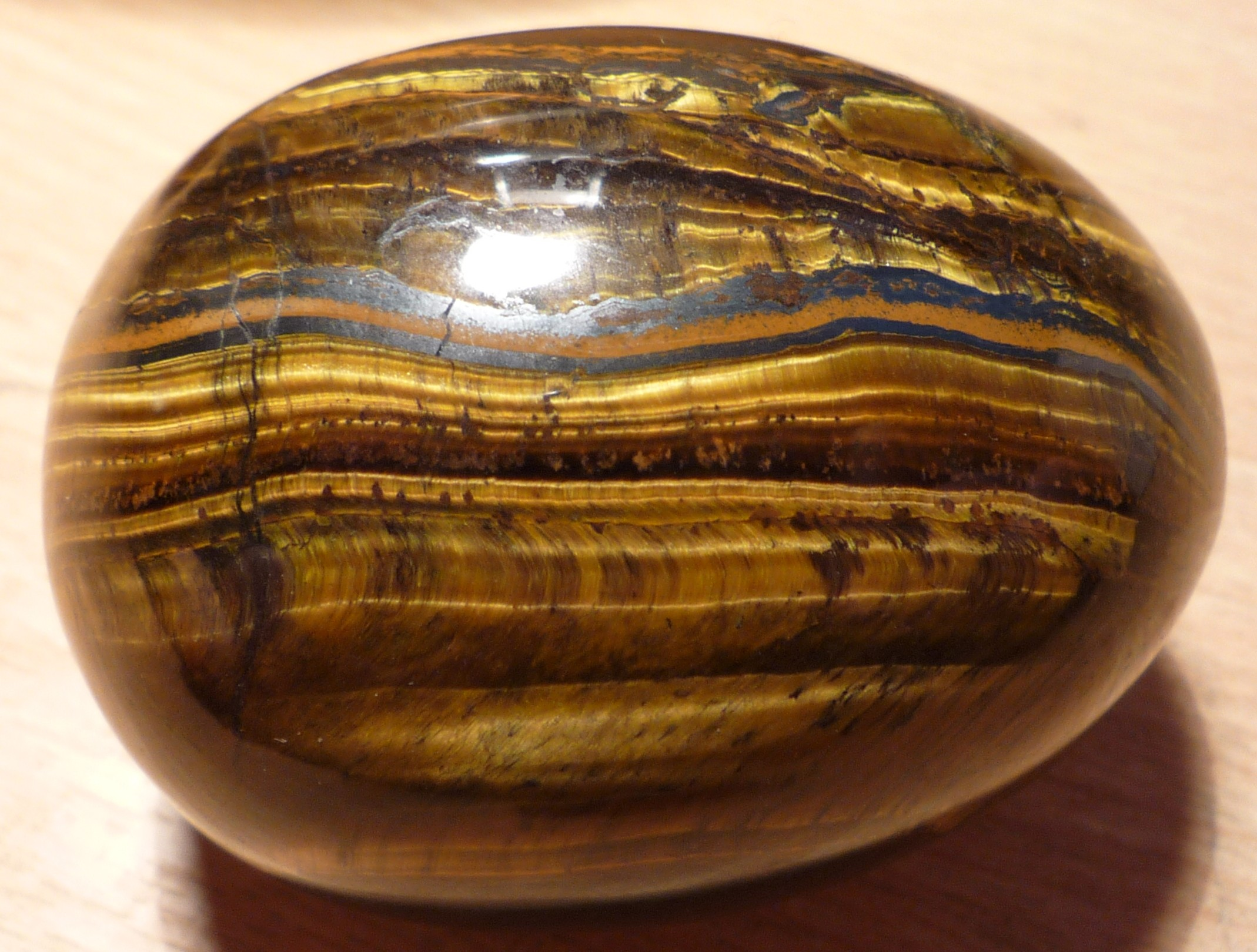
Oval shape tiger's eye with iron stripes

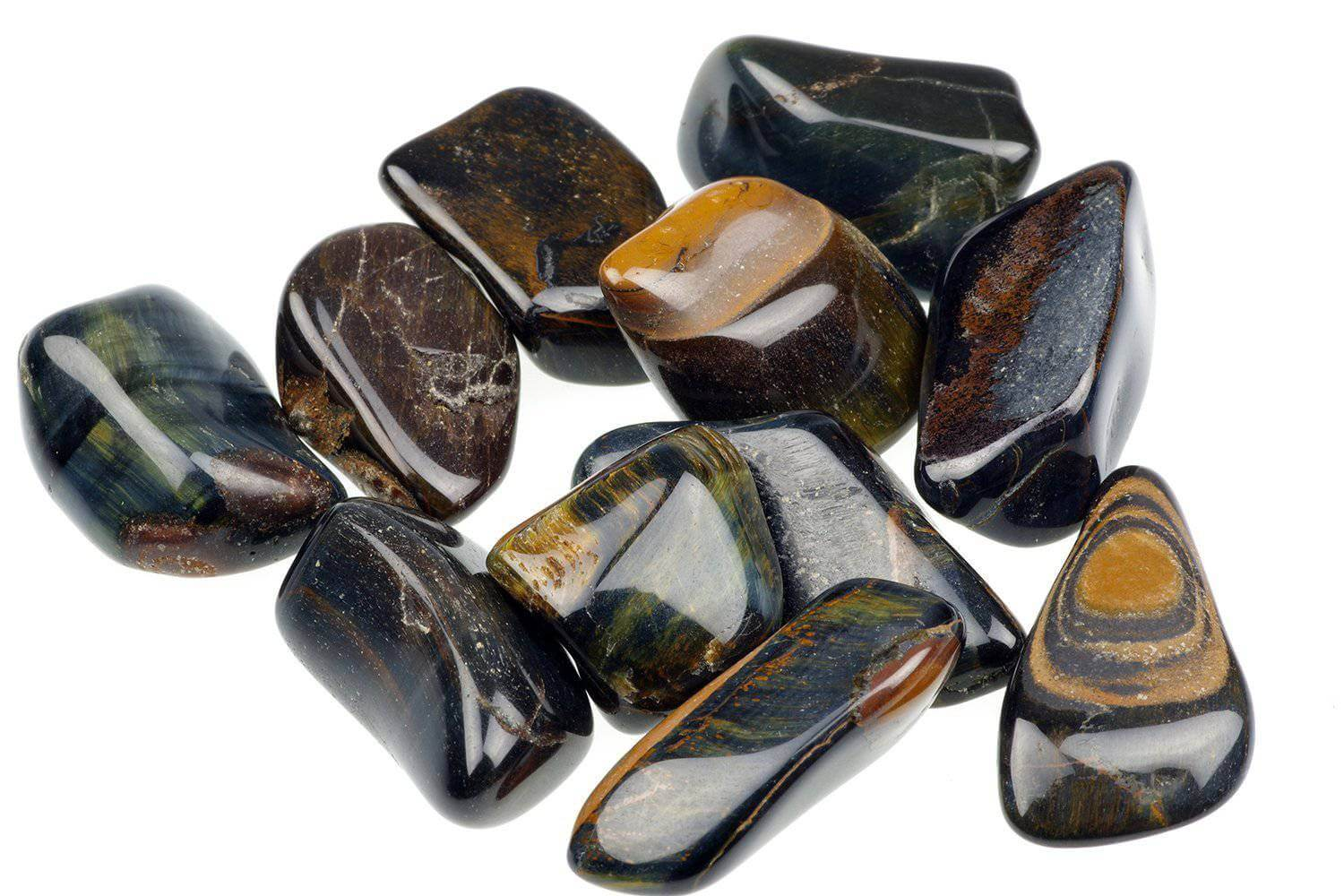
Blue tiger's eye

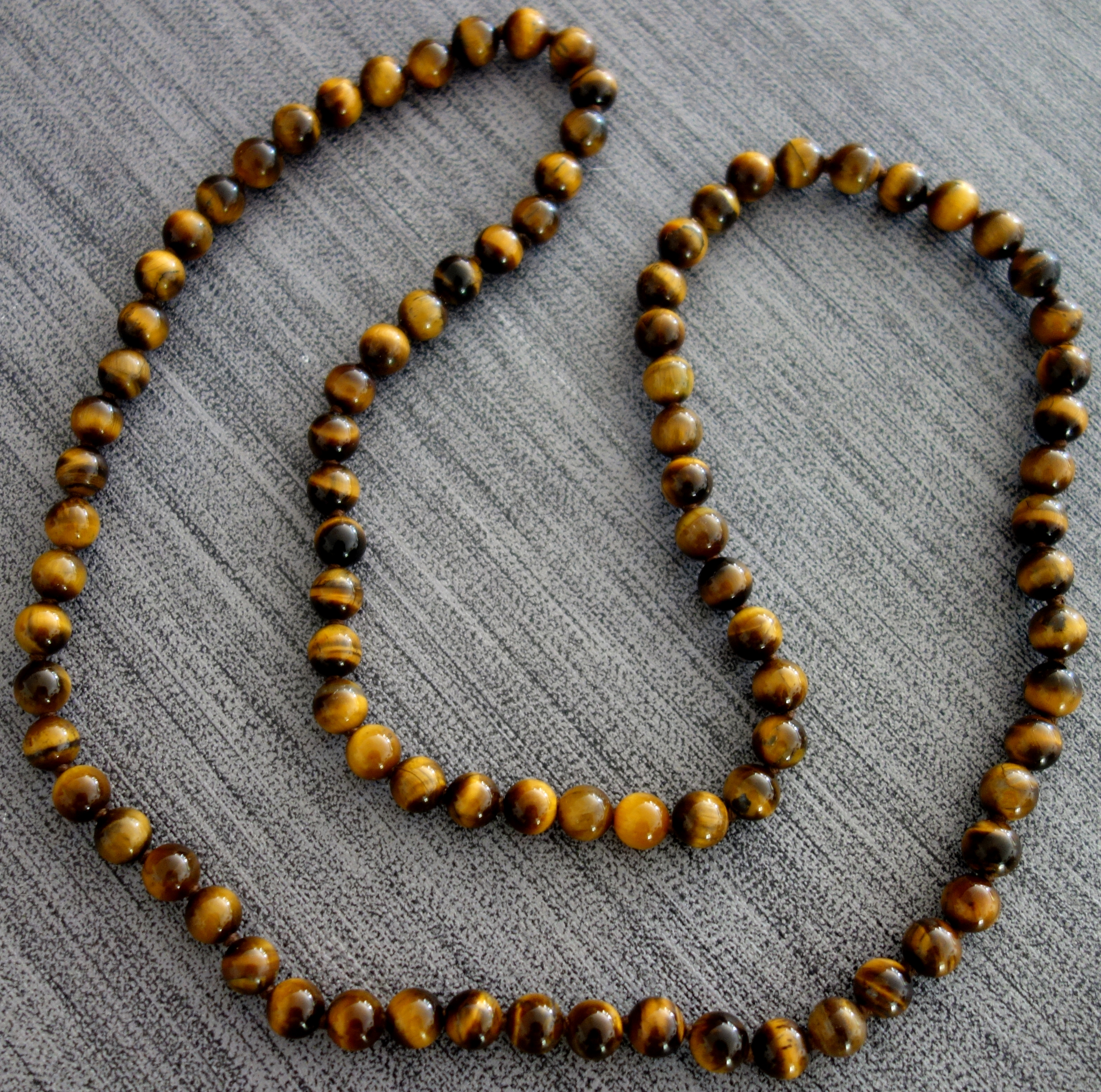
Tiger's eye necklace
