= Danburite =

Tectosilicate mineral

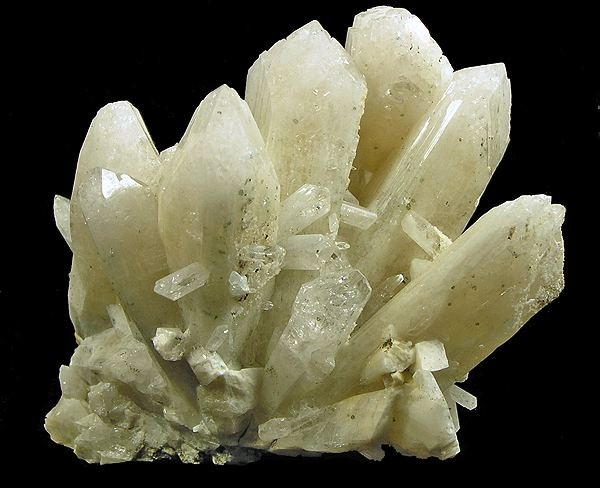
- Cluster of creamy crystals of danburite

General
- Category: Tectosilicate minerals
- Formula: CaB_{2}(SiO_{4})_{2}
- IMA symbol: Dbu
- IMA status: Grandfathered (1839)
- Strunz classification: 9.FA.65
- Dana classification: 56.3.1.1
- Crystal system: Orthorhombic
- Crystal class: Rhombic dipyramidal (mmm)
- Space group: Pnam (no. 62)
- Unit cell: a = 8.038(3), b = 8.752(5) c = 7.73 [Å]; Z = 4

Identification
- Colour: Colourless, white, gray, brownish white, straw yellow
- Crystal habit: Euhedral prismatic crystals; disseminated masses
- Cleavage: {001} Poor
- Fracture: Subconchoidal to uneven
- Tenacity: Brittle
- Mohs scale hardness: 7 – 7.5
- Lustre: Vitreous to greasy
- Streak: White
- Diaphaneity: Transparent to translucent
- Specific gravity: 2.93 – 3.02
- Optical properties: Biaxial (+/-)
- Refractive index: n_{α} = 1.627 – 1.633 n_{β} = 1.630 – 1.636 n_{γ} = 1.633 – 1.639
- Birefringence: δ = 0.006
- 2V angle: 88 to 90° measured
- Dispersion: r < v strong
- Ultraviolet fluorescence: Fluorescent and thermoluminescent (red); Short UV=violet blue; Long UV=blue to blue-green

Danburite is a calcium boron silicate mineral with a chemical formula of CaB_{2}(SiO_{4})_{2}.

It has a Mohs hardness of 7 to 7.5 and a specific gravity of 3.0. The mineral has an orthorhombic crystal form. It is usually colourless, like quartz, but can also be either a cheese-like pale yellow or yellowish-brown. It typically occurs in contact metamorphic rocks.

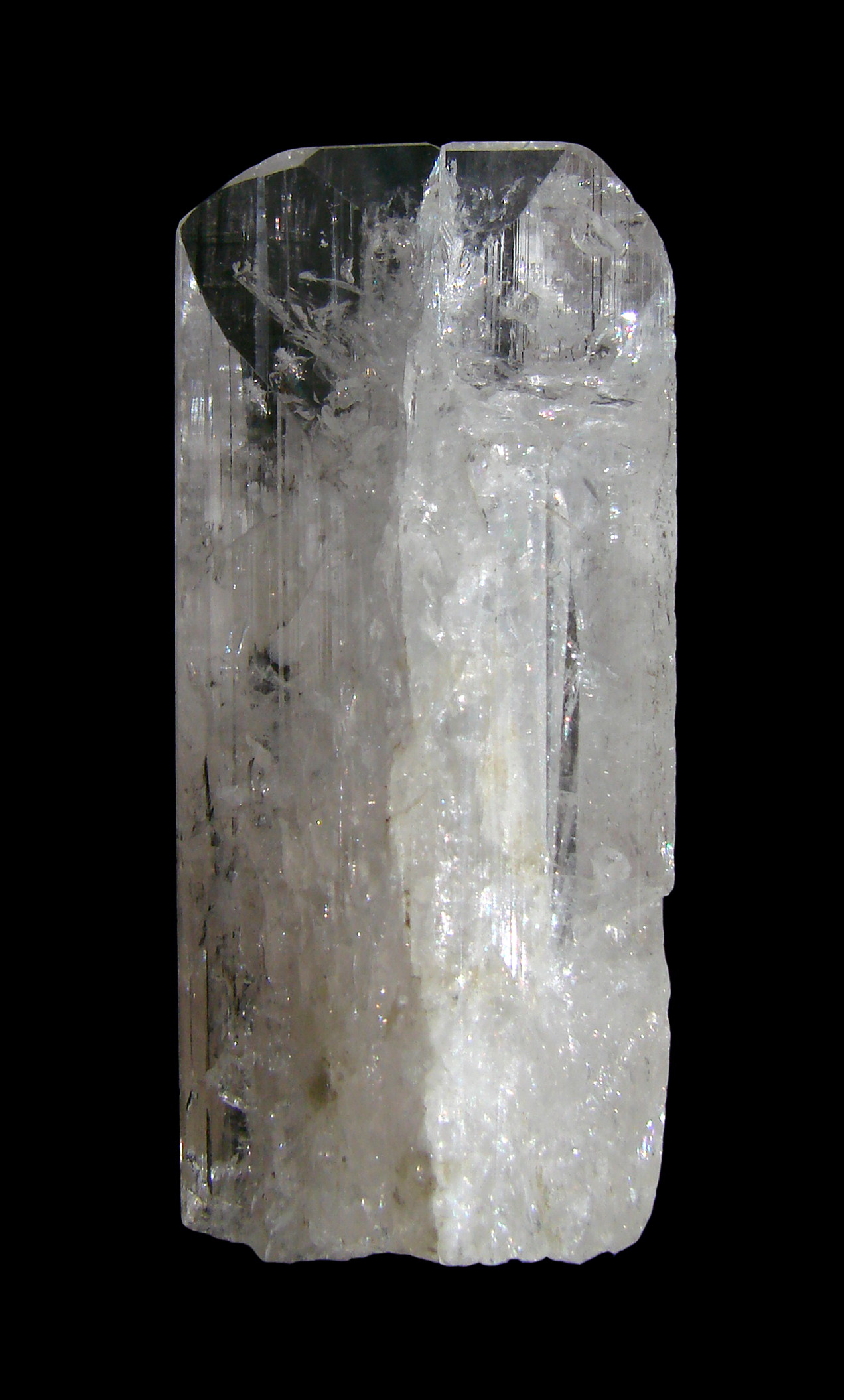
Danburite from Mexico, ≈ 4 cm in height

The Dana classification of minerals categorizes danburite as a sorosilicate, while the Strunz classification scheme lists it as a tectosilicate; its structure can be interpreted as either.

Its crystal symmetry and form are similar to topaz; however, topaz is an aluminum fluorine bearing nesosilicate. The clarity, resilience, and strong dispersion of danburite make it valuable as cut stones for jewelry.

It is named for Danbury, Connecticut, United States, where it was first discovered in 1839 by Charles Upham Shephard.
