= Chatoyancy =

Optical reflectance effect in materials

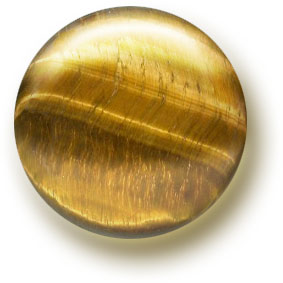
Tiger's eye

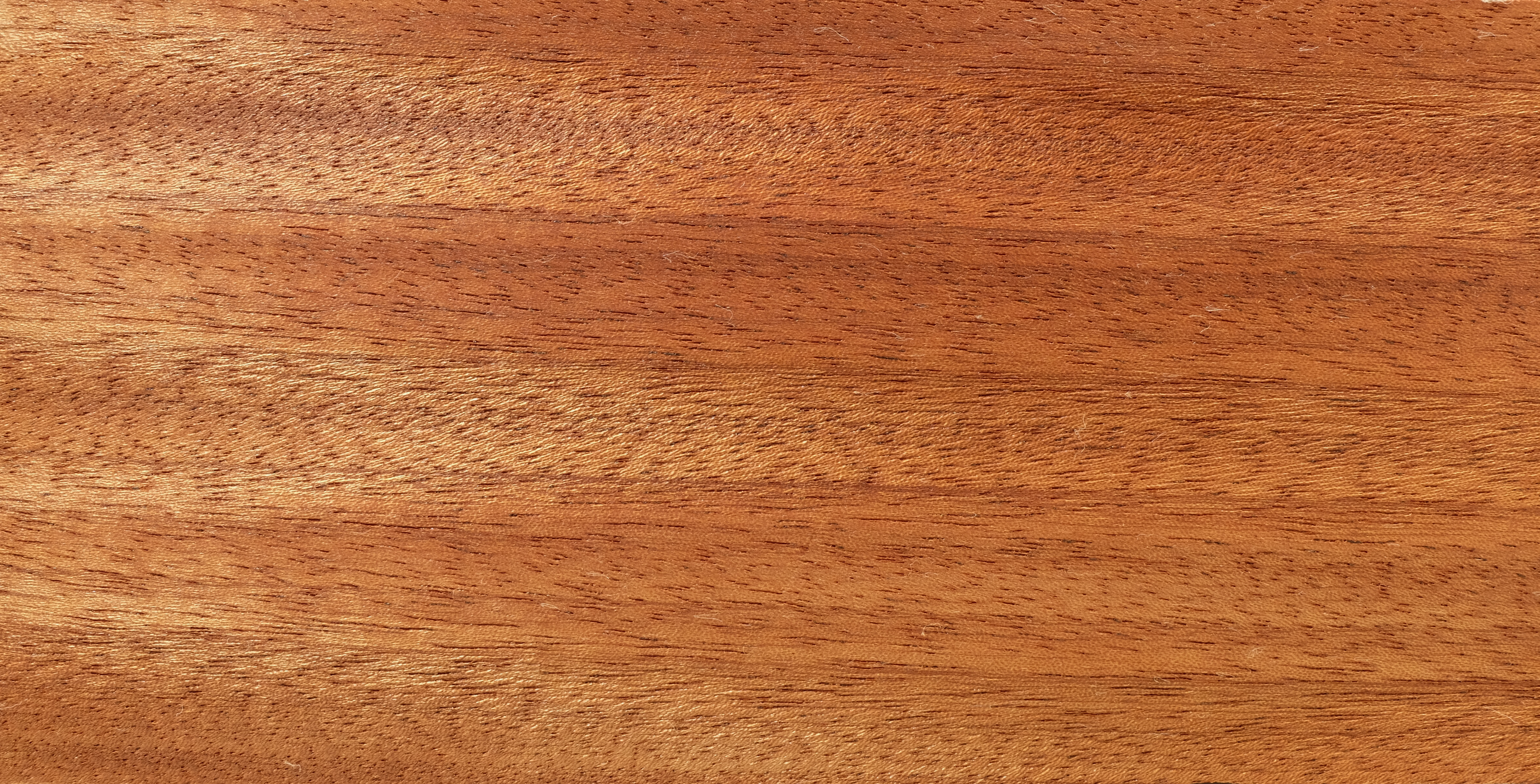
A tropical veneer exhibiting a very high chatoyancy

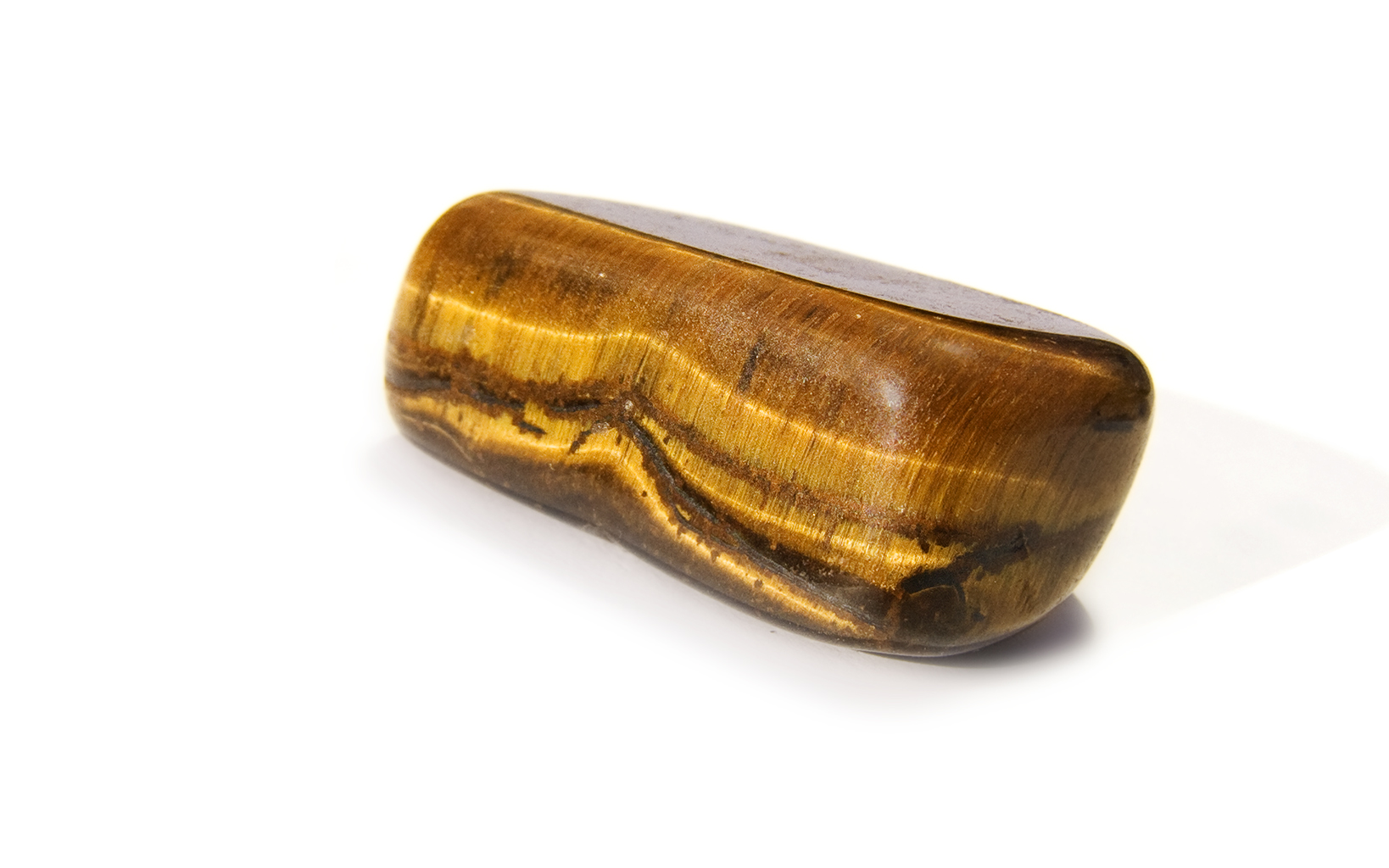
Tiger's eye

In gemology, chatoyancy (/ʃəˈtɔɪ.ənsi/ shə-TOY-ən-see), also called chatoyance or the cat's-eye effect, is an optical phenomenon in which a narrow, luminous band of reflected light appears across the surface of certain gemstones. The band resembles the slit pupil of a cat's eye and appears to glide across the surface as the stone, the light source, or the observer moves. The same terminology is used also in wood science to describe the phenomenon happening in some valuable wood species, like genuine mahoganies, khaya, sapele, sipo etc.

The term derives from the French œil de chat ("cat's eye"). Although historically used primarily in gemology, analogous optical effects occur in other fibrous or anisotropic materials, including wood, where they are commonly described as a special wood figure, or even chatoyancy.

Chatoyancy results from the directional reflection of light by parallel fibrous structures or aligned needle-like inclusions within a material. In tiger's eye, the effect is produced by parallel fibrous crystals, whereas in cat's-eye chrysoberyl it is caused by parallel microscopic inclusions or hollow tubes, commonly composed of or associated with rutile (titanium dioxide).

== Description ==
Chatoyancy in the gemstone chrysoberyl is induced by the presence of the mineral rutile, a mineral primarily composed of titanium dioxide. These rutile precipitates align perpendicularly, contributing to the cat's eye effect. This alignment is attributed to the rutile's lattice parameter, which matches only one of the three orthorhombic crystal axes of chrysoberyl, leading to its preferred orientation in that direction.

=== Optimal presentation of effect ===
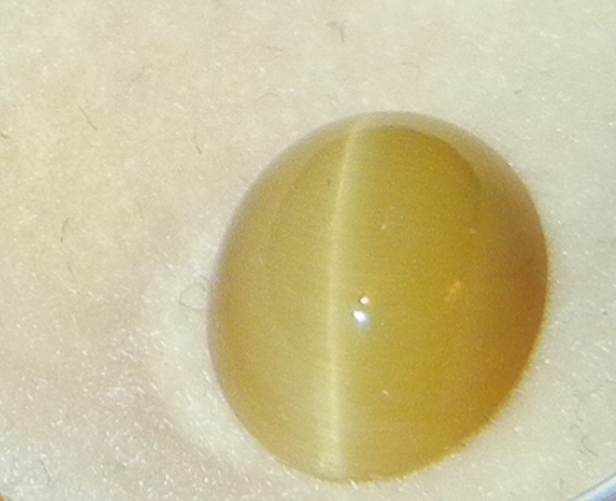
A cabochon yellow-green quartz showing the cat's-eye effect.

To bring out the chatoyancy effect, gemstones are typically fashioned into a cabochon cut, characterized by a rounded, flat base rather than facets, with the fibrous structures aligned parallel to the base. High-quality specimens display a single, sharply defined band of light that moves across the stone when rotated, while lower-quality stones may show a banded effect similar to cat's-eye quartz. Faceted stones do not showcase the effect well.

==== Varieties of chatoyant materials ====
Gem species known for this phenomenon include quartz, chrysoberyl, beryl (especially aquamarine varieties), charoite, tourmaline, labradorite, selenite, feldspar, apatite, moonstone, thomsonite and scapolite amongst others. Chatoyancy is not limited to gemstones but can also be found in wood and carbon fiber. Synthetically made gemstones with optical fibers can also have chatoyancy. These gemstones are available in a variety of vibrant colors.

==== Cat's eye terminology ====
Chatoyance on Tiger's Eye

When the term "cat's eye" is used to describe a gemstone by itself, it typically refers to cat's eye chrysoberyl. It can also be used as an adjective to indicate the chatoyance phenomenon in another stone, for example, cat's eye aquamarine.

== In woodworking ==
Chatoyancy in wood occurs in various species – particularly hardwoods and the various types of Nanmu woods of China and South East Asia, particularly where stresses from the weight of the growing tree result in denser patches, or where stresses cause burl or bird's eye. This 'figure', which has a striking three-dimensional appearance, is highly prized by woodworkers and their clients alike, and is featured regularly in furniture, musical instruments, and other decorative wood products. Figuring takes on a variety of forms and is referred to as flame, ribbon, tiger stripe, quilting, among other names.

This effect is sometimes called wet look, since wetting wood with water often displays the chatoyancy, albeit only until the wood dries. Certain finishes cause the wood grain to become more pronounced. Oil finishes, epoxy, and shellac can strongly bring out the wet look effect. When the refractive index of the finish nearly matches that of the wood, light scattering no longer occurs at the wood surface, adding the appearance of depth to the wood's figure.

=== Measurement ===
No method to measure wood chatoyance is unanimously accepted by the scientific community. Some methods have been proposed, such as one named PZC after the names of its inventors, Pisani, Zanetta and Codoro. This measure has been used to measure typical values for a number of wood species; some results are reported below:

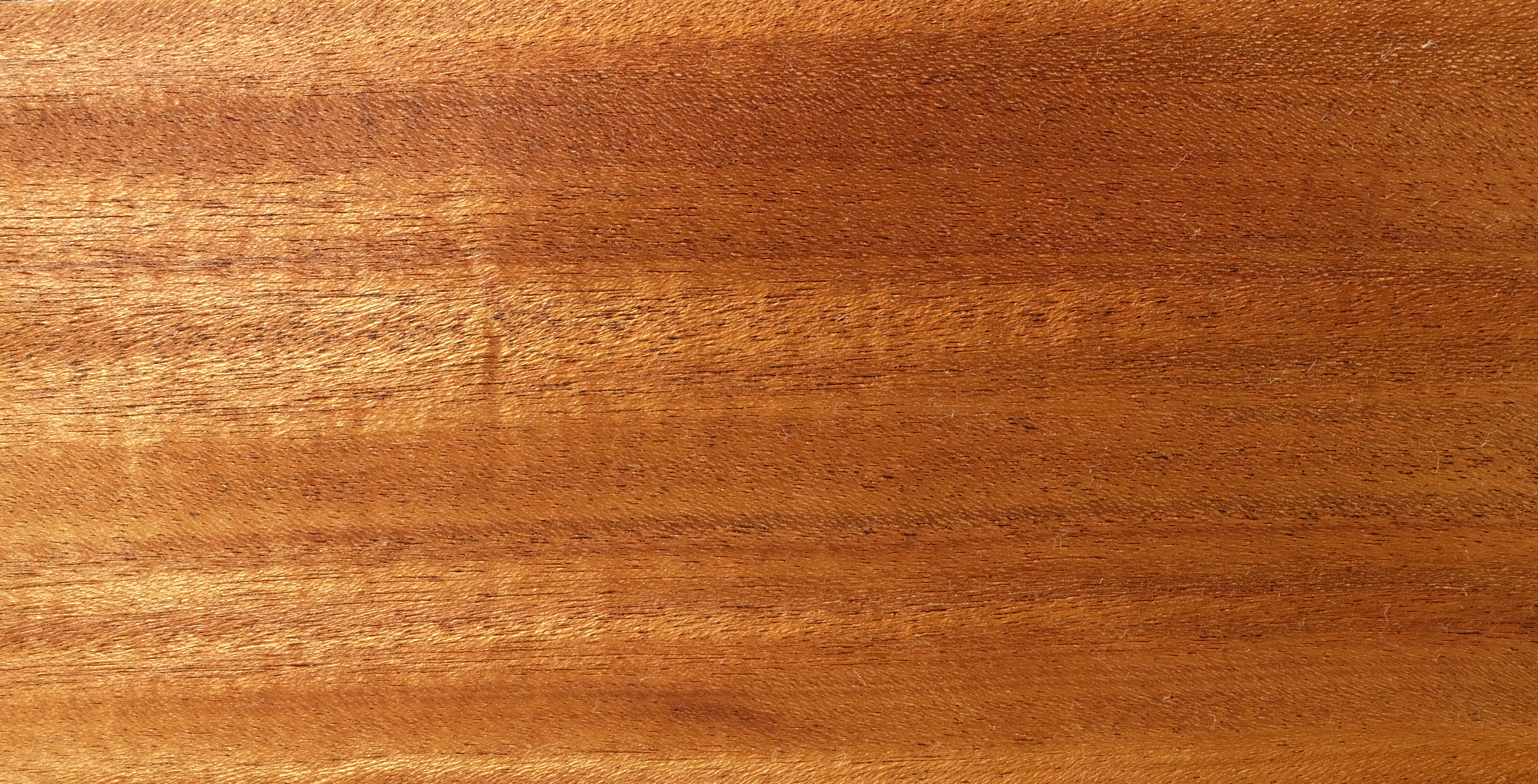
Veneer of African mahogany or Khaya (PZC: 23.0)

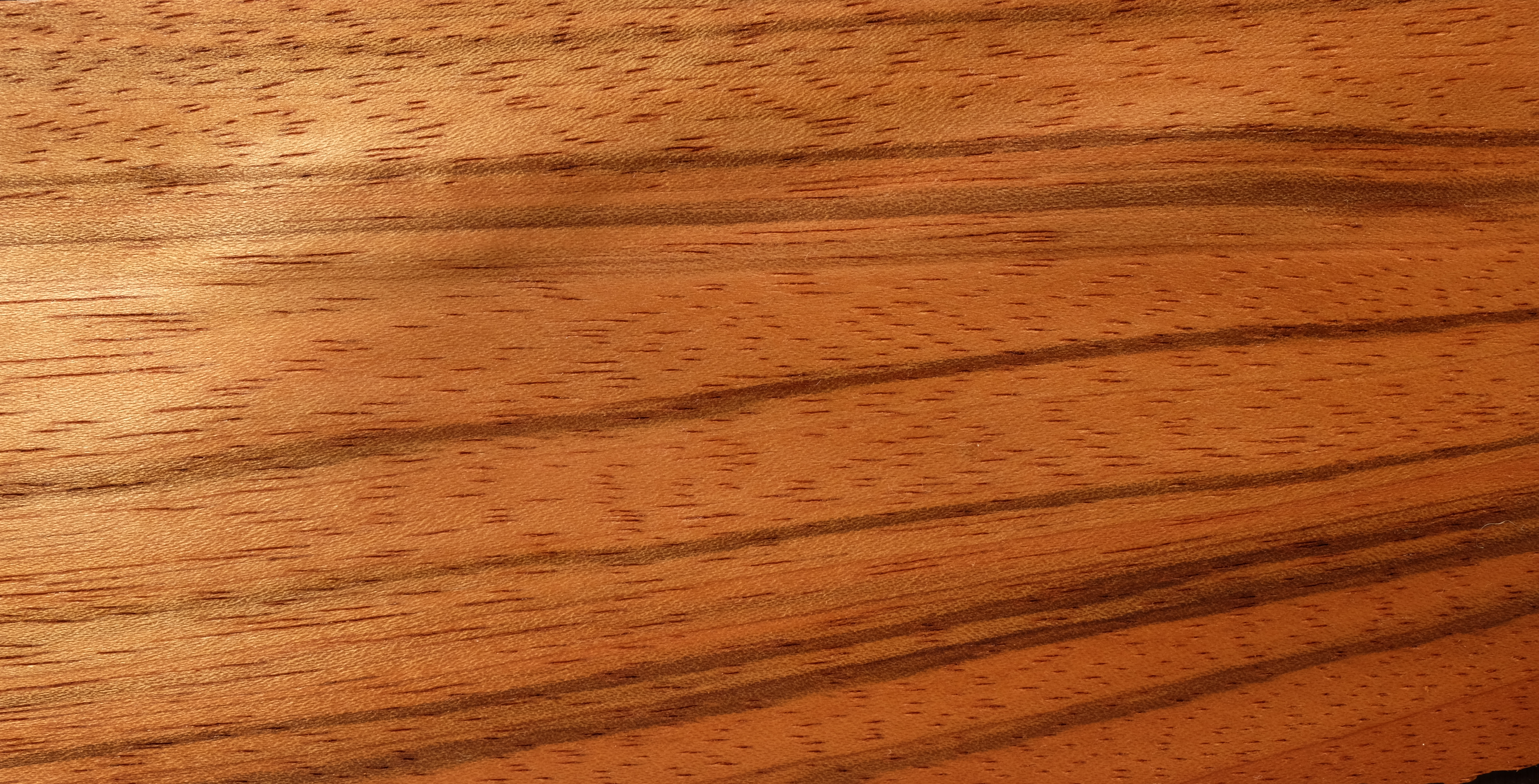
Veneer of Etimoe (PZC: 22.1)

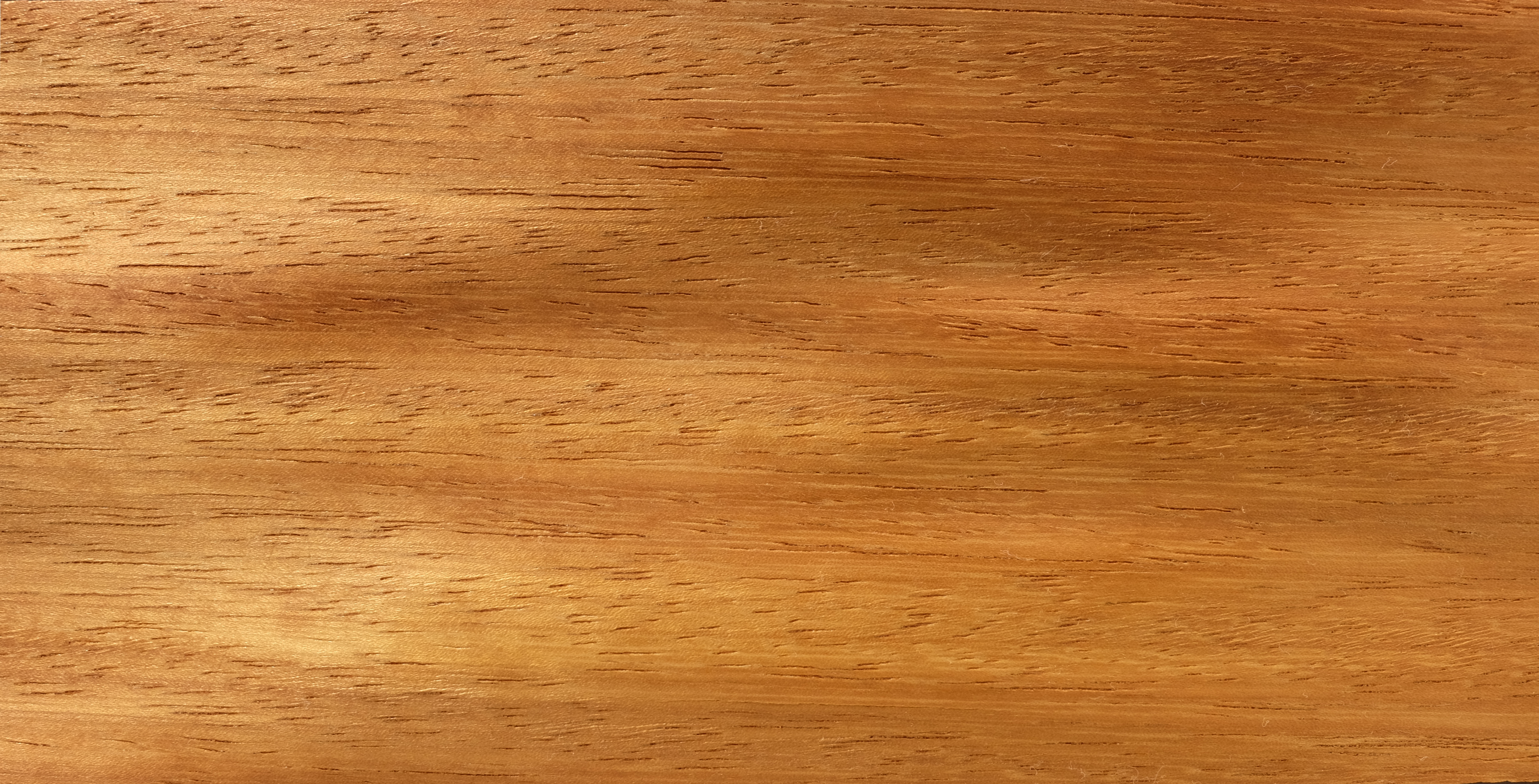
Veneer of Iroko or Kampala (PZC: 21.8)

Wood (common name)	PZC average
Afrormosia	14.2
Afzelia	14.1
Alder	15.0
Alder, Red	16.8
Anigre	14.4
Ash, American White	11.5
Ash, European	12.8
Ash, Olive	14.9
Beech, European	10.6
Birch	18.3
Black Locust	16.4
Bocote	11.5
Bog Oak	11.6
Bubinga	19.2
Cedar, European	7.6
Cedar, Spanish	21.3
Cerejeira	14.1
Cherry, Black	18.0
Cherry, Sweet	15.7
Chestnut, Sweet	14.4
Cypress, Mediterranean	9.3
Ebony, Macassar	11.3
Elm	14.5
Etimoe	22.1
Eucalyptus	13.9
Fir, Douglas	11.1
Fir, European Silver	10.0
Granadillo	14.3
Guarea	17.2
Ipe	11.7
Iroko	21.8
Jatoba	17.5
Khaya	23.0
Koa	26.4
Koto	12.5
Larch, European	10.9
Limba	16.1
Limba, Black	18.7
Lime, European	12.2
Louro Faia	17.4
Louro Preto	11.3
Mahogany, Honduras	21.4
Makore	21.0
Mansonia	18.0
Maple, European	14.2
Maple, Hard	16.1
Movingui	15.3
Mulberry	18.2
Oak, Red	12.2
Oak, Sessile	12.6
Obeche	11.1
Okoume	23.6
Olive	8.3
Osage Orange, Green	17.0
Ovangkol	20.0
Padouk	17.4
Pear	10.5
Pine, Swiss Stone	10.7
Pine, unspecified	13.2
Poplar	14.7
Poplar, Yellow	11.9
Purpleheart	13.7
Red Gum	12.6
Rosewood, Cocobolo	9.5
Rosewood, Indian	11.2
Rosewood, Kingwood	14.3
Rosewood, Madagascar	11.7
Rosewood, Santos	12.5
Sapele	20.7
Satinwood	13.9
Spruce, Fiemme	9.3
Sucupira hardwood	9.8
Teak	15.7
Tineo	14.7
Walnut, African	20.2
Walnut, Black	18.6
Walnut, European	17.5
Wenge	8.5
Yew	9.8
Zebrawood	19.1
Ziricote	7.0

== See also ==
- Gemology
- Asterism (gemology) – Star-shaped reflection
- Optical phenomena – Observable events that result from the interaction of light and matter
