= Beryllonite =

Phosphate mineral

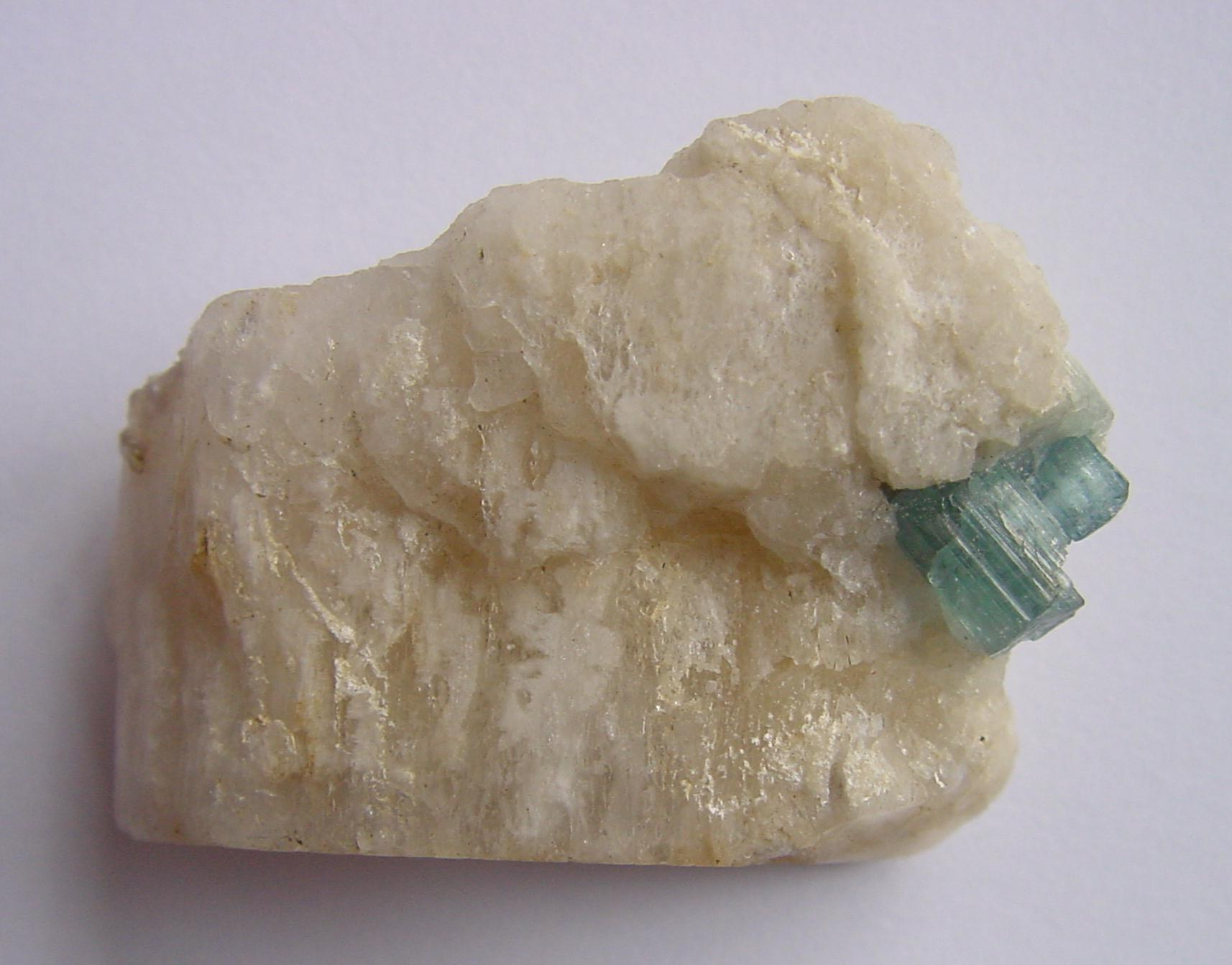
- Beryllonite (whitish) with tourmaline variety indicolite (blue) from Paprok, Nuristan Province, Afghanistan. Specimen size 4 cm

General
- Category: Phosphate minerals
- Formula: NaBePO_{4}
- IMA symbol: Bel
- Strunz classification: 8.AA.10
- Dana classification: 38.01.05.01
- Crystal system: Monoclinic
- Crystal class: Prismatic (2/m) (same H-M symbol)
- Space group: P2_{1}/n

Identification
- Color: Colorless, white to pale yellow
- Crystal habit: Crystals tabular {010} to short prismatic also in spherical aggregates, fibrous, massive; orthorhombic pseudo-symmetry
- Twinning: polysynthetic, contact and penetration twins; pseudo-hexagonal stellate forms
- Cleavage: {010} perfect; {100} good, interrupted; {101} indistinct; {001} in traces
- Fracture: Conchoidal
- Tenacity: Brittle
- Mohs scale hardness: 5.5 – 6
- Luster: Vitreous to adamantine, may be pearly on {010}
- Streak: White
- Diaphaneity: Transparent to translucent
- Specific gravity: 2.8
- Optical properties: Biaxial (−)
- Refractive index: n_{α} = 1.552 n_{β} = 1.558 n_{γ} = 1.561
- Birefringence: δ = 0.009
- 2V angle: 68°

Beryllonite is a rare phosphate mineral with formula NaBePO_{4}. The tabular to prismatic monoclinic crystals vary from colorless to white or pale yellowish, and are transparent with a vitreous luster. Twinning is common and occurs in several forms. It exhibits perfect cleavage in one direction. The hardness is 5.5 to 6 and the specific gravity is 2.8. Refractive indices are nα = 1.552, nβ = 1.558 and nγ = 1.561. A few crystals have been cut and faceted, but, as the refractive index is no higher than that of quartz, they do not make very brilliant gemstones.

It occurs as a secondary beryllium mineral in granitic and alkalic pegmatites. It was first described from complex crystals and as broken fragments in the disintegrated material of a granitic vein at Stoneham, Oxford County, Maine where it is associated with feldspar, smoky quartz, beryl and columbite. It was discovered by James Dwight Dana in 1888, and named beryllonite for its beryllium content.
