= Bigadiç mine =

Boron mine in Bigadiç, Turkey

- Location: Bigadiç, Balıkesir, Turkey
- Products: Boron

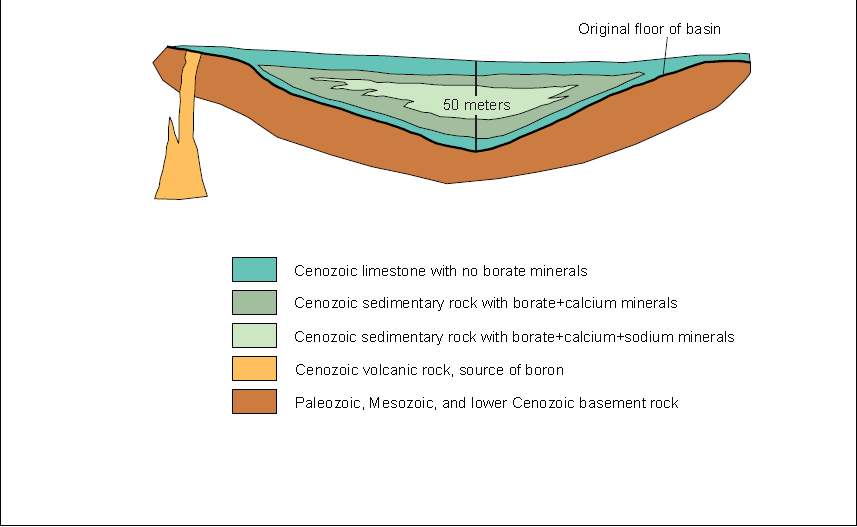
Bigadic Borate Mining area geologic cross section

The Bigadiç mine is a large boron ore mine located at Balıkesir Province in western Turkey. Bigadiç represents one of the largest boron reserves in Turkey, with an estimated reserve of 623.5 million tonnes of ore grading 30% boron. Most of this is split between colemanite and ulexite.

The Bigadiç mine consists of four separate open-pit mines. The mineral deposits consist of two layers: an upper one and a lower one. Both primarily consist of colemanite and ulexite; they differ mainly in the secondary minerals found in them: hydroboracite, howlite, and probertite in the upper layer, and inyoite, meyerhofferite, tertschite, and hydroboracite in the lower one.

Together, the four mines at Bigadiç produce a combined 1.5 megatonnes of boron per year (split between colemanite and ulexite). Production began in 1976. On-site ore processing began in 1980 with the addition of a concentrator facility; additional concentrators were added in 1985 and 2007, and specialized grinding facilities were added in 1998, 2007, and 2012. Boron processing at Bigadiç now encompasses crushing and grinding, filtering, homogenization, and packing. In 2016, total production of processed boron products at Bigadiç was about 520,000 tonnes, and the entire operation (including mining and processing) employed about 1,300 people.
