= Inyoite =

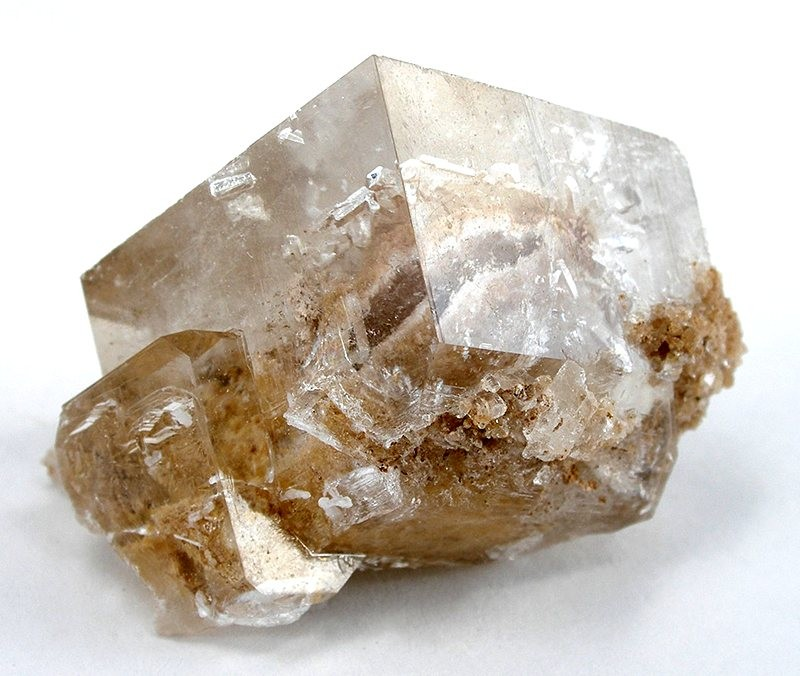

General
- Category: Nesoborates
- Formula: CaB_{3}O_{3}(OH)_{5}·4H_{2}O
- IMA symbol: Iyo
- Strunz classification: 6.CA.35
- Crystal system: Monoclinic
- Crystal class: Prismatic (2/m) (same H-M symbol)
- Space group: P2_{1}/a
- Unit cell: a = 10.63, b = 12.06 c = 8.4 [Å]; β = 114.03°; Z = 4

Identification
- Colour: Colourless, white on dehydration.
- Crystal habit: Commonly as prismatic to tabular crystals; also in cockscomb aggregates of pseudorhombohedral crystals; coarsely spherulitic or granular
- Cleavage: Good on {001}, distinct on {010}
- Fracture: Irregular/uneven
- Tenacity: Brittle
- Mohs scale hardness: 2
- Lustre: Vitreous
- Specific gravity: 1.875
- Optical properties: Biaxial (−)
- Refractive index: n_{α} = 1.495 n_{β} = 1.505 – 1.512 n_{γ} = 1.520
- Birefringence: Maximum δ = 0.025
- Dispersion: Weak

Inyoite, named after Inyo County, California, where it was discovered in 1914, is a colourless monoclinic mineral. It turns white on dehydration. Its chemical formula is Ca(H_{4}B_{3}O_{7})(OH)·4H_{2}O or CaB_{3}O_{3}(OH)_{5}·4H_{2}O. Associated minerals include priceite, meyerhofferite, colemanite, hydroboracite, ulexite and gypsum.
