= Studenitsite =

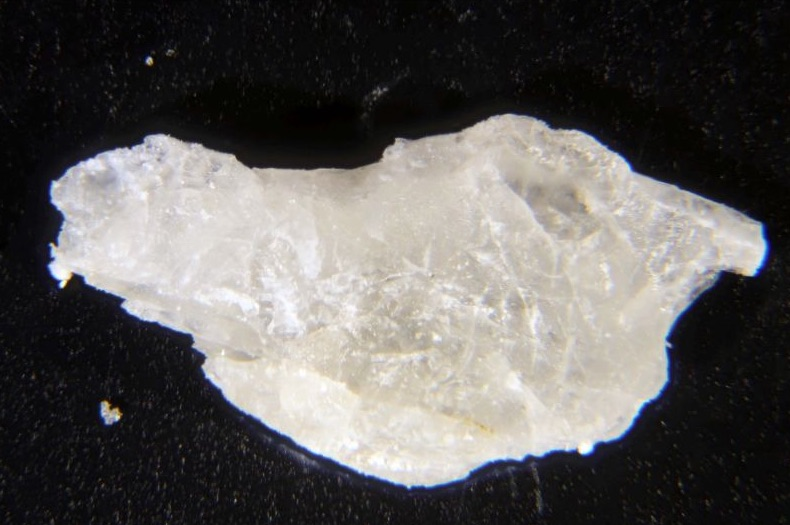
- Studenitsite from the type and only known locality worldwide

General
- Category: Phylloborates
- Formula: NaCa_{2}[B_{9}O_{14}(OH)_{4}]·2H_{2}O
- IMA symbol: Sdn
- Strunz classification: 6.GB.05
- Crystal system: Monoclinic
- Crystal class: Prismatic (2/m) (same H-M symbol)
- Space group: P2_{1}/c
- Unit cell: a = 11.4994 Å, b = 12.5878 Å c = 10.5297 Å; β = 99.416°; Z = 4

Identification
- Formula mass: 528 g/mol
- Color: Colorless to light dirty-yellow and light grey
- Crystal habit: Clusters of flattened wedge-shaped crystals
- Tenacity: Fragile
- Mohs scale hardness: 5.5–6
- Luster: Vitreous
- Streak: White
- Diaphaneity: Transparent
- Specific gravity: 2.29
- Optical properties: Biaxial (+)
- Refractive index: n_{α} = 1.532 n_{β} = 1.538 n_{γ} = 1.564
- Birefringence: δ = 0.032
- 2V angle: Measured: 54°
- Other characteristics: Named after Studenica, a cloister near the discovery locality.

Studenitsite is a rare borate mineral with chemical formula of NaCa_{2}[B_{9}O_{14}(OH)_{4}]·2H_{2}O.

Studenitsite has a vitreous luster, a Mohs hardness of 6 and color of light-dirty yellow. It is a monoclinic mineral and belongs to the space group P2/c. The basic unit of the crystal structure [B_{9}O_{14}(OH)_{4}]^{5−} layers has a Miller index of (001). Studenitsite has a low surface relief, which means the measure of the relative difference between the index of refraction of the mineral and surrounding medium is small. Birefringence is the difference between two principal indices of refraction of a uniaxial crystal. Studenitsite has a maximum birefringent value of δ = 0.032. Studenitsite has three indices of refraction. Their values are n_{α} = 1.532, n_{β} = 1.538, n_{γ} = 1.564. Indices of refraction are the ratio of the light's speed in the mineral and the medium.

Studenitsite is an extremely rare mineral that has only been found in the Piskaya deposit, Yarondolskii Basin, on the Ibar River, 280 km south of Belgrade, Serbia. The deposit is classified as a volcanogenic-sedimentary borate deposit with clay and carbonate minerals. It occurs associated with colemanite, howlite, ulexite and pentahydroborite. It is a rare but important mineral for understanding the volcanic settings in Western Serbia. It was named after the Studenica cloister near the discovery location.

== See also ==
- List of minerals
