= Calcioveatchite =

New Mineral Calcioveatchite

- Crystals of calcioveatchite

General
- Category: Borates
- Formula: SrCaB_{11}O_{16}(OH)_{5}·H_{2}O
- Space group: Monoclinic

Identification
- Color: Colorless
- Crystal habit: Prismatic to tabular crystals, dense aggregates
- Cleavage: Perfect
- Fracture: Brittle
- Mohs scale hardness: 2
- Luster: Vitreous
- Streak: White
- Diaphaneity: Transparent
- Density: 2.58 g/cm³

Calcioveatchite is a rare strontium calcium borate mineral with the chemical formula SrCaB_{11}O_{16}(OH)_{5}·H_{2}O. It is the calcium dominant analogue of veatchite.

== Discovery and occurrence ==
The mineral was discovered at a depth of 911 meters in drill cores from the Nepskoe potassium salt deposit in the Irkutsk Oblast region of Siberia, Russia. It occurs within evaporite rock formations, often associated with halite, sylvite, boracite, and veatchite. It was officially approved by the International Mineralogical Association (IMA) in 2020 under the code IMA2020-011.

== Properties ==
Calcioveatchite forms small, colorless, transparent crystals up to 1 × 1.5 × 3 mm³ in size. It has a vitreous (glassy) luster and a white streak. With a Mohs hardness of approximately 2, it is a relatively soft and brittle mineral. It crystallizes in the monoclinic crystal system and is entirely non-fluorescent under ultraviolet light.
