= Serendibite =

Harar

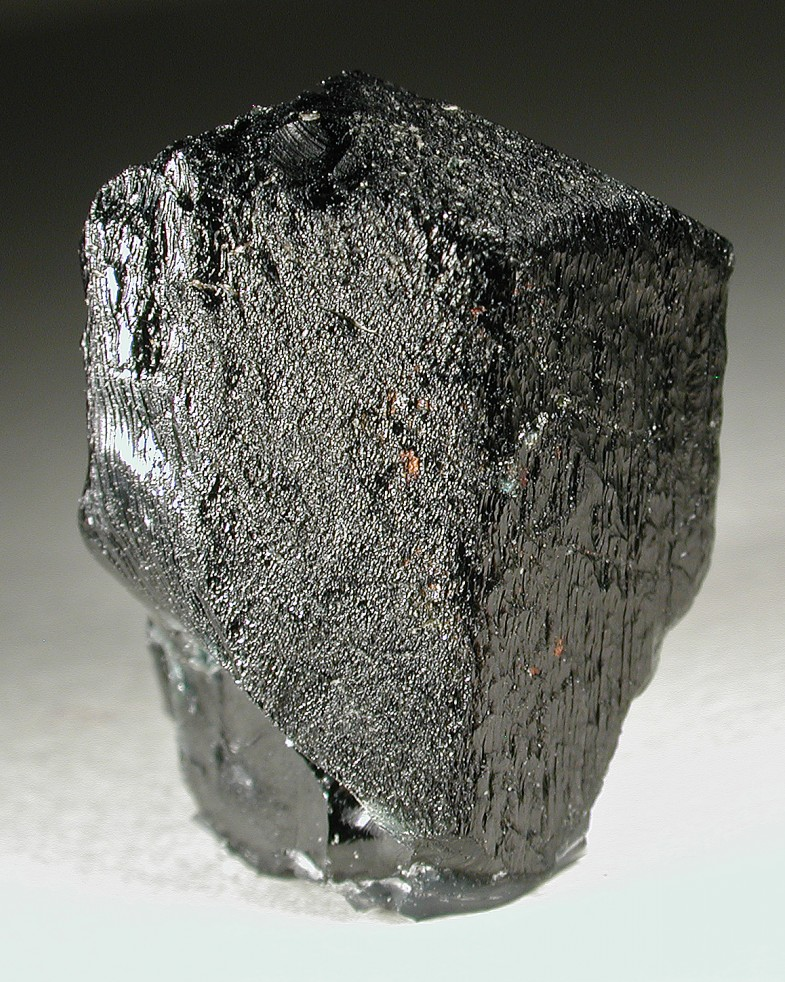
- A relatively sharp, vitreous black crystal of serendibite from Le Oo, in Mogok Township, measures: 16 x 13 x 8 mm

General
- Category: Inosilicates
- Formula: (Ca,Na)_{2}(Mg,Fe^{2+})_{3}(Al,Fe^{3+})_{3}[O_{2}|(Si,Al,B)_{6}O_{18}]
- IMA symbol: Ser
- Strunz classification: 9.DH.40
- Dana classification: 69.2.1a.6
- Crystal system: Triclinic
- Crystal class: Pinacoidal (1̅) (same H-M symbol)
- Space group: P1̅

Identification
- Color: pale yellow, blue-green, greyish blue, black
- Twinning: Polysynthetic on {0–11} is common
- Cleavage: None observed
- Fracture: Uncommon, conchoidal
- Mohs scale hardness: 6.5 – 7
- Luster: Vitreous
- Streak: White
- Diaphaneity: Transparent, Translucent, Opaque
- Specific gravity: 3.42 – 3.52 (measured) 3.47 (calculated)
- Optical properties: Biaxial (+)
- Refractive index: 1.701 – 1.706
- Pleochroism: Visible, strong, color: green, blue, yellow, light blue, bluegreen, light yellow
- 2V angle: Measured: 80°
- Dispersion: strong

Serendibite is an extremely rare silicate mineral that was first discovered in 1902 in Sri Lanka by Dunil Palitha Gunasekera and named after Serendib, the old Arabic name for Sri Lanka.

The mineral is found in skarns associated with boron metasomatism of carbonate rocks where intruded by granite. Minerals occurring with serendibite include diopside, spinel, phlogopite, scapolite, calcite, tremolite, apatite, grandidierite, sinhalite, hyalophane, uvite, pargasite, clinozoisite, forsterite, warwickite and graphite.

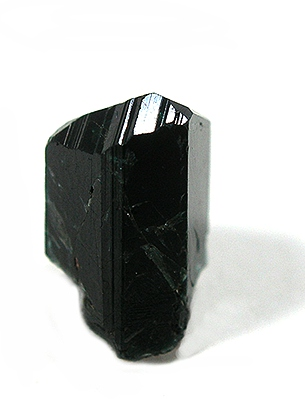
Crystal from Mogok, Myanmar, size: 1 cm x 0.7 cm x 0.7 cm

== See also ==
- List of minerals
