= Chambersite =

Manganese borate mineral

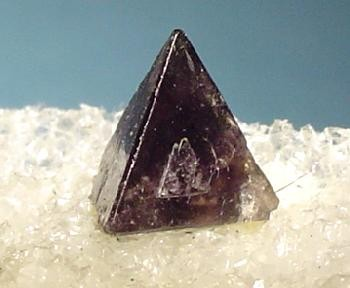
- Chambersite from Barber's Hill Salt Dome, Mont Belvieu, Texas USA, the type locality. Size: 0.7 cm × 0.6 cm × 0.6 cm (0.28 in × 0.24 in × 0.24 in).

General
- Category: Tektoborates
- Formula: Mn_{3}B_{7}O_{13}Cl
- IMA symbol: Cbs
- Strunz classification: 6.GA.05
- Crystal system: Orthorhombic
- Crystal class: Pyramidal (mm2); (same H-M symbol)
- Space group: Pca2_{1}

Identification
- Color: Colorless to deep purple
- Crystal habit: Pseudocubic crystals
- Twinning: Rare as interpenetration twins on [111]
- Cleavage: None
- Fracture: Subconchoidal to uneven
- Mohs scale hardness: 7
- Luster: Vitreous
- Diaphaneity: Transparent to opaque
- Specific gravity: 3.49
- Optical properties: Biaxial (+)
- Refractive index: n_{α} = 1.732 n_{β} = 1.737 n_{γ} = 1.744
- Birefringence: δ = 0.012
- 2V angle: Measured: 83°
- Dispersion: r > v
- Alters to: Color darkens when exposed to sunlight

Chambersite is a manganese borate mineral with formula Mn_{3}B_{7}O_{13}Cl. It is a member of the borate mineral series that includes other minerals such as ericaite (Fe_{3}B_{7}O_{13}Cl) and boracite (Mg_{3}B_{7}O_{13}Cl). When chambersite was first discovered, it was the second chemical analogue of boracite to be found in nature. It was discovered as a mineral at Barber's Hill salt dome in Texas in 1957 and in 1971 at the Dongshuichang deposit in Jixian, Tianjin, China. Chambersite occurs associated with the evaporite minerals halite, anhydrite, and gypsum.

== Chemical and physical properties ==
When chambersite was first discovered in Barber's Hill, the dominant form was the positive tetrahedron, but single morphological twinned crystal was found with interpenetrating tetrahedrons with the twinning axis. The ore discovered in China had formed in high grades that are spindle and granular that form micritic aggregates because the boron present is very pure and in low grades that had formed spheroids that are radially oriented. When chambersite in China was compared it had the same chemical oxide ratio as the samples found in Barber's Hill.

Oxide	Chemical composition of chambersite in oxide percent
B_{2}O_{3}	49.50
MnO	41.87
Cl	6.34
FeO	1.28
MgO	0.05
CaO	trace
Total %	99.04

== Geologic occurrence ==
Chambersite minerals were first found in 1957 in brine returns from a gas storage well in the Barber's Hill salt dome. The age of the dome is not definitely known, but it is at least dates back to the Cretaceous and possibly upper Jurassic. Other chambersite deposits with this similar geologic occurrence can be found in the area of the Gulf Coast of Mexico. The Venice dome in Plaquemines Parish, Louisiana is a site that has a shallow piercement salt dome, LPG storage and brine production. Other chambersite deposits can be found in the Penobsquis deposit in Southern New Brunswick, Canada, which has high grade salt deposits as well as a significant borate mineral concentration, including chambersite. Other chambersite deposits can be found as ores in Ji County, Tianjin, China, an area that is known to have had much magnetic activity and submarine volcanism in a subtidal lagoon.

== Special characteristics ==
Chambersite was named after the county where it was first discovered, Chambers County, Texas, US. Optical examination and x-ray powder diffraction indicated the mineral to be related to boracite but different from any other published description.

== See also ==
- List of minerals
