= Pinnoite =

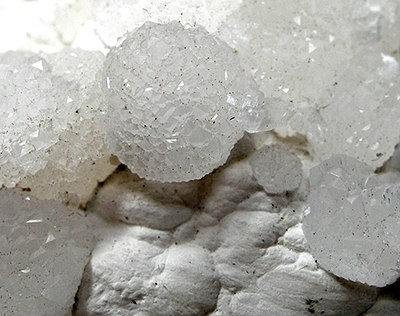
- Pinnoite clusters from a salt dome in the Atyrau Oblast, Kazakhstan

General
- Category: Borate mineral
- Formula: MgB_{2}O(OH)_{6}
- IMA symbol: Pno
- Strunz classification: 6.BB.05
- Crystal system: Tetragonal
- Crystal class: Pyramidal (4); H-M symbol: (4)
- Space group: P4_{2}
- Unit cell: a = 7.617 Å, c = 8.19 Å; Z = 4

Identification
- Color: Colorless, light yellow, yellow green
- Crystal habit: Short prismatic crystals uncommon; radial fibrous clusters
- Fracture: Uneven
- Mohs scale hardness: 3.5
- Luster: Vitreous
- Diaphaneity: Translucent
- Specific gravity: 2.27
- Optical properties: Uniaxial (+)
- Refractive index: n_{ω} = 1.565 n_{ε} = 1.575
- Birefringence: δ = 0.010

Pinnoite is a magnesium borate mineral with formula: MgB_{2}O(OH)_{6} or MgB_{2}O_{4}·3(H_{2}O). It crystallizes in the tetragonal crystal system and occurs as colorless to yellow or light green radial fibrous clusters and rarely as short prismatic crystals.

Pinnoite was first described in 1884 for an occurrence in the Stassfurt potash deposit, Saxony-Anhalt, Germany and named for the mine counselor Oberbergrat Pinno of Halle, Germany. It occurs in marine evaporite deposits and as efflorescence associated with mineral springs. It occurs with boracite and kaliborite. It also occurs in the borax mines of Death Valley in California, the Da Quidam saline lake of the Qinghai-Xizang Plateau in Tibet and in Socacastro, Salta Province, Argentina.
