= Borate mineral =

Mineral which contains a borate anion group

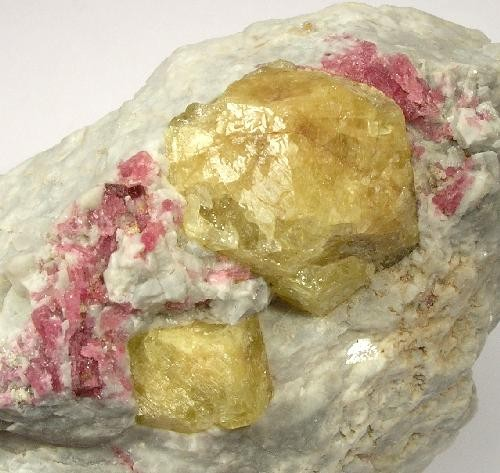
Large (up to 1.8 cm) yellow londonite crystals associated with rubellite tourmaline. Londonite is an unusual caesium-rich heptaborate.

The Borate Minerals are minerals which contain a borate anion group. The borate (BO_{3}) units may be polymerised similar to the SiO_{4} unit of the silicate mineral class. This results in B_{2}O_{5}, B_{3}O_{6}, B_{2}O_{4} anions as well as more complex structures which include hydroxide or halogen anions. The [B(O,OH)_{4}]^{−} anion exists as well.

Many borate minerals, such as borax, colemanite, and ulexite, are salts: soft, readily soluble, and found in evaporite contexts. However, some, such as boracite, are hard and resistant to weathering, more similar to the silicates.

There are over 100 different borate minerals. Borate minerals include:

- Kernite Na_{2}B_{4}O_{6}(OH)_{2}·3H_{2}O
- Borax Na_{2}B_{4}O_{5}(OH)_{4}·8H_{2}O
- Ulexite NaCaB_{5}O_{6}(OH)_{6}·5H_{2}O
- Colemanite CaB_{3}O_{4}(OH)_{3}·H_{2}O
- Boracite Mg_{3}B_{7}O_{13}Cl
- Painite CaZrAl_{9}O_{15}(BO_{3})

== Nickel–Strunz Classification -06- Borates ==
IMA-CNMNC proposes a new hierarchical scheme (Mills et al., 2009). This list uses it to modify the Classification of Nickel–Strunz (mindat.org, 10 ed, pending publication). Note that although Nickel–Strunz division letters were traditionally based on the number of boron atoms in a mineral's chemical formula (06.A are monoborates, 06.B are diborates, etc.), the IMA has reclassified borate minerals based on the polymerisation of the borate anion.

Abbreviations

- REE: rare-earth element (Sc, Y, La, Ce, Pr, Nd, Pm, Sm, Eu, Gd, Tb, Dy, Ho, Er, Tm, Yb, Lu)
- PGE: platinum-group element (Ru, Rh, Pd, Os, Ir, Pt)
- * : discredited (IMA/CNMNC status)
- ? : questionable/doubtful (IMA/CNMNC status)

Regarding 03.C Aluminofluorides, 06 Borates, 08 Vanadates (04.H V^{[5,6]} Vanadates), 09 Silicates:

- neso-: insular (from Greek νῆσος nêsos, "island")
- soro-: grouped (from Greek σωρός sōrós, "heap, pile, mound")
- cyclo-: rings of (from Greek κύκλος kúklos, "circle")
- ino-: chained (from Greek ίνα ína, "fibre", [from Ancient Greek ἴς])
- phyllo-: sheets of (from Greek φῠ́λλον phúllon, "leaf")
- tekto-: three-dimensional framework (from Greek τεκτονικός tektōnikós, "of building")

Nickel–Strunz code scheme: NN.XY.##x

- NN: Nickel–Strunz mineral class number
- X: Nickel–Strunz mineral division letter
- Y: Nickel–Strunz mineral family letter
- ##x: Nickel–Strunz mineral/group number; x an add-on letter

=== Class: borates ===
- 06. Alfredstelznerite
- 06.A Monoborates
  - 06.AA BO_{3}, without additional anions; 1(D): 05 Sassolite; 15 Nordenskioldine, 15 Tusionite; 35 Jimboite, 35 Kotoite; 40 Takedaite
  - 06.AB BO_{3}, with additional anions; 1(D) + OH, etc.: 05 Hambergite, 10 Berborite, 15 Jeremejevite; 20 Warwickite, 20 Yuanfuliite; 25 Karlite; 30 Azoproite, 30 Bonaccordite, 30 Fredrikssonite, 30 Ludwigite, 30 Vonsenite; 35 Pinakiolite; 40 Blatterite, 40 Orthopinakiolite, 40 Takeuchiite, 40 Chestermanite; 45 Hulsite, 45 Magnesiohulsite, 45 Aluminomagnesiohulsite; 50 Hydroxylborite, 50 Fluoborite; 55 Shabynite, 55 Wightmanite; 60 Gaudefroyite, 65 Sakhaite, 70 Harkerite; 75 IMA2008-060, 75 Pertsevite; 80 Jacquesdietrichite, 85 Painite
  - 06.AC B(O,OH)_{4}, without and with additional anions; 1(T), 1(T)+OH, etc.: 05 Sinhalite; 10 Pseudosinhalite; 15 Béhierite, 15 Schiavinatoite; 20 Frolovite; 25 Hexahydroborite; 30 Henmilite; 35 Bandylite; 40 Teepleite; 45 Moydite-(Y); 50 Carboborite; 55 Sulfoborite; 60 Luneburgite; 65 Seamanite; 70 Cahnite
- 06.H Unclassified Borates
  - 06.HA Unclassified borates: 05 Chelkarite; 10 Braitschite-(Ce); 15 Satimolite; 20 Iquiqueite; 25 Wardsmithite; 30 Korzhinskite; 35 Halurgite; 40 Ekaterinite; 45 Vitimite; 50 Canavesite; 55 Qilianshanite

==== Subclass: nesoborates ====
- 06.BA Neso-diborates with double triangles B_{2}(O,OH)_{5}; 2(2D); 2(2D) + OH, etc.: 05 Suanite; 10 Clinokurchatovite, 10 Kurchatovite; 15 Sussexite, 15 Szaibelyite; 20 Wiserite
- 06.BB Neso-diborates with double tetrahedra B_{2}O(OH)_{6}; 2(2T): 05 Pinnoite; 10 Pentahydroborite
- 06.CA Neso-triborates: 10 Ameghinite; 15 Inderite; 20 Kurnakovite; 25 Inderborite; 30 Meyerhofferite; 35 Inyoite; 40 Solongoite; 45 Peprossiite-(Ce); 50 Nifontovite; 55 Olshanskyite
- 06.DA Neso-tetraborates: 10 Borax; 15 Tincalconite; 20 Hungchaoite; 25 Fedorovskite, 25 Roweite; 30 Hydrochlorborite; 35 Uralborite; 40 Numanoite, 40 Borcarite; 60 Fontarnauite
- 06.EA Neso-pentaborates: 05 Sborgite; 10 Ramanite-(Rb), 10 Ramanite-(Cs), 10 Santite; 15 Ammonioborite; 25 Ulexite
- 06.FA Neso-hexaborates: 05 Aksaite; 10 Mcallisterite; 15 Admontite; 20 Rivadavite; 25 Teruggite

==== Subclass: inoborates ====
- 06.BC Ino-diborates with triangles and/or tetrahedra: 10 Calciborite, 10 Aldzhanite*; 15 Vimsite; 20 Sibirskite, 20 Parasibirskite
- 06.CB Ino-triborates: 10 Colemanite; 15 Hydroboracite; 20 Howlite; 25 Jarandolite
- 06.DB Ino-tetraborates: 05 Kernite
- 06.EB Ino-pentaborates: 05 Larderellite; 10 Ezcurrite; 15 Probertite; 20 Tertschite; 25 Priceite
- 06.FB Ino-hexaborates: 05 Aristarainite; 10 Kaliborite

==== Subclass: phylloborates ====
- 06.CC Phyllo-triborates: 05 Johachidolite
- 06.EC Phyllo-pentaborates: 05 Biringuccite, 05 Nasinite; 10 Gowerite; 15 Veatchite, 15 Veatchite-A, 15 Veatchite-p; 20 Volkovskite; 25 Tuzlaite; 30 Heidornite; 35 Brianroulstonite
- 06.FC Phyllo-hexaborates: 05 Nobleite, 05 Tunellite, 05 Balavinskite; 10 Strontioborite; 15 Ginorite, 15 Strontioginorite; 20 Fabianite
- 06.GB Phyllo-nonaborates, etc.: 05 Studenitsite; 10 Penobsquisite; 15 Preobrazhenskite; 20 Walkerite

==== Subclass: tektoborates ====
- 06.BD Tektodiborates with tetrahedra: 05 Santarosaite
- 06.DD Tekto-tetraborates: 05 Diomignite
- 06.ED Tekto-pentaborates: 05 IMA2007-047, 05 Tyretskite, 05 Hilgardite, 05 Kurgantaite
- 06.GA Tekto-heptaborates: 05 Boracite, 05 Chambersite, 05 Ericaite; 10 Congolite, 10 Trembathite
- 06.GC Tekto-dodecaborates: 05 Rhodizite, 05 Londonite
- 06.GD Mega-tektoborates: 05 Ruitenbergite, 05 Pringleite; 10 Metaborite

== See also ==
- Classification of minerals - Non-silicates
- Classification of minerals - Silicates
