= Georg Ludwig Ulex =

German chemist and politician

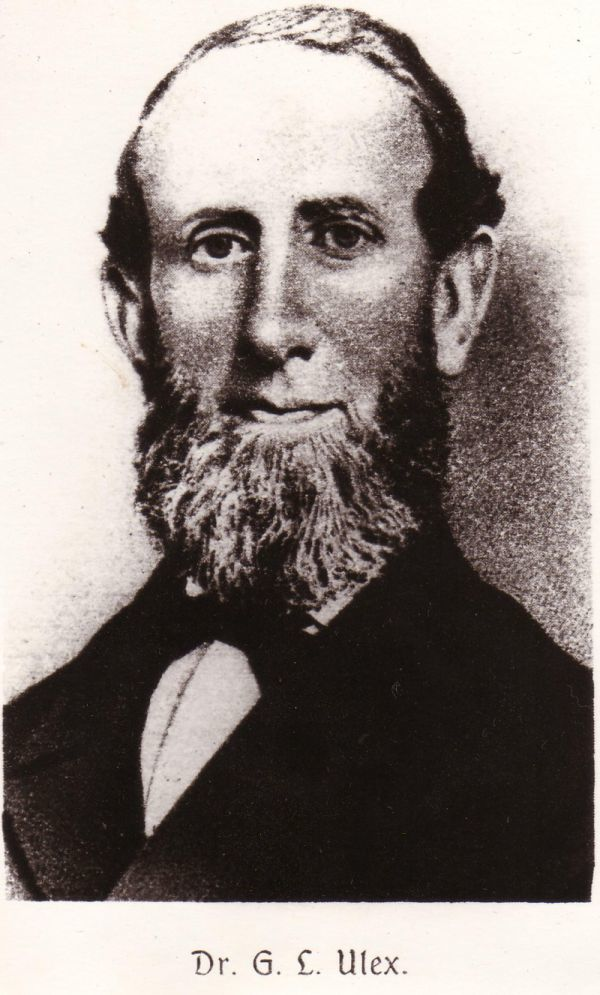
- Georg Ludwig Ulex c. 1875
- Born: 8 October 1811; Neuhaus an der Oste, Lower Saxony, Germany
- Died: 25 March 1883 (aged 71); Altona, Hamburg, Germany
- Occupations: Chemist and politician

Georg Ludwig Ulex (8 October 1811 – 25 March 1883) was a German chemist and politician.

== Biography ==
Ulex was born in Neuhaus an der Oste, in Lower Saxony, Germany to Georg Friedrich Ulrich (1841–1907), a pharmacist in Hamburg. He apprenticed as a pharmacist himself in Hamburg, then studied in Berlin. Upon returning to Hamburg, he ran a pharmacy from 1839. From 1840 he taught chemistry and physics at the Hamburg pharmaceutical school, and in 1873 became a Handelschemiker (a commercial/forensic chemist), a post he held until his death.

Ulex provided an early description of the phosphate mineral struvite in 1845, naming it in honour of geographer and geologist Heinrich Christian Gottfried von Struve (1772–1851) of Hamburg.

The mineral ulexite was discovered in 1839 and named after him in 1840, in recognition of his publication of the first chemical analysis of the mineral.

During the revolutions of 1848, Ulex was elected to the constituent assembly of Hamburg and assisted in drafting its new consitutution, adopted in 1860. He was a member of the Hamburg Constituent Assembly from 1859 to 1860, and a member of the Hamburg Parliament from 1862 to 1874.

Ulex was awarded an honorary Ph.D. by the University of Rostock in 1871. He spent his final years in Altona, where he died in 1883.
