= Fontarnauite =

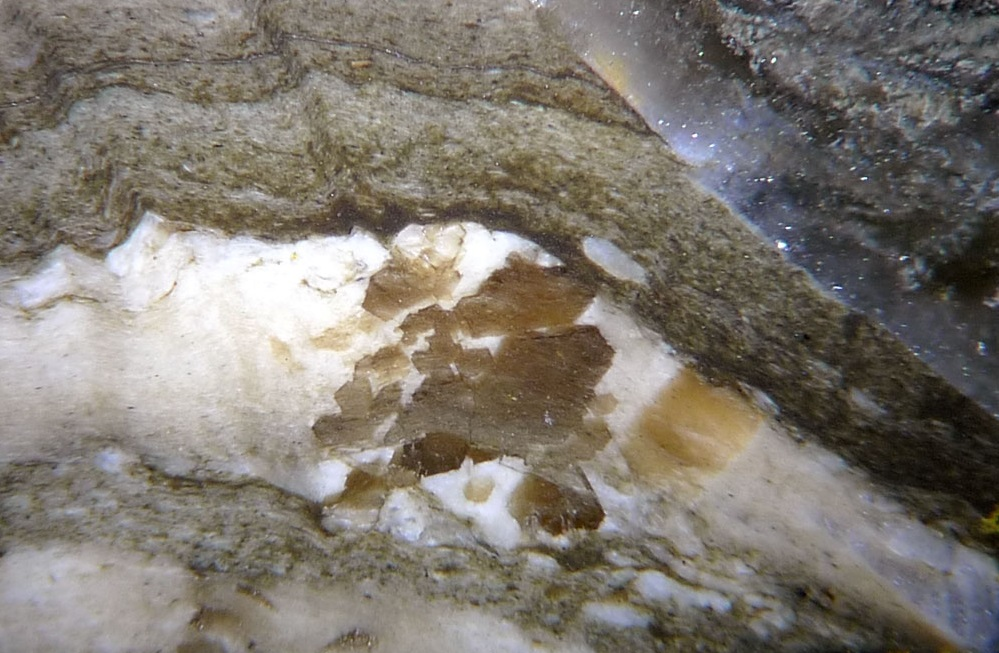
- Fontarnauite, Anatolia, West Turkey

General
- Category: Borate minerals
- Formula: (Na,K)_{2}(Sr,Ca)(SO_{4})[B_{5}O_{8}(OH)]·2H_{2}O
- IMA symbol: Fon
- Strunz classification: 6.DA.60
- Crystal system: Monoclinic
- Crystal class: Prismatic (2/m) (same H-M symbol)
- Space group: P2_{1}/c

Identification
- Color: Light brown
- Cleavage: Perfect {010}
- Mohs scale hardness: 2.5 - 3

Fontarnauite is a relatively recently described, rare sulfate, borate mineral with the chemical formula (Na,K)_{2}(Sr,Ca)(SO_{4})[B_{5}O_{8}(OH)]·2H_{2}O. It is found in an evaporite boron deposit. It coexists with other evaporite boron minerals, especially probertite. It is monoclinic, crystallizing in the space group P2_{1}/c.

It was named for Ramon Fontarnau i Griera, a materials scientist of the University of Barcelona.
