= Berborite =

Borate mineral

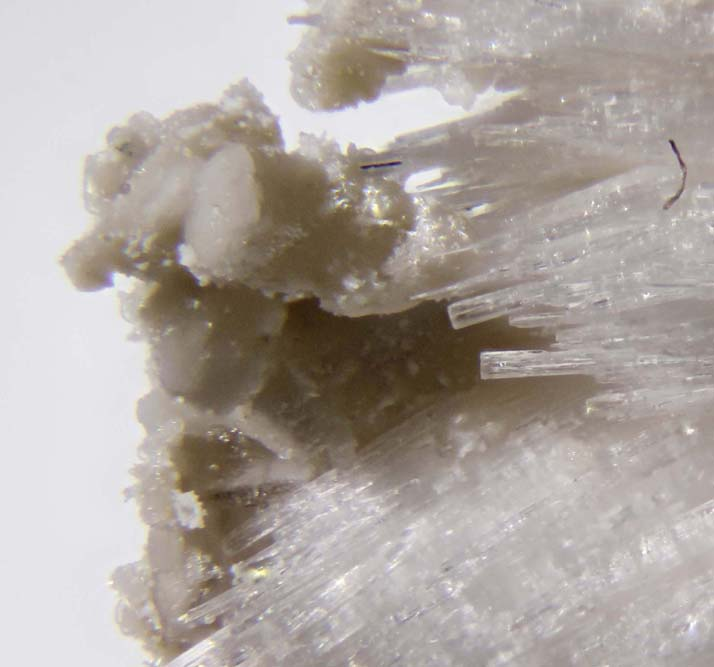
- Berborite on natrolite

General
- Category: Borate minerals
- Formula: Be_{2}(BO_{3})(OH,F)•H_{2}O
- IMA symbol: Bbo
- Strunz classification: 6.AB.10
- Dana classification: 26.1.1.1
- Crystal system: 1T polytype: Trigonal; 2H polytype: Hexagonal; 2T polytype: Trigonal
- Crystal class: 1T polytype: Pyramidal (3); 2H polytype: Pyramidal (6); 2T polytype: Ditrigonal pyramidal (3m)
- Space group: 1T polytype: P3 (no. 143); 2H polytype: P6_{3} (no. 173); 2T polytype: P3c1 (no. 158)
- Unit cell: a = 4.43 Å, c = 5.34 Å; Z = 2; V = 90.76 Å^{3} (2H polytype)

Identification
- Color: Colorless
- Twinning: Complex
- Cleavage: {0001} Perfect
- Fracture: Uneven - Flat surfaces (not cleavage) fractured in an uneven pattern.
- Mohs scale hardness: 3
- Luster: Vitreous (Glassy)
- Streak: white
- Diaphaneity: Transparent
- Density: 2.2
- Optical properties: Uniaxial (-)
- Refractive index: nω = 1.580 nε = 1.485
- Birefringence: δ = 0.095
- Ultraviolet fluorescence: none

Berborite is a beryllium borate mineral with the chemical formula Be_{2}(BO_{3})(OH,F)·(H_{2}O). It is colorless and leaves a white streak. Its crystals are hexagonal to pyramidal. It is transparent and has vitreous luster. It is not radioactive. Berborite is rated 3 on the Mohs Scale.

Berborite occurs in 1T, 2T, 2H polytypes.

It was first described in 1967 for an occurrence in the Lupikko Mine, Ladoga Region Karelia Republic, Russia. It has also been reported in two places in Norway: Tvedalen in Larvik Municipality in Vestfold county and Siktesøya Island, Langesundsfjord, Porsgrunn Municipality in Telemark county. It occurs in serpentine altered dolomite in association with skarn enriched in tungsten, strontium, beryllium and boron in the Karelia occurrence and in vugs with natrolite and thomsonite in Norway.
