= Teruggite =

General
- Category: Nesoborates
- Formula: Ca_{4}MgAs_{2}B_{12}O_{22}(OH)_{12}·12H_{2}O
- IMA symbol: Tgg
- Strunz classification: 6.FA.25
- Crystal system: Monoclinic
- Crystal class: Prismatic (2/m) (same H-M symbol)
- Space group: P2_{1}/a

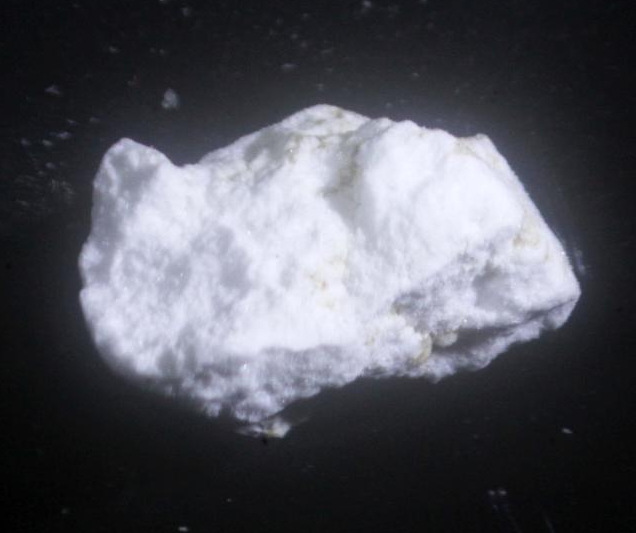
One white crystal group of the very rare arsenate-borate mineral teruggite from the TL in Loma Blanca, Argentina and only one of three known localities worldwide.

Teruggite is a mineral with the chemical formula Ca_{4}MgAs_{2}B_{12}O_{22}(OH)_{12}·12H_{2}O. It is colorless. Its crystals are monoclinic prismatic. It is transparent. It is not radioactive. It has vitreous luster. Teruggite is rated 2.5 on the Mohs Scale of hardness.
