= Santite =

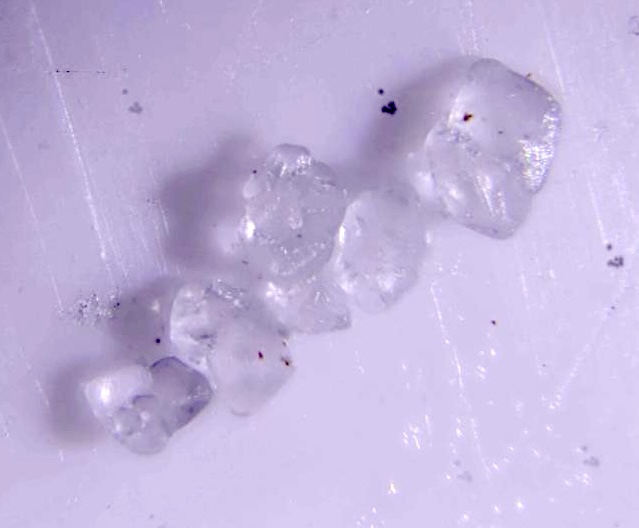
- Santite crystals

General
- Category: Nesoborates
- Formula: KB_{5}O_{8} · 4H_{2}O
- IMA symbol: Snt
- Strunz classification: 6.EA.10
- Crystal system: Orthorhombic
- Crystal class: Pyramidal (mm2); H-M symbol: (mm2)
- Space group: Aba2

Identification
- Color: Colourless
- Luster: Vitreous

Santite (KB_{5}O_{8}·4H_{2}O) is a hydrated borate mineral of potassium found in Tuscany, Italy. It is named for Georgi Santi (1746–1823), a former director of the Museum of Natural History, Italy.
