= Ulexite =

Mineral (hydrated sodium calcium borate hydroxide)

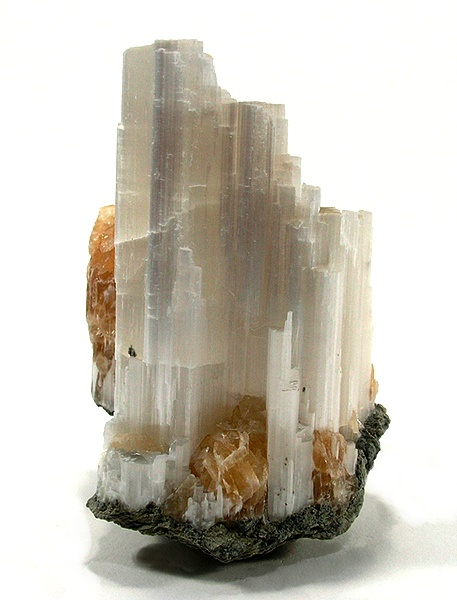
- Ulexite specimen from California

General
- Category: Nesoborates
- Formula: NaCaB_{5}O_{6}(OH)_{6}·5H_{2}O
- IMA symbol: Ulx
- Strunz classification: 6.EA.25
- Dana classification: 26.05.11.01
- Crystal system: Triclinic
- Crystal class: Pinacoidal (1̅) (same H–M symbol)
- Space group: P1̅
- Unit cell: a = 8.816(3) Å, b = 12.87 Å, c = 6.678(1) Å; α = 90.25°, β = 109.12°, γ = 105.1°; Z = 2

Identification
- Color: Colorless to white
- Crystal habit: Acicular to fibrous
- Twinning: Polysynthetic on {010} and {100}
- Cleavage: Perfect on {010} good on {11̅0} poor on {110}
- Fracture: Uneven
- Tenacity: Brittle
- Mohs scale hardness: 2.5
- Luster: Vitreous; silky or satiny in fibrous aggregates
- Streak: White
- Diaphaneity: Transparent to opaque
- Specific gravity: 1.95–1.96
- Optical properties: Biaxial (+)
- Refractive index: n_{α} = 1.491–1.496; n_{β} = 1.504–1.506; n_{γ} = 1.519–1.520
- Birefringence: δ = 0.028
- 2V angle: Measured: 73–78°
- Ultraviolet fluorescence: Depending on fluorescent impurities, ulexite may fluoresce yellow, greenish yellow, cream, white under short- and long-wave UV
- Solubility: Slightly soluble in water
- Other characteristics: Parallel fibrous masses can act as fiber-optical light pipes

Ulexite (/juːˈlɛksaɪt/), sometimes called TV rock or TV stone due to its unusual optical properties, is a hydrous borate hydroxide of sodium and calcium with the chemical formula NaCaB_{5}O_{6}(OH)_{6}·5H_{2}O. The mineral occurs as silky white rounded crystalline masses or in parallel fibers. Ulexite was named for the German chemist Georg Ludwig Ulex (1811–1883), who first discovered it.

The natural fibers of ulexite act as optical fibers, transmitting light along their long axes by internal reflection. When a piece of ulexite is cut with flat polished faces perpendicular to the orientation of the fibers, a good-quality specimen will display an image of whatever surface is adjacent to its other side. The fiber-optic effect is the result of the polarization of light into slow and fast rays within each fiber, the internal reflection of the slow ray and the refraction of the fast ray into the slow ray of an adjacent fiber. An interesting consequence is the generation of three cones, two of which are polarized, when a laser beam obliquely illuminates the fibers. These cones can be seen when viewing a light source through the mineral.

Ulexite is found in evaporite deposits, and the precipitated ulexite commonly forms a "cotton ball" tuft of acicular crystals. Ulexite is frequently found associated with colemanite, borax, meyerhofferite, hydroboracite, probertite, glauberite, trona, mirabilite, calcite, gypsum and halite. It is found principally in California and Nevada, US; Tarapacá Region in Chile, and Kazakhstan. Ulexite is also found in a vein-like bedding habit composed of closely packed fibrous crystals.

== History ==
Ulexite has been recognized as a valid mineral since 1840, after George Ludwig Ulex, for whom the mineral was named, provided the first chemical analysis of the mineral. In a footnote on p. 51, the editor claimed that Ulex's mineral actually was the same mineral that the American chemist Augustus Allen Hayes had found in Chile in 1844:

Es kann wohl keinem Zweifel unterworfen seyn, ... Boronatrocalcit umgeändert werden.

— It can surely be subject to no doubt that the mineral that was analyzed by the author is actually the hydroborocalcite of Hayes. One thus owes to Mr. Ulex knowledge of the true composition of this mineral. — The name "hydroborocalcite" could then perhaps be switched to the somewhat more correct "boronatrocalcite".,

In 1857, Henry How, a professor at King's College in Windsor, Nova Scotia, discovered borate minerals in the gypsum deposits of the Lower Carboniferous evaporate deposits in the Atlantic Provinces of Canada where he noted the presence of a fibrous borate that he termed natro-boro-calcite, which was actually ulexite (Papezik and Fong, 1975).

Murdoch examined the crystallography of ulexite in 1940. The crystallography was reworked in 1959 by Clark and Christ and their study also provided the first powder x-ray diffraction analysis of ulexite. In 1963 ulexite's remarkable fiber optics qualities were explained by Weichel-Moore and Potter. Their study highlighted the existence in nature of mineral structures exhibiting technologically required characteristics. Lastly, Clark and Appleman described the structure of ulexite correctly in 1964.

== Chemistry ==
Ulexite is a borate mineral because its formula (NaCaB_{5}O_{6}(OH)_{6}·5H_{2}O) contains boron and oxygen. The isolated borate polyanion [B_{5}O_{6}(OH)_{6}]^{3−} has five boron atoms, therefore placing ulexite in the pentaborate group.

Ulexite is a structurally complex mineral, with a basic structure containing chains of sodium, water and hydroxide octahedra. The chains are linked together by calcium, water, hydroxide and oxygen polyhedra and massive boron units. The boron units have a formula of [B_{5}O_{6}(OH)_{6}]^{3−} and a charge of −3. They are composed of three borate tetrahedra and two borate triangular groups.

Ulexite decomposes/dissolves in hot water.

== Morphology ==
Ulexite commonly forms small, rounded masses resembling cotton balls. Crystals are rare but will form fibrous, elongated crystals either oriented parallel or radial to each other. Crystals may also be acicular, resembling needles (Anthony et al., 2005). The point group of ulexite is 1, which means that the crystals show very little symmetry as there are no rotational axes or mirror planes. Ulexite is greatly elongated along [001]. The most common twinning plane is (010). Ulexite collected from the Flat Bay gypsum quarry in Newfoundland exhibits acicular "cotton balls" of crystals with a nearly square cross-section formed by the equal development of two pinacoids. The crystals are about 1–3 μm thick and 50–80 μm long, arranged in loosely packed, randomly oriented overlapping bundles (Papezik and Fong, 1975). In general, the crystals have six to eight faces with three to six terminal faces (Murdoch, 1940).

== Optical properties ==
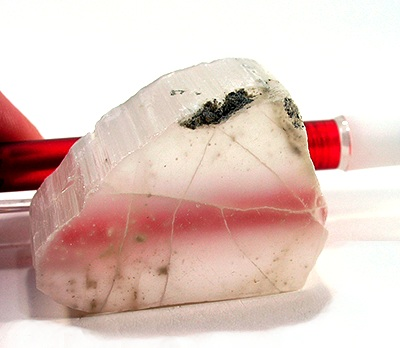
A fragment of ulexite displaying characteristic optical property

In 1956, John Marmon observed that fibrous aggregates of ulexite project an image of an object on the opposite surface of the mineral. This optical property is common for synthetic fibers, but not in minerals, giving ulexite the nickname "TV rock". According to Baur et al. (1957), this optical property is due to the reflections along twinned fibers, the most prominent twinning plane being on (010). The light is internally reflected over and over within each of the fibers that are surrounded by a medium of a lower refractive index (Garlick, 1991). This optical effect is also the result of the large spaces formed by the sodium octahedral chains in the mineral structure. Synthetic fibers used for fiber optics transmit images along a bundle of threadlike crystals the same way naturally occurring ulexite reproduces images due to the existence of different indices of refractions between fibers. Additionally, if the object is colored, all of the colors are reproduced by ulexite. Parallel surfaces of ulexite cut perpendicular to the fibers produce the best image, as distortion in the size of the projected image will occur if the surface is not parallel to the mineral. Curiously, in situ samples of ulexite are capable of producing a decent, rough image. Satin spar gypsum also exhibits this optical effect; however, the fibers are too coarse to transmit a decent image. The thickness of the fibers is proportional to the sharpness of the projected image.

Ulexite also displays concentric circles of light if held up to a bright light source, a strange optical property first observed by G. Donald Garlick (1991). This effect can also be produced by shining a laser pointer at a slightly oblique angle through a piece of ulexite. This optical behavior is a consequence of the different refractive indices of ulexite in different directions of polarization. Microscopic analysis of ulexite also yields cones of light that clearly emerge from each grain that is thicker than 0.1 mm under the Bertrand lens.

Ulexite is colorless and nonpleochroic in thin sections with low relief. Being triclinic, ulexite is optically biaxial. Interference figures yield addition on the concave side of the isogyres, causing ulexite to be biaxial positive. Ulexite has a high 2V that ranges between 73° – 78° and a maximum birefringence of up to 0.0300 (Anthony et al., 2005). According to Weichel-Moore and Potter (1963), the orientation of the fibers around the c-axis is completely random based on the variations in extinctions viewed under cross polarization. Ulexite displays polysynthetic twinning parallel to the elongation, along {010} and {100} (Murdoch, 1940). In thin sections cut parallel to the fibers, ulexite grains display both length-fast and length-slow orientations in equal quantities because the intermediate axis (y) of the indicatrix is roughly parallel to the elongation of the fibers along the crystallographic c-axis (Weichel-Moore and Potter, 1963).

== Structure ==
Ulexite crystals contain three structural groups, isolated pentaborate polyanions, calcium coordinated polyhedra, and sodium coordinated octahedra that are joined together and cross-linked by hydrogen bonding. The Ca-coordination polyhedra share edges to form chains which are separate from the Na-coordination octahedral chains. There are 16 distinct hydrogen bonds that have an average distance of 2.84 Å. Boron is coordinated to four oxygens in a tetrahedra arrangement and also to three oxygens in a triangular arrangement with average distances of 1.48 and 1.37 Å, respectively. Each Ca^{2+} cation is surrounded by a polyhedron of eight oxygen atoms. The average distance between calcium and oxygen is 2.48 Å. Each Na^{+} is coordinated by an octahedron of two hydroxyl oxygens and four water molecules, with an average distance of 2.42 Å (Clark and Appleman 1964). The octahedral and polyhedral chains parallel to c, the elongate direction, cause the fibrous habit of ulexite and the fiber optical properties.

== Significance ==
Boron is a trace element within the lithosphere that has an average concentration of 10 ppm, although large areas of the world are boron deficient. Boron is never found in the elemental state in nature, however boron naturally occurs in over 150 minerals. The three most important minerals from a worldwide commercial standpoint based on abundance are tincal (also known as borax), ulexite, and colemanite (Ekmekyaper et al., 2008). High concentrations of economically significant boron minerals generally occur in arid areas that have a history of volcanism. Ulexite is mined predominantly from the Borax mine in Boron, California.

The boron concentration of ulexite is commercially significant because boron compounds are used in producing materials for many branches of industry. Boron is primarily used in the manufacturing of fiberglass along with heat-resistant borosilicate glasses such as traditional PYREX, car headlights, and laboratory glassware. Borosilicate glass is desirable because adding B_{2}O_{3} lowers the expansion coefficient, therefore increasing the thermal shock resistance of the glass. Boron and its compounds are also common ingredients in soaps, detergents, and bleaches, which contributes to the softening of hard water by attracting calcium ions. Boron usage in alloy and metal production has been increasing because of its excellent metal oxide solubilizing ability. Boron compounds are used as a reinforcing agent in order to harden metals for use in military tanks and armor. Boron is used extensively for fire retardant materials. Boron is an essential element for plant growth and is frequently used as a fertilizer, however in large concentrations boron can be toxic, and therefore boron is a common ingredient in herbicides and insecticides. Boron is also found in chemicals used to treat wood and as protective coatings and pottery glazes. Additionally when ulexite is dissolved in a solution of carbonate, calcium carbonate forms as a by-product. This by-product is used in large amounts by the pulp and paper industry as a paper filler and as a coating for paper that allows for improved printability (Demirkiran and Kunkul, 2011). Recently, as more attention is being given to obtaining new sources of energy, the use of hydrogen as a fuel for cars has come to the forefront. The compound sodium borohydride (NaBH_{4}) is currently being considered as an excellent hydrogen storage medium due to its high theoretical hydrogen yield by weight for future use in cars. Piskin (2009) validates that the boron concentration in ulexite can be used as the boron source or the starting material in the synthesis of sodium borohydride (NaBH_{4}).

== Related minerals ==
Borate minerals are rare because their main component, boron, makes up less than 10 ppm (10 mg/kg) of Earth's crust. Because boron is a trace element, the majority of borate minerals occur only in one specific geologic environment: geologically active intermontane basins. Borates are formed when boron bearing solutions, caused from the leaching of pyroclastic rocks, flow into isolated basins where evaporation then takes place. Over time, borates deposit and form into stratified layers. Ulexite occurs in salt playas and dry saline lakes in association with large-scale gypsum deposits and Na-Ca borates. There are no known polymorphs of ulexite nor does ulexite form a solid solution series with any other minerals.

According to Stamatakis et al. (2009) Na, Ca, and Na-Ca borates are found in relation to ulexite. These minerals are:

- Borax Na_{2}B_{4}O_{7}·10H_{2}O
- Colemanite Ca_{2}B_{8}O_{11}·5H_{2}O
- Howlite Ca_{2}B_{5}SiO_{9}[OH]_{5}
- Kernite Na_{2}[B_{4}O_{6}(OH)_{2}·3H_{2}O]
- Meyerhofferite Ca_{2}B_{6}O_{6}(OH)_{10}·2H_{2}O
- Probertite NaCaB_{5}O_{9}·5H_{2}O

More common minerals that are not borates, but also form in evaporite deposits are:

- Calcite CaCO_{3}
- Gypsum CaSO_{4}·2H_{2}O
- Halite NaCl

== See also ==
- List of minerals
- List of minerals named after people
- Fiberscope – Flexible optical fiber bundle with an eyepiece on one end and a lens on the other
