= Sussexite =

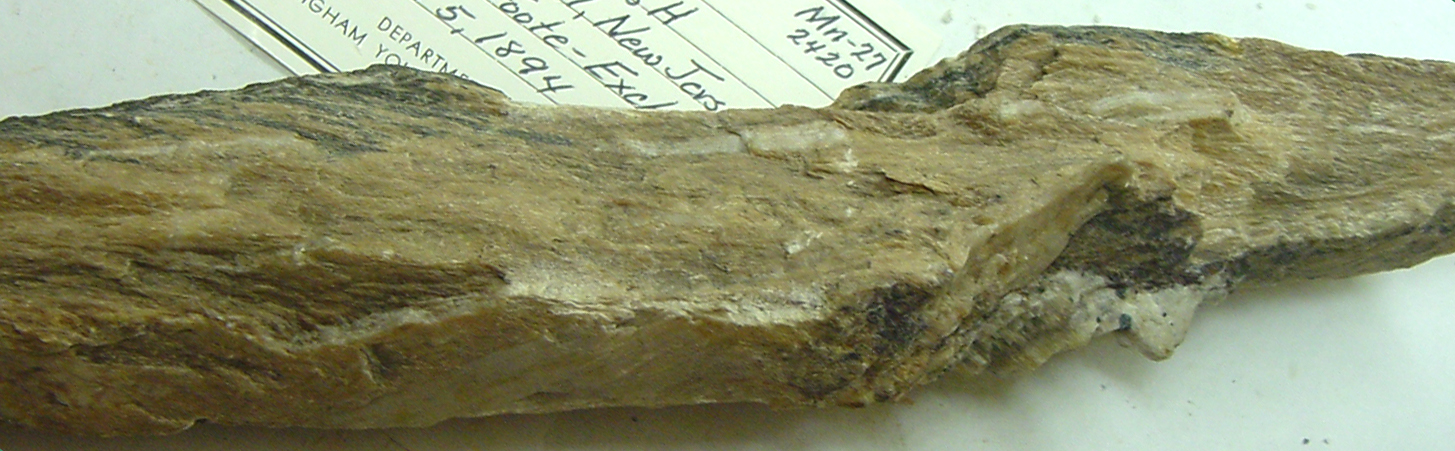
- Sussexite from Mine Hill, New Jersey

General
- Category: Nesoborates
- Formula: MnBO_{2}(OH)
- IMA symbol: Ssx
- Strunz classification: 6.BA.15
- Crystal system: Monoclinic
- Crystal class: Prismatic (2/m) (same H-M symbol)
- Space group: P2_{1}/c

Identification
- Color: White to buff, lilac/lavender, pale pink, colorless in transmitted light
- Crystal habit: As bladed acicular crystals, to 7 mm; cross-vein or radial fibrous, in felted or matted aggregates, nodular.
- Luster: Silky, dull(earthy)
- Specific gravity: 3.30

Sussexite is a manganese borate mineral MnBO_{2}(OH). Crystals are monoclinic prismatic and typically fibrous in occurrence. Colour is white, pink, yellowish white with a pearly lustre. It has a Mohs hardness of 3 and a specific gravity of 3.12.

It is named after the Franklin Mining District in Sussex County, New Jersey, US where it was first discovered in 1868.

Sussexite also occurs in France, Italy, Namibia, North Korea, South Africa, Switzerland, and the US states of Michigan, New Jersey, Utah and Virginia.
