= Wilhelm Meyerhoffer =

German chemist (1864–1906)

- Born: September 13, 1864
- Died: April 21, 1906 (aged 41)

Wilhelm Meyerhoffer (13 September 1864 – 21 April 1906) was a German chemist.

Meyerhoffer studied chemistry and worked with Jacobus Henricus van 't Hoff at the University of Amsterdam and the University of Berlin.

The mineral Meyerhofferite is named after him.
