= Hilgardite =

Borate mineral

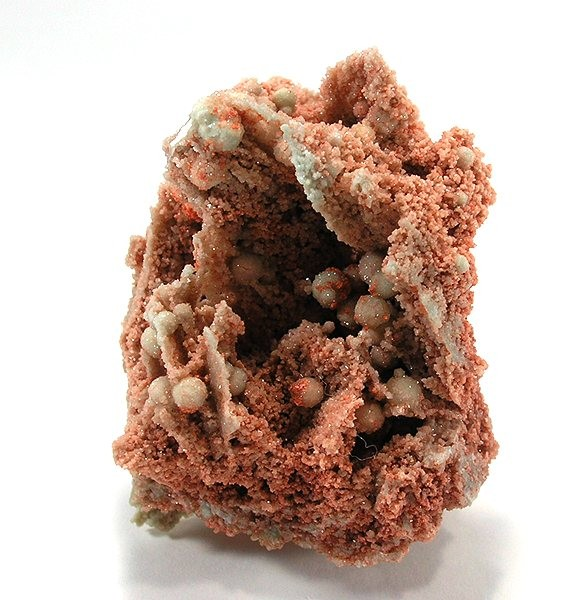
- Microcrystalline red-orange hilgardite encasing white boracite, from Boulby Mine, Loftus, North Yorkshire, England. Size: 5.5 × 4.5 × 3.4 cm.

General
- Category: Tektoborates
- Formula: Ca_{2}B_{5}O_{9}Cl·H_{2}O
- IMA symbol: Hgr
- Strunz classification: 6.ED.05
- Crystal system: Triclinic
- Crystal class: Pedial (1) (same H-M symbol)
- Space group: P1
- Unit cell: a = 6.297, b = 6.464 c = 6.565 [Å]; α = 74.24° β = 61.68°, γ = 61.26°; Z = 1

Identification
- Color: Colorless, light pink to reddish brown
- Crystal habit: Tabular triangular crystals
- Cleavage: {010}, perfect; {100}, good
- Fracture: Conchoidal
- Mohs scale hardness: 5
- Luster: Vitreous
- Streak: White
- Diaphaneity: Transparent to translucent
- Specific gravity: 2.67–2.71
- Optical properties: Biaxial (+)
- Refractive index: n_{α} = 1.630 n_{β} = 1.636 n_{γ} = 1.664
- Birefringence: δ = 0.034
- 2V angle: Measured: 35°
- Other characteristics: Piezoelectric

Hilgardite is a borate mineral with the chemical formula Ca_{2}B_{5}O_{9}Cl·H_{2}O. It is transparent and has vitreous luster. It is colorless to light pink with a white streak. It is rated 5 on the Mohs Scale. It crystallizes in the triclinic crystal system. Crystals occur as distorted tabular triangles and are hemimorphic, polytypes exist.

It was named for geologist Eugene W. Hilgard (1833–1916). It was first described in 1937 for an occurrence in the Choctaw Salt Dome of Iberville Parish, Louisiana, US. It occurs as an uncommon accessory mineral in evaporite deposits and salt domes worldwide. In addition to the type locality it has been reported in Wayne County, Mississippi and in the Louann Salt Formation, Clarke County, Alabama in the United States and at the Penobsquis and Salt Springs evaporites, near Sussex, New Brunswick, Canada. In Europe it is reported from the Konigshall-Hindenburg potash mine near Göttingen, Lower Saxony, Germany and in the Boulby potash mine, Whitby, Yorkshire, England. In Asia it is reported from the Chelkar salt dome, Uralsk district, Kazakhstan; the Ilga Basin, eastern Siberia, Russia and the Sedom Formation, Mount Sedom, Dead Sea, Israel.

== See also ==
- List of minerals named after people
- List of minerals
