= Jeremejevite =

Aluminium borate mineral with variable fluoride and hydroxide ions

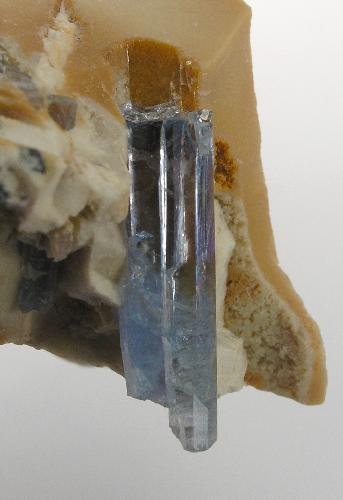

General
- Category: Borate mineral
- Formula: Al_{6}B_{5}O_{15}(F,OH)_{3}
- IMA symbol: Jer
- Strunz classification: 6.AB.15
- Crystal system: Hexagonal
- Crystal class: Dipyramidal class (6/m); H-M symbol: (6/m)
- Space group: P6_{3}/m

Identification
- Color: Colorless, white, yellowish, blue, light yellow brown, aquamarine blue, rarely violet; colourless in transmitted light
- Crystal habit: Prismatic
- Cleavage: None observed
- Fracture: Conchoidal
- Mohs scale hardness: 6.5 – 7.5
- Luster: Vitreous
- Streak: White
- Diaphaneity: Transparent
- Specific gravity: 3.28 – 3.31
- Optical properties: Uniaxial (-)
- Refractive index: n_{ω} = 1.653 n_{ε} = 1.640
- Birefringence: 0.0130
- Pleochroism: Colorless – light blue-violet
- Other characteristics: Piezoelectric

Jeremejevite is an aluminium borate mineral with variable fluoride and hydroxide ions. Its chemical formula is Al_{6}B_{5}O_{15}(F,OH)_{3}. It is considered as one of the rarest, thus one of the most expensive stones. For nearly a century, it was considered as one of the rarest gemstones in the world.

It was first described in 1883 as small, single crystals in loose granitic debris in Mt. Soktui, Nerschinsk district, Adun-Chilon Mountains, Siberia. It was named after Pavel Vladimirovich Eremeev, Russian mineralogist, engineer and professor, who collected the first specimens (Jeremejev, German; 1830–1899).

== Properties ==
Jeremejevite is a mineral that shows pleochroic properties, which is an optical phenomenon in which the mineral's color appears to change depending on the angle at which it is viewed. Blue specimens from Namibia show a light cornflower blue to colorless to light yellow pleochroism, while yellow materials show light yellow to colorless pleochroism. This mineral is also piezoelectric, meaning that it would generate electricity when under mechanical stress.

== Mining and localities ==
Jeremejevite occurs as a late hydrothermal phase in granitic pegmatites in association with albite, tourmaline, quartz and rarely gypsum. It has also been reported in the Pamir Mountains of Tajikistan, Namibia and in micro-crystalline form at the Eifel district, Germany. It was first found in facetable form in Namibia, which were blue-green pyramidal crystals up to 2 cm (0.79 in). Later, there was a new source revealed in Namibia, near Usakos in 2001. Nowadays, most of the stones on the market are from that deposit.

== Jewelry industry ==
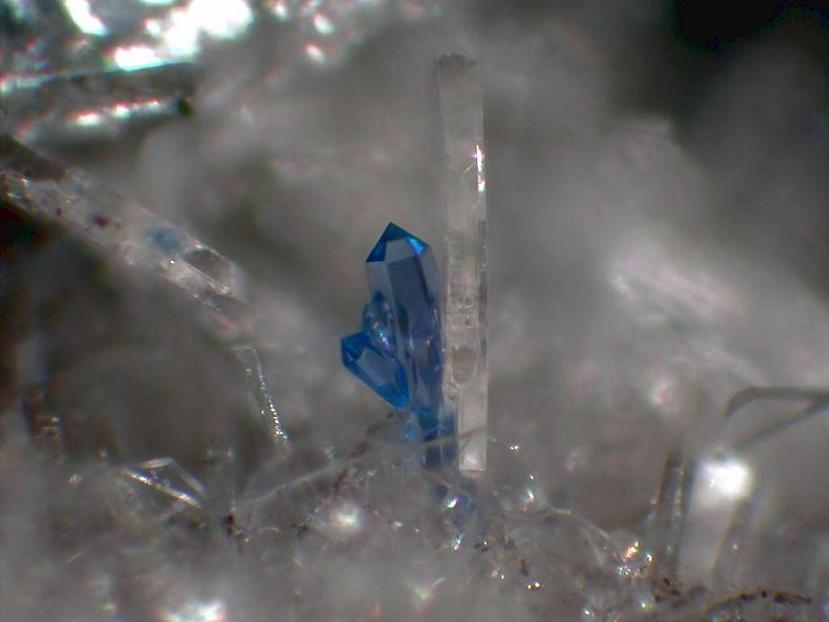
Blue jeremejevite in rare, clear crystal form. Image width: 1.5 mm (0.059 in).

As an OH-end member, scientists have been able to synthesize jeremejevite, but only in micro-crystalline form, without fluorine. This synthesized variant of the mineral has no use in the jewelry industry.

Typically, faceted gems can reach up to 5 carats, but usually they range between less than 1 carat and 2 carats. However, new sources produced much larger faceted stones, the biggest faceted gem weighing 254 carats. This gem was found in Sri Lanka in 1990.

Even though jeremejevite is a relatively durable stone, it should not be cleaned using ultrasound cleaning or steaming; the stone usually contains liquid inclusions, which could shatter the stone if cleaned using these methods. It is recommended to clean them with warm water, a mild detergent, and a soft brush instead.

Due to its high value and rarity, it is considered a collectors' stone, who purchase it in mineral form, hence only a few specimens had been faceted so far.
