= Painite =

Borate mineral

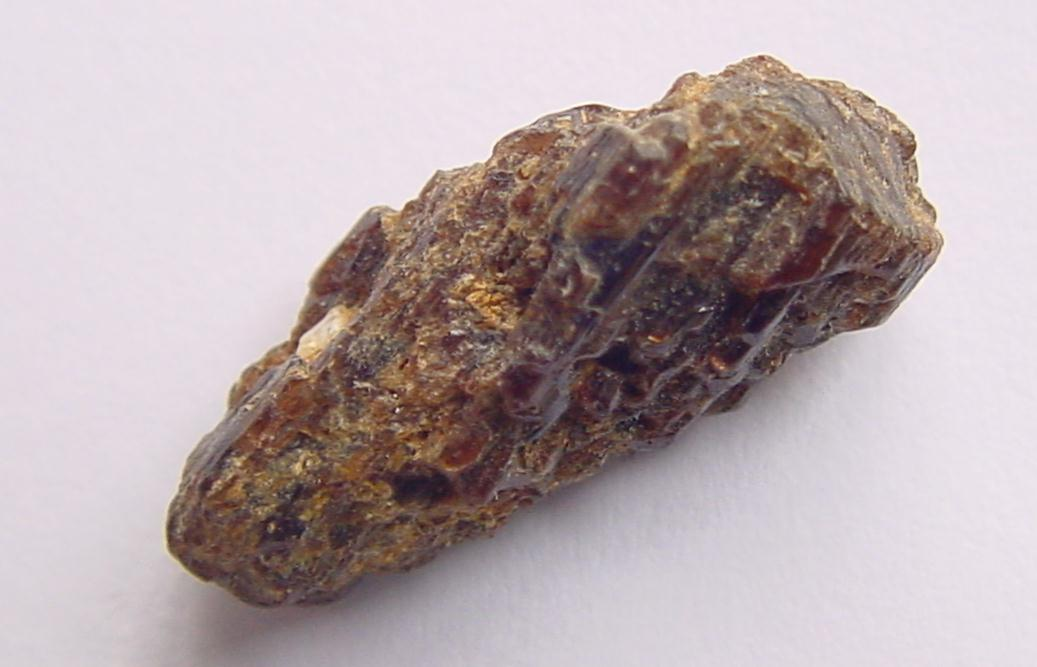
- Painite from Myanmar, 2 cm long

General
- Category: Borate minerals
- Formula: CaZrAl_{9}O_{15}(BO_{3})
- IMA symbol: Pai
- Strunz classification: 6.AB.85
- Dana classification: 7.5.2.1
- Crystal system: Hexagonal
- Crystal class: Dipyramidal (6/m) (same H-M symbol), although earlier reported as hexagonal (6)
- Space group: P6_{3}/m
- Unit cell: a = 8.72 Å, c = 8.46 Å; Z = 2

Identification
- Color: Red, brownish, orange-red
- Crystal habit: Elongated crystals, pseudo-orthorhombic
- Mohs scale hardness: 7.5 – 8
- Luster: Vitreous
- Streak: Red
- Diaphaneity: Transparent
- Specific gravity: 4.01
- Optical properties: Uniaxial (-)
- Refractive index: n_{o} = 1.8159, n_{e} = 1.7875
- Pleochroism: Ruby-red parallel to [0001]; pale brownish orange or pale red-orange at right angles to [0001]
- Solubility: Insoluble in acids

Painite is a rare borate mineral. It was first found in Myanmar by British mineralogist and gem dealer Arthur C.D. Pain who misidentified it as ruby, until it was discovered as a new gemstone in the 1950s. When it was confirmed as a new mineral species, the mineral was named after him.

The chemical makeup of painite contains calcium, zirconium, boron, aluminium, and oxygen (CaZrAl_{9}O_{15}(BO_{3})). The mineral also contains trace amounts of chromium and vanadium, which are responsible for Painite's typically orange-red to brownish-red color, similar to topaz. The mineral's rarity is due to zirconium and boron rarely interacting with each other in nature. The crystals are naturally hexagonal, but may also be euhedral or orthorhombic. They also may have no crystalline structure, but usually are accompanied by a crystalline structure. Until late 2004, only two had been cut into faceted gemstones.

== Discovery and occurrence ==
Extensive exploration in the area surrounding Mogok, which comprises a large part of the extremely small region the mineral is known to exist in, has identified several new painite occurrences that have been vigorously explored resulting in several thousand new available painite specimens.

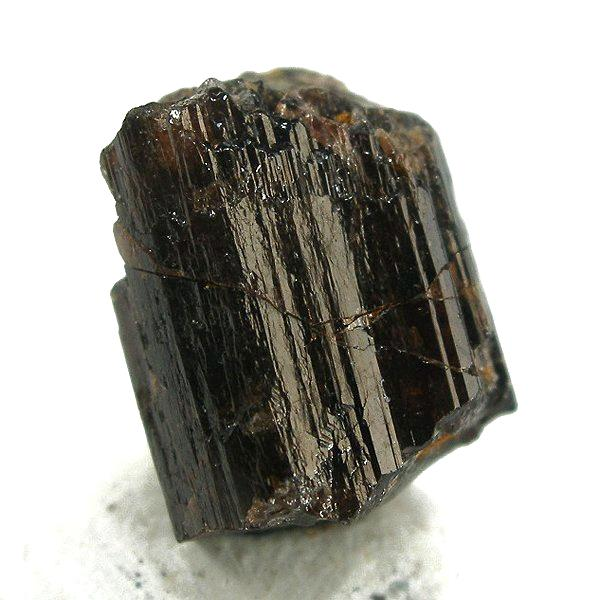
Striated, euhedral painite crystal (size: 0.9×0.8×0.7 cm)

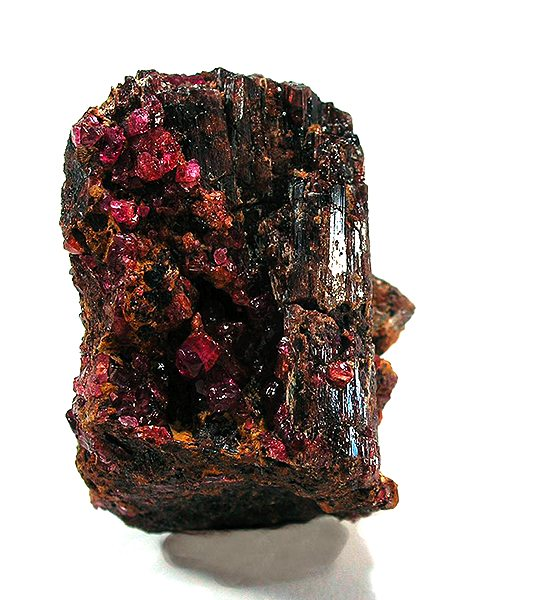
Corundum var. ruby on a large painite crystal, Mogok, Burma. (size: 3.7×3.1×2.3 cm)

== See also ==
- List of minerals
