= Calciborite =

Inoborate mineral

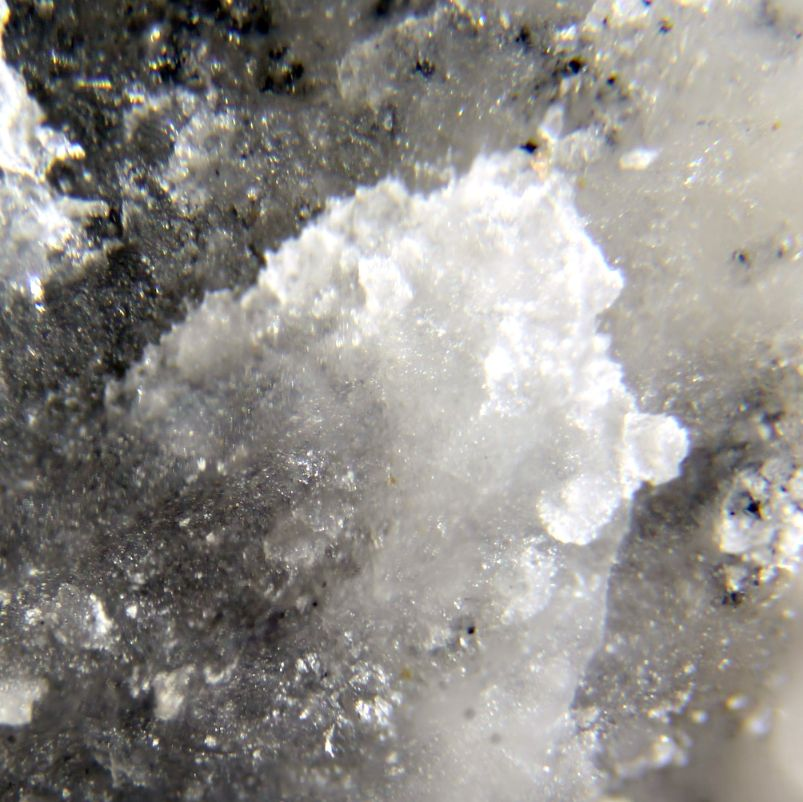
- White crystals of calciborite from the type locality in Russia (Novofrolovskoye Deposit)

General
- Category: Inoborates
- Formula: CaB_{2}O_{4}
- IMA symbol: Cbo
- Strunz classification: 6.BC.10
- Crystal system: Orthorhombic
- Crystal class: Dipyramidal (mmm); H-M symbol: (2/m 2/m 2/m)
- Space group: Pccn
- Unit cell: a = 8.38 Å, b = 13.82 Å, c = 5.00 Å; Z = 8

Identification
- Formula mass: 125.70 g/mol
- Color: White
- Crystal habit: Prismatic crystals and radial clusters
- Cleavage: None
- Fracture: Conchoidal to uneven
- Mohs scale hardness: 3.5
- Luster: Vitreous
- Streak: White
- Diaphaneity: Translucent
- Specific gravity: 2.878
- Optical properties: Biaxial (-)
- Refractive index: n_{α} = 1.595 n_{β} = 1.654 n_{γ} = 1.670
- Birefringence: δ = 0.075
- 2V angle: Measured: 54°

Calciborite, CaB_{2}O_{4}, is a rare calcium borate mineral.

It was first described in 1955 in the Novofrolovskoye copper–boron deposit, near Krasnoturinsk, Turinsk district, Northern Ural Mountains, Russia. It occurs in a skarn deposit formed in limestone adjacent to a quartz diorite intrusive. It occurs associated with: sibirskite (another rare calcium borate mineral), calcite, dolomite, garnet, magnetite and pyroxene. It has also been reported from the Fuka mine of Okayama Prefecture, Japan.
