= Priceite =

White borate mineral

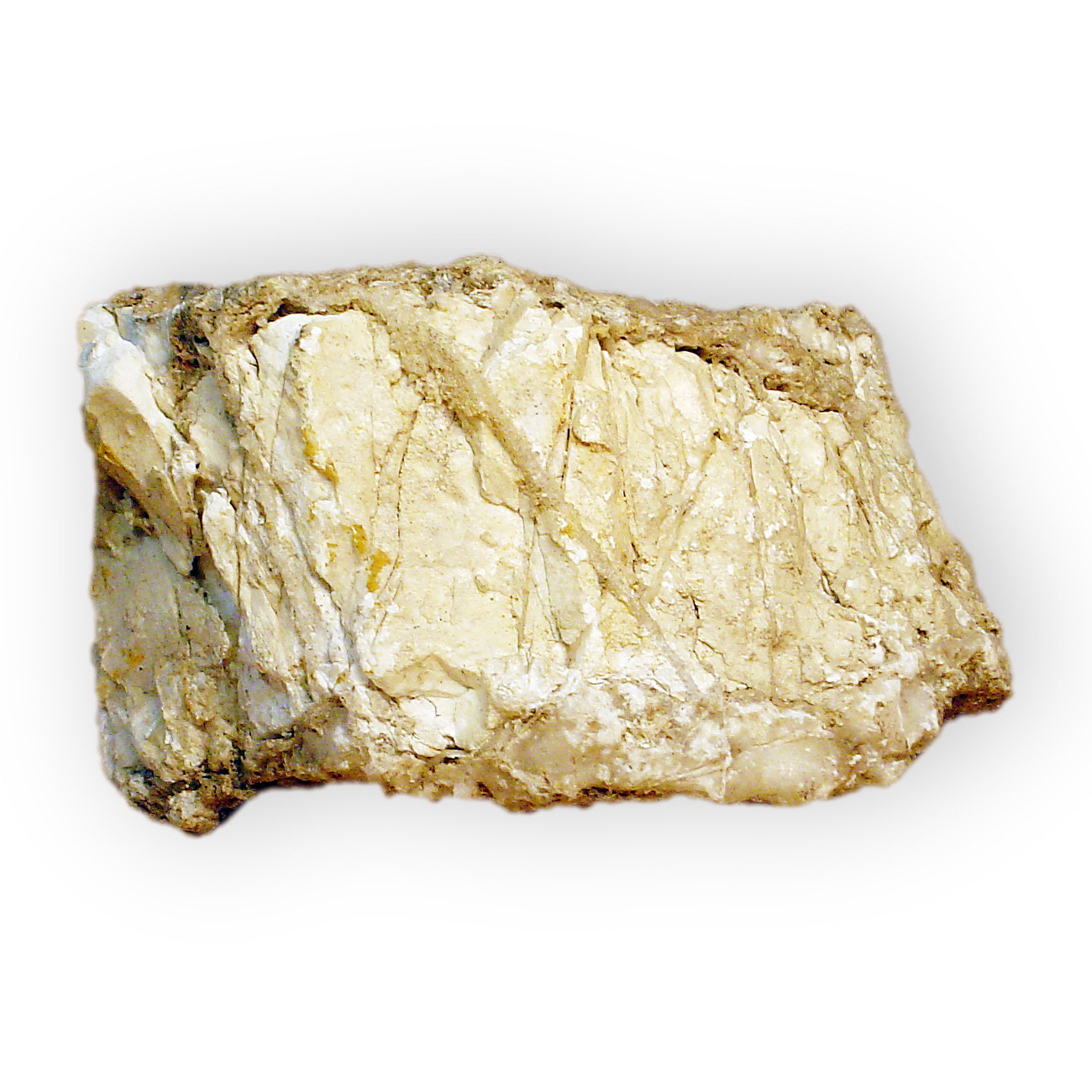

General
- Category: Minerals
- Formula: Ca_{2}B_{5}O_{7}(OH)_{5}·H_{2}O
- IMA symbol: Pce
- Crystal system: Monoclinic

Identification
- Color: White; colourless in transmitted light
- Mohs scale hardness: 3

Priceite is a white borate mineral. The mineral has been found in places such as Chetco, Oregon, Death Valley, and northwestern Turkey. In 1862 small amounts of this mineral were mined from Chetco, Oregon.

Priceite is rare and has only been found in a few ores. It is related to colemanite.

== Name and etymology ==
The mineral is named after Thomas Price who is the first to study the mineral. The mineral's former name was pandermite after the Panderma area in Turkey.
