= Azoproite =

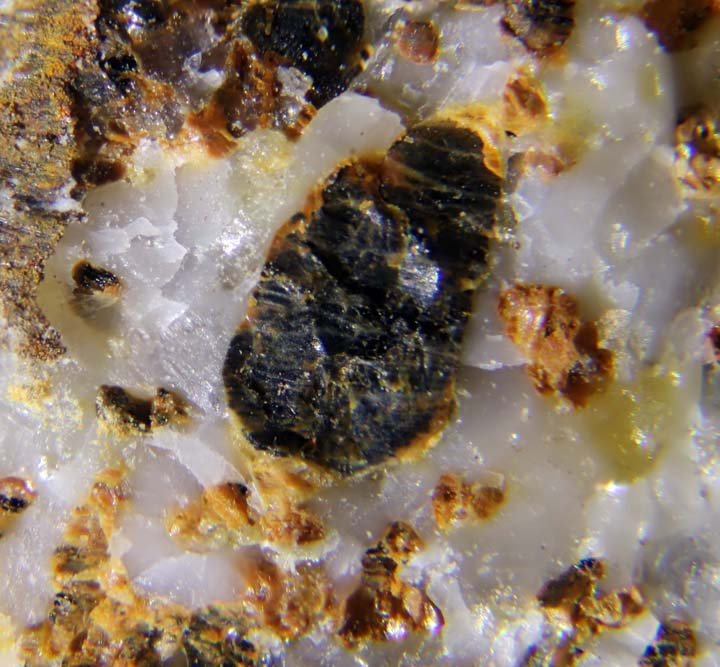
- Rare azoproite crystals

General
- Category: Borate mineral
- Formula: (Mg,Fe^{2+})_{2}(Fe^{3+},Ti,Mg)(BO_{3})O_{2}
- IMA symbol: Azo
- Crystal system: Orthorhombic

Identification
- Color: Black
- Cleavage: Distinct/Good; Good on (010), less good on (001)
- Fracture: Conchoidal
- Tenacity: Brittle
- Mohs scale hardness: 5.5
- Luster: Adamantine

Azoproite is a rare manganese iron borate mineral with the chemical formula (Mg,Fe^{2+})_{2}(Fe^{3+},Ti,Mg)(BO_{3})O_{2}. It was first identified near Lake Baikal, Russia. It was named after the Association pour l'Etude Géologique des Zones Profondes de l'Ecorce Terrestre, whose acronym is AZOPRO in French.
