= Henmilite =

Rare blue crystal

Henmilite is a rare borate mineral with a formula Ca_{2}Cu[B(OH)_{4}]_{2}(OH)_{4}_{.} It has a blue-violet shade and occurs as anhedral masses and rarely small crystals.

== Discovery ==
In 1981, two researchers from the Department of Earth Science, Okayama University named Kitinosuke Henmi (逸見 吉之助) and Dr. Chiyoko Henmi (逸見 千代子) were surveying Fuka Mine in the Okayama Prefecture. While doing research they observed small, dark blue crystals forming off of Pentahydroborite. Further study indicated that this was a newly discovered Borate Mineral, the first of which to contain traces of both Copper and Calcium.

The mineral's name and recognition were officially approved by the International Mineralogical Association that same year.
