= Aksaite =

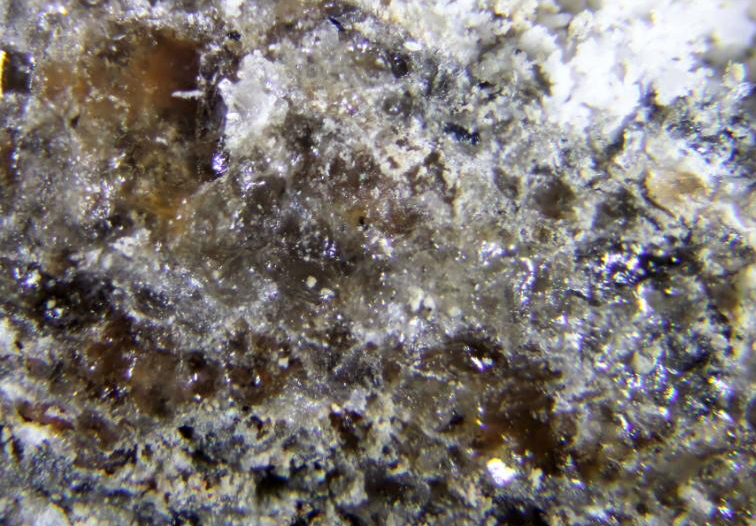
- Pale grey crystals of aksaite

General
- Category: Nesoborates
- Formula: Mg[B_{6}O_{7}(OH)_{6}]·2H_{2}O
- IMA symbol: Aks
- Strunz classification: 6.FA.05
- Dana classification: 26.6.4.1
- Crystal system: Orthorhombic; Dipyramidal class
- Space group: Orthorhombic; H-M symbol: (2/m 2/m 2/m); Space group: Pbca

Identification
- Color: Colorless, white to pale grey
- Cleavage: Distinct/Good; Probable on {100} and {010}
- Mohs scale hardness: 2.5
- Streak: White
- Diaphaneity: Transparent to translucent
- Optical properties: Biaxial (−)
- Birefringence: δ = 0.055
- 2V angle: Measured = 88°; Calculated = 78°
- Dispersion: None

Aksaite (Mg[B_{6}O_{7}(OH)_{6}]·2H_{2}O) is a mineral found in Kazakhstan.

== Etymology and History ==
Aksaite is named after the place it was discovered, Ak-say (lit. White Glen). It was found in 1963 in Chelkar Salt Dome, Ak-say Valley, Kazakhstan.
