= Fabianite =

Borate mineral

General
- Category: Phylloborates
- Formula: CaB_{3}O_{5}(OH)
- IMA symbol: Fbn
- Strunz classification: 6.FC.20
- Crystal system: Monoclinic
- Crystal class: Prismatic (2/m) (same H-M symbol)
- Space group: P2_{1}/a

Fabianite is a borate mineral with the chemical formula CaB_{3}O_{5}(OH). It is colorless and leaves a white streak. Its crystals are monoclinic prismatic. It is transparent and fluorescent. It has vitreous luster. It is not radioactive. Fabianite is rated 6 on the Mohs Scale. It was named for Hans-Joachim Fabian, a German geologist.

== See also ==
- List of minerals
