= Takedaite =

General
- Category: Borate
- Formula: Ca_{3}B_{2}O_{6}
- IMA symbol: Tkd
- Strunz classification: 6.AA.40
- Crystal system: Trigonal
- Crystal class: 3̅m
- Space group: R3̅c
- Unit cell: a = 8.638 Å, c = 11.850 Å

Identification
- Formula mass: 237.85 gm
- Color: white, pale gray
- Crystal habit: Granular
- Cleavage: {110} imperfect
- Fracture: Brittle
- Mohs scale hardness: 4.5
- Luster: Vitreous
- Streak: white
- Density: 3.10 g/cm^{3}
- Optical properties: uniaxial negative
- Refractive index: ω=1.726, ε=1.630
- Ultraviolet fluorescence: non-fluorescent
- Absorption spectra: 4000 to 250cm^{−1}
- Solubility: easily soluble in dilute hydrochloric acid

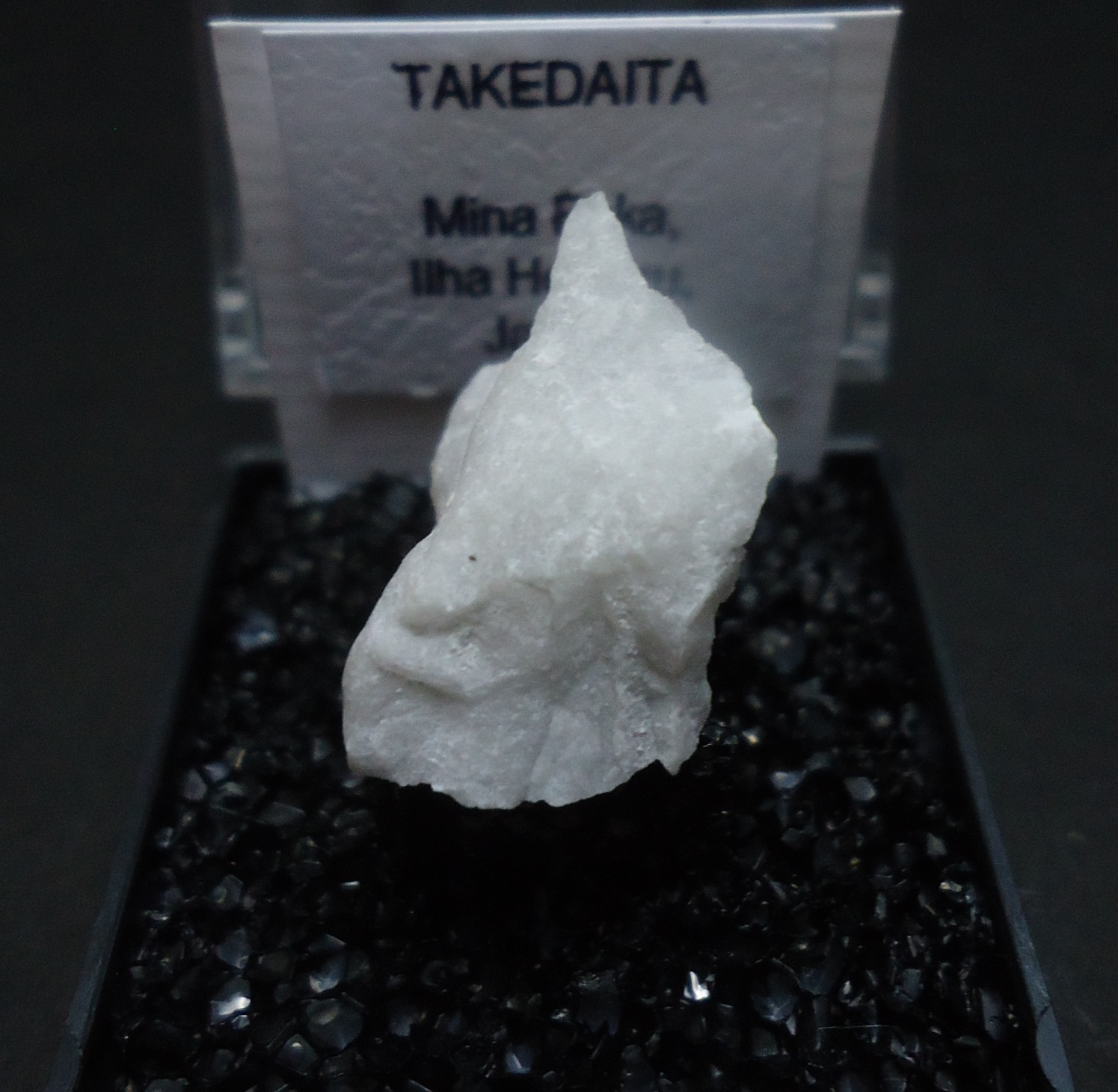

Takedaite is a borate mineral that was found in a mine in Fuka, Okayama Prefecture Japan during a mineralogical survey in the year 1994. During the survey, Kusachi and Henmi reported the occurrence of an unidentified anhydrous borate mineral closely associated with nifontovite, olshanskyite, and calcite. By the year 1994 two other minerals in the borate group M_{3}B_{2}O_{6} had been identified in nature Mg_{3}B_{2}O_{6} known as kotoite and Mn_{3}B_{2}O_{6} known as jimboite. Takedaite has the ideal chemical formula of Ca_{3}B_{2}O_{6}. The mineral has been approved by the Commission on New Minerals and Mineral Names, IMA, to be named takedaite after Hiroshi Takeda, a professor at the Mineralogical Institute, University of Tokyo Japan.

== Occurrence ==
Takedaite is found in association with gehlenite, spurrite, bicchulite, rankinite, kilchoanite, oyelite, and fukalite. It occurs in a vein consisting of borate minerals that developed along the boundary between crystalline limestone and the skarns. The vein it was discovered in was approximately 10 cm in thickness and is closely associated with frolovite and calcite. At the circumference of the expanded area, hydrous borates such as nifontovite, olshanskyite, sibirskite, and pentahydroborite occurred 20 cm to 50 cm in thickness.

== Physical properties ==
Takedaite is a white, or pale gray mineral with a vitreous luster and colorless in thin sections. It exhibits a hardness of 4.5 on the Mohs hardness scale. The density measured by heavy liquids was 3.10(2) g•cm^{−3}, the calculated density being 3.11 g•cm^{−3}.

== Optical properties ==
Takedaite is optically uniaxial Negative. The refractive indices are: ω = 1.726, ε = 1.630, and the Vickers microhardness was 478(429-503) kg mm^{−2} (25g load). The infrared spectrum of Takedaite measured by the KBr method for the region 4000 to 250 cm^{−1}. The absorption bands at 907, 795, 710, and 618 cm^{−1} were in close agreement with those of the synthetic 3CaO·B_{2}O_{3} reported by Wier and Schroeder (1964). The absorption bands at 1275 and 1230 cm^{−1} for takedaite were sharper.

== Chemical properties ==
Takedaite is a borate with the presence of calcium, boron and oxygen. Chemical analysis gave CaO 71.13%, B_{2}O_{3} 28.41%, the H_{2}O content was determined by ignition loss at 900 °C and was 0.14%, totaling 99.68%. The empirical formula calculated on the basis of O=6 is therefore Ca_{3.053}B_{1.965}O_{6} or more ideally Ca_{3}B_{2}O_{6}. Takedaite is also easily soluble in dilute hydrochloric acid.

== Chemical composition ==
Oxide	wt%
CaO	71.13
B_{2}O_{3}	28.41
LOI	0.14
Total	99.68

== X-ray crystallography ==
The x-ray powder data for takedaite was obtained by an X-ray diffractometer using Ni-filtered Cu-Κα radiation. Single crystals were also studied using the precession and Weissenberg methods. Takedaite is in the trigonal crystal system. The space group is either R3̅c or R3c. The unit cell dimensions, refined by least squares from the X-ray powder diffraction data of takedaite, were: a = 8.638(1) Å, c = 11.850(2) Å.

== See also ==
- List of Minerals
