= Admontite =

Borate mineral

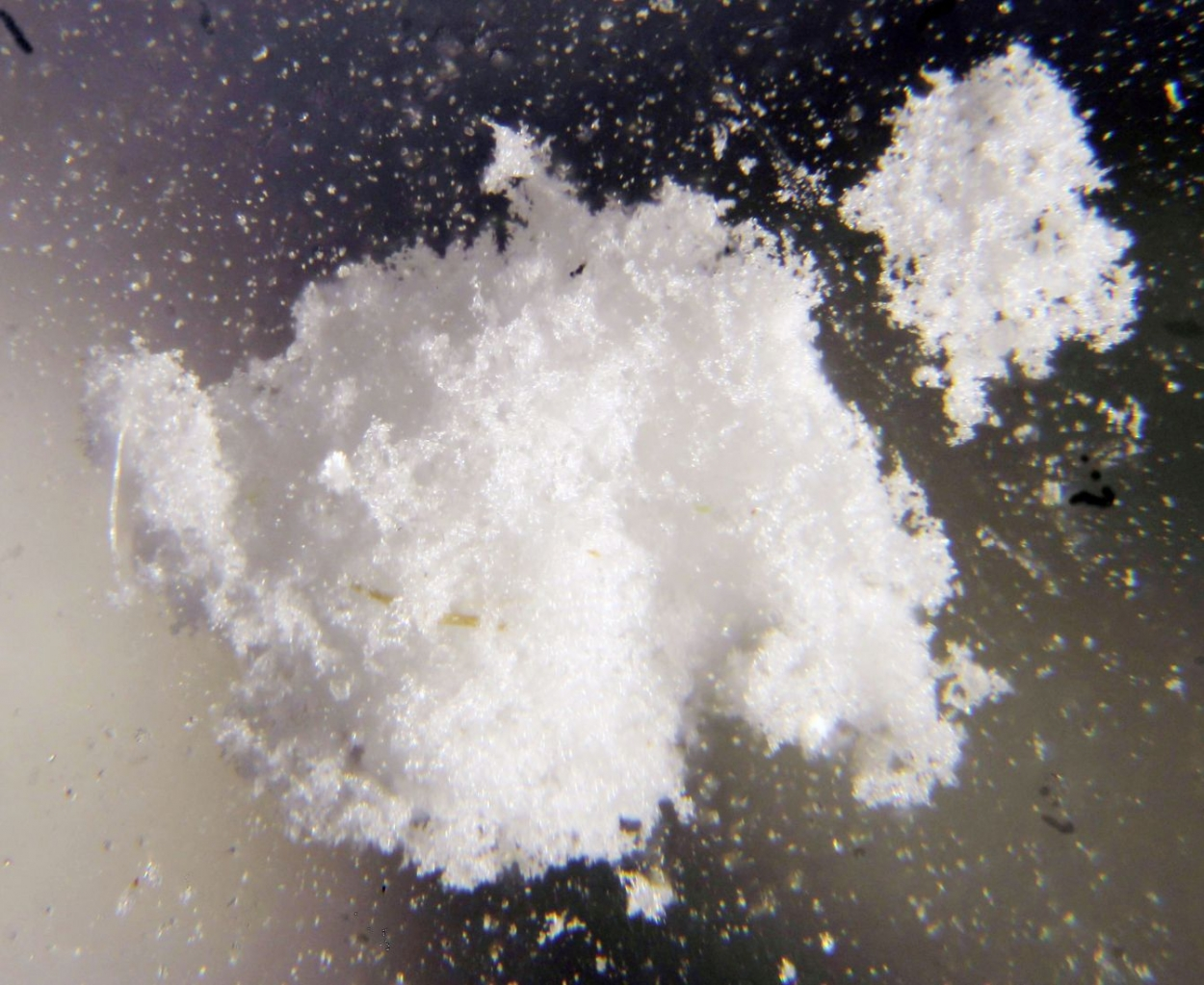

General
- Category: Nesoborates
- Formula: MgB_{6}O_{10}·7H_{2}O or MgB_{6}O_{7}(OH)_{6}·4H_{2}O
- IMA symbol: Amt
- Strunz classification: 6.FA.15
- Dana classification: 26.6.3.1
- Crystal system: Monoclinic
- Crystal class: Prismatic (2/m) (same H-M symbol)
- Space group: P2_{1}/c

Identification
- Color: colorless
- Cleavage: Absent
- Fracture: Conchoidal - Fractures developed in brittle materials characterized by smoothly curving surfaces, (e.g. quartz)
- Mohs scale hardness: 2 - 3 - Gypsum-Calcite
- Streak: White
- Density: 1.82 - 1.87, Average = 1.84
- Optical properties: Biaxial (−)
- Refractive index: n_{α} = 1.442 n_{γ} = 1.504
- Birefringence: δ = 0.062
- Dispersion: None

Admontite is a hydrated magnesium borate mineral with formula MgB_{6}O_{10}·7H_{2}O.

Occurrence - In a gypsum deposit. Associations: gypsum, anhydrite, hexahydrite, löweite, eugsterite, pyrite, quartz.

It is named after Admont, Austria. Its Mohs scale rating is 2 to 3.

== See also ==
- List of minerals
