= Karlite =

Borate mineral

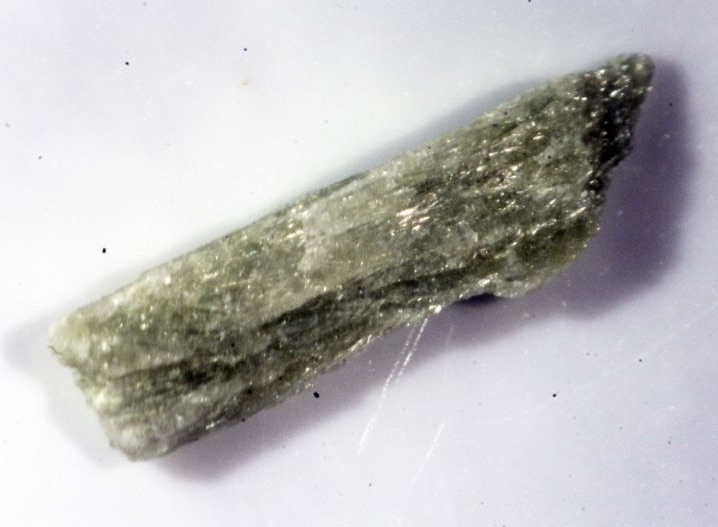

General
- Category: Borate mineral
- Formula: Mg_{7}(BO_{3)3}(OH)_{4}Cl
- IMA symbol: Ka
- Strunz classification: 6.AB.25
- Crystal system: Orthorhombic
- Crystal class: Disphenoidal (222); H-M symbol: (222)
- Space group: P2_{1}2_{1}2_{1}

Identification
- Formula mass: 412.74 g/mol
- Crystal habit: Acicular, fibrous, rosette like and fibrous aggregates
- Cleavage: Perfect on {001}
- Mohs scale hardness: 5 1/2
- Luster: Silky
- Streak: White
- Diaphaneity: Semitransparent
- Specific gravity: 2.80-2.85
- Optical properties: Biaxial (-)
- Refractive index: n_{α} = 1.589 n_{β} = 1.632 n_{γ} = 1.634
- Birefringence: δ = 0.045

Karlite (kar'-lite) is a silky white to light green orthorhombic borate mineral, not to be confused with tremolite-actinolite. It has a general formula of Mg_{7}(BO_{3})_{3}(OH)_{4}Cl. Karlite is named in honor of Franz Karl (1918–1972), professor of mineralogy and petrography at Christian Albrechts University in Kiel, Germany, for his studies of the geology of the eastern Alps.

Karlite possesses moderate optical relief, the degree to which the mineral grains stand out from the mounting medium. This mineral is orthorhombic and sphenoidal, exhibiting symmetry on 222. Karlite is also enantiomorphic and dihedral. It is a member of the P2_{1}2_{1}2_{1} space group. This mineral forms optically negative biaxial birefringent crystals, meaning that the 2V angle between the optic axes is bisected by the refractive index direction. Because this mineral possesses birefringence, we know it is anisotropic and will display double refraction; it breaks light into two different rays traveling at different speeds in the mineral.

Karlite is a relatively newly discovered borate mineral occurring in clinohumite-chlorite marble in calcsilicate-carbonate lenses embedded in amphibolite. The amphibole at the original locale is situated between tectonic units "Zentralgneis" and "Schieferhulle". Scholars assume that the high boron concentration needed for the formation of karlite is due to a contact metasomatism created by Hercynian tonalitic magmas, which make up the "Zentralgneis", although the boron content of karlite is not of commercial importance. This mineral was originally discovered in the Furtschaglkar near the Furtschaglhaus in Austria, but has also been found in Russia and France, and was probably formed during the alpine metamorphism of the Alps.
