= Sborgite =

Mineral

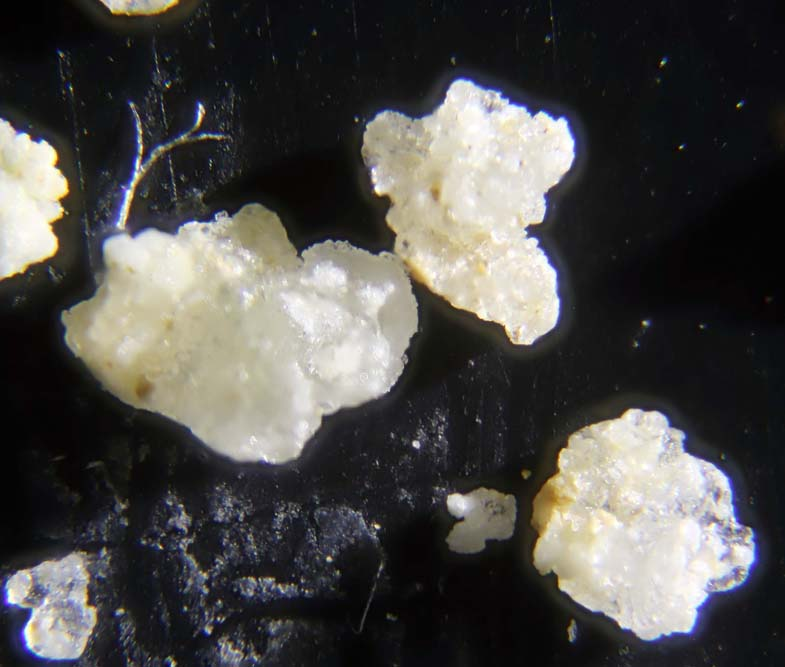

General
- Category: Nesoborates
- Formula: Na[B_{5}O_{6}(OH)_{4}]·3H_{2}O
- IMA symbol: Srg
- Strunz classification: 6.EA.05
- Crystal system: Monoclinic
- Crystal class: Prismatic (2/m) (same H-M symbol)
- Space group: C2/c

Identification
- Color: colorless
- Luster: vitreous
- Diaphaneity: transparent

Sborgite is a sodium borate mineral with formula Na[B_{5}O_{6}(OH)_{4}]·3H_{2}O. The formula can be written as the oxide formulation, Na_{2}O.5B_{2}O_{3}.10H_{2}O. Sometimes called sodium pentaborate pentahydrate it contains the pentaborate anion, (B_{5}O_{6}(OH)_{4})^{−}.

Sborgite is colorless with monoclinic crystals. It was named for Umberto Sborgi, (1883–1955), Professor of Chemistry, University of Milan, Italy. Sborgite occurs in Tuscany, Italy and the Furnace Creek district, Death Valley, California, US.

== See also ==
- List of minerals
