= Ameghinite =

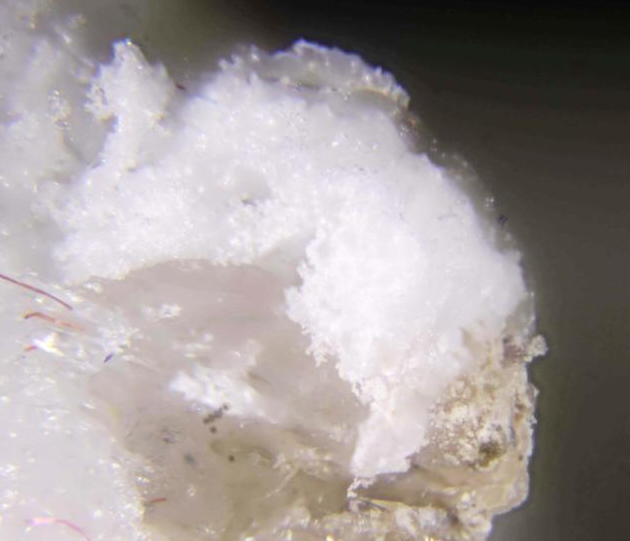

General
- Category: Nesoborates
- Formula: NaB_{3}O_{3}(OH)_{4}
- IMA symbol: Agh
- Strunz classification: 6.CA.10
- Crystal system: Monoclinic
- Crystal class: Prismatic (2/m) (same H-M symbol)
- Space group: C2/c

Ameghinite, Na[H_{4}B_{3}O_{7}] or NaB_{3}O_{3}(OH)_{4}, is a mineral found in Argentina. It is a soft mineral with a Mohs hardness of 2–3. Ameghinite has a monoclinic crystal system.

It was first described in 1967 for an occurrence in the Tincalayu Mine, Salar del Hombre Muerto, Salta, Argentina. It was named for Argentine geologist brothers, Carlos Ameghino (1865–1936) and Florentino Ameghino (1854–1911).
