= Suanite =

General
- Category: Borate mineral
- Formula: Mg_{2}B_{2}O_{5}
- Strunz classification: 6.BA.05
- Crystal system: Monoclinic
- Crystal class: Prismatic (2/m) (same H-M symbol)
- Space group: P2_{1}/a
- Unit cell: a = 12.31 Å, b = 3.12 Å c = 9.2 Å; β = 104.33°

Identification
- Color: White to pale gray
- Crystal habit: Clusters of prismatic to fibrous crystals
- Cleavage: Perfect parallel to {010}
- Mohs scale hardness: 5.5
- Luster: Silky to pearly
- Streak: White
- Diaphaneity: Translucent
- Specific gravity: 2.91
- Optical properties: Biaxial (–)
- Refractive index: n_{α} = 1.596 n_{β} = 1.639 n_{γ} = 1.670
- Birefringence: δ = 0.074
- 2V angle: 70°

Suanite is a magnesium borate mineral with formula Mg_{2}B_{2}O_{5}.

It was first described in 1953 by Japanese scientist Takeo Watanabe from the University of Tokyo. His first contact with the mineral was during analysis of gold- and copper- bearing skarn minerals from the Hol Kol mine, located in North Korea obtained in 1939. Due to the small sample size available to him, he was only able to determine the unknown substance's optical properties under a microscope. Watanabe was able to return to the site in 1943 and obtain further samples that permitted him to perform chemical analysis on the material.
