= Warwickite =

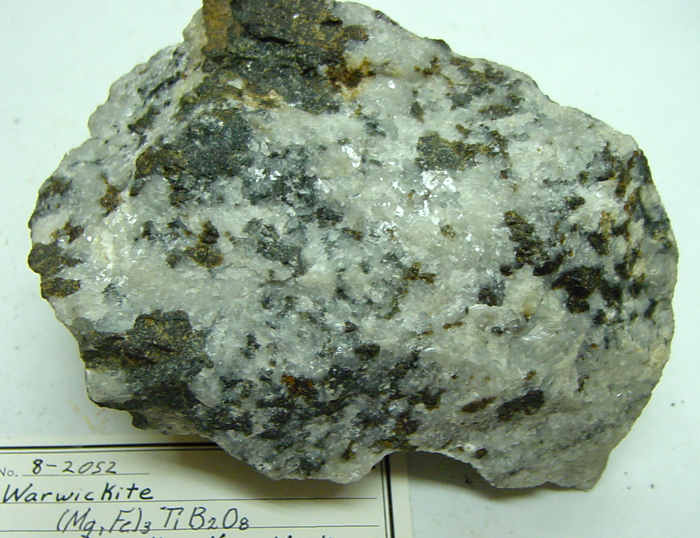
- Warwickite sample

General
- Category: Borate mineral
- Formula: (Mg,Fe^{2+})_{3}Ti[O,BO_{3}]_{2}
- IMA symbol: Wwk
- Strunz classification: 6.AB.20
- Crystal system: Orthorhombic
- Crystal class: Dipyramidal (mmm); H-M symbol: (2/m 2/m 2/m)
- Space group: Pnam

Identification
- Color: dark brown, grey to black¨
- Cleavage: perfect on {100}
- Fracture: irregular/uneven
- Mohs scale hardness: 3-4
- Luster: sub-Vitreous, pearly, sub-metallic, dull
- Streak: bluish black
- Specific gravity: 3.34 - 3.36

Warwickite is an iron magnesium titanium borate mineral with the chemical formula (MgFe)_{3}Ti(O, BO_{3})_{2} or Mg(Ti,Fe^{3+}, Al)(BO_{3})O. It occurs as brown to black prismatic orthorhombic crystals which are vitreous and transparent. It has a Mohs hardness of 3 to 4 and a specific gravity of 3.36.

== Occurrence ==
It occurs metasomatized limestone skarns and in lamproite and carbonatite veinlets. It was first described in 1838 near Warwick, Orange County, New York. It has also been reported from Bancroft, Ontario; in Murcia Province, Spain; in Siberia and near Pyongyang, North Korea.
