= Yuanfuliite =

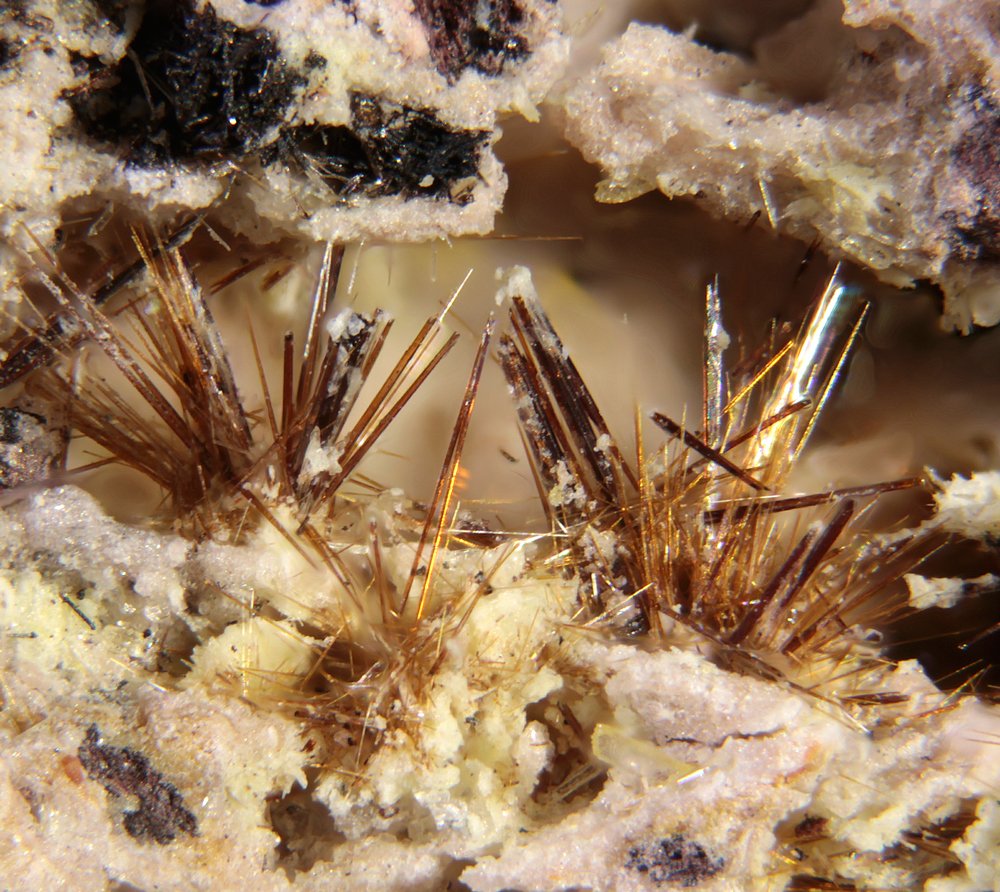

General
- Category: Minerals
- IMA symbol: Yfl
- Crystal system: Orthorhombic

Identification
- Color: black
- Mohs scale hardness: 5-6
- Luster: Adamantine
- Streak: Brownish-black

Yuanfuliite is a black submetal mineral. The mineral is named after the geologist Yuan Fuli.

It can be found in places like Russia, Sakha Republic, and Siberia.

It occurs in metamorphosed magnesium marble.
