= Veatchite =

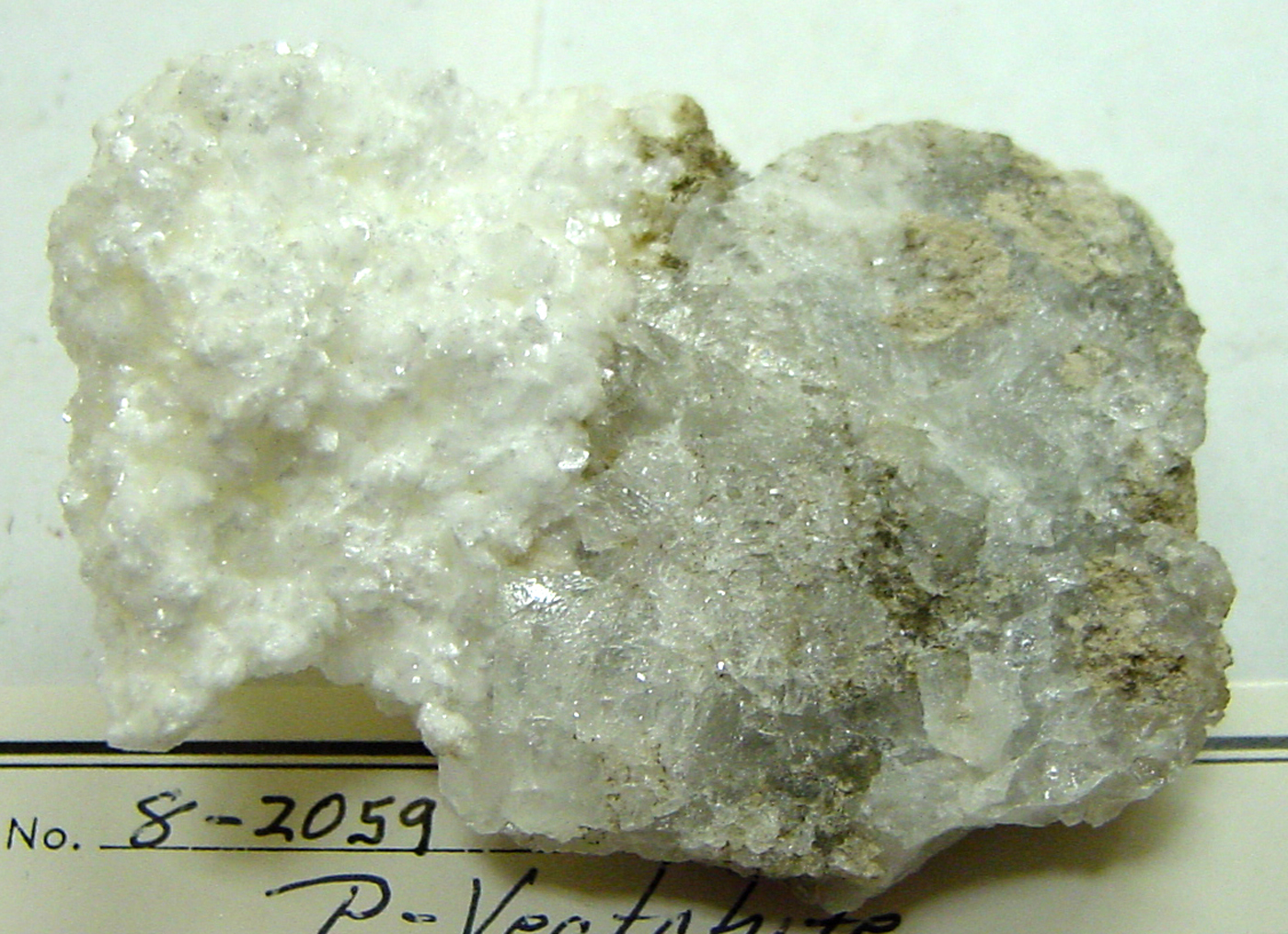
- Veatchite-p, Billie Mine, Death Valley, California

General
- Category: Phylloborates
- Formula: Sr_{2}B_{11}O_{16}(OH)_{5} · H_{2}O
- IMA symbol: Vea
- Strunz classification: 6.EC.15
- Crystal system: Monoclinic
- Crystal class: Domatic (m) (same H-M symbol)
- Space group: Aa
- Unit cell: a = 20.81 Å, b = 11.74 Å c = 6.63 Å; β = 92.03°; Z = 8

Identification
- Color: Colorless to white
- Crystal habit: Flattened platey to prismatic crystals, diverging fibrous clusters and cross fiber veinlets
- Cleavage: Perfect on {010}, indistinct on {001}
- Mohs scale hardness: 2
- Luster: Vitreous to pearly
- Diaphaneity: Transparent to translucent
- Specific gravity: 2.62
- Optical properties: Biaxial (+)
- Refractive index: n_{α} = 1.551 n_{β} = 1.553 n_{γ} = 1.620
- Birefringence: δ = 0.069
- 2V angle: Measured: 37°

Veatchite is an unusual strontium borate, with the chemical formula Sr_{2}B_{11}O_{16}(OH)_{5}·H_{2}O. There are two known polytypes, veatchite-A and veatchite-p.

Veatchite was discovered in 1938, at the Sterling Borax mine in Tick Canyon, Los Angeles County, California. Veatchite is named to honor John Veatch, the first person to detect boron in the mineral waters of California.

== See also ==
- List of minerals
