= Kernite =

Hydrated sodium borate hydroxide mineral

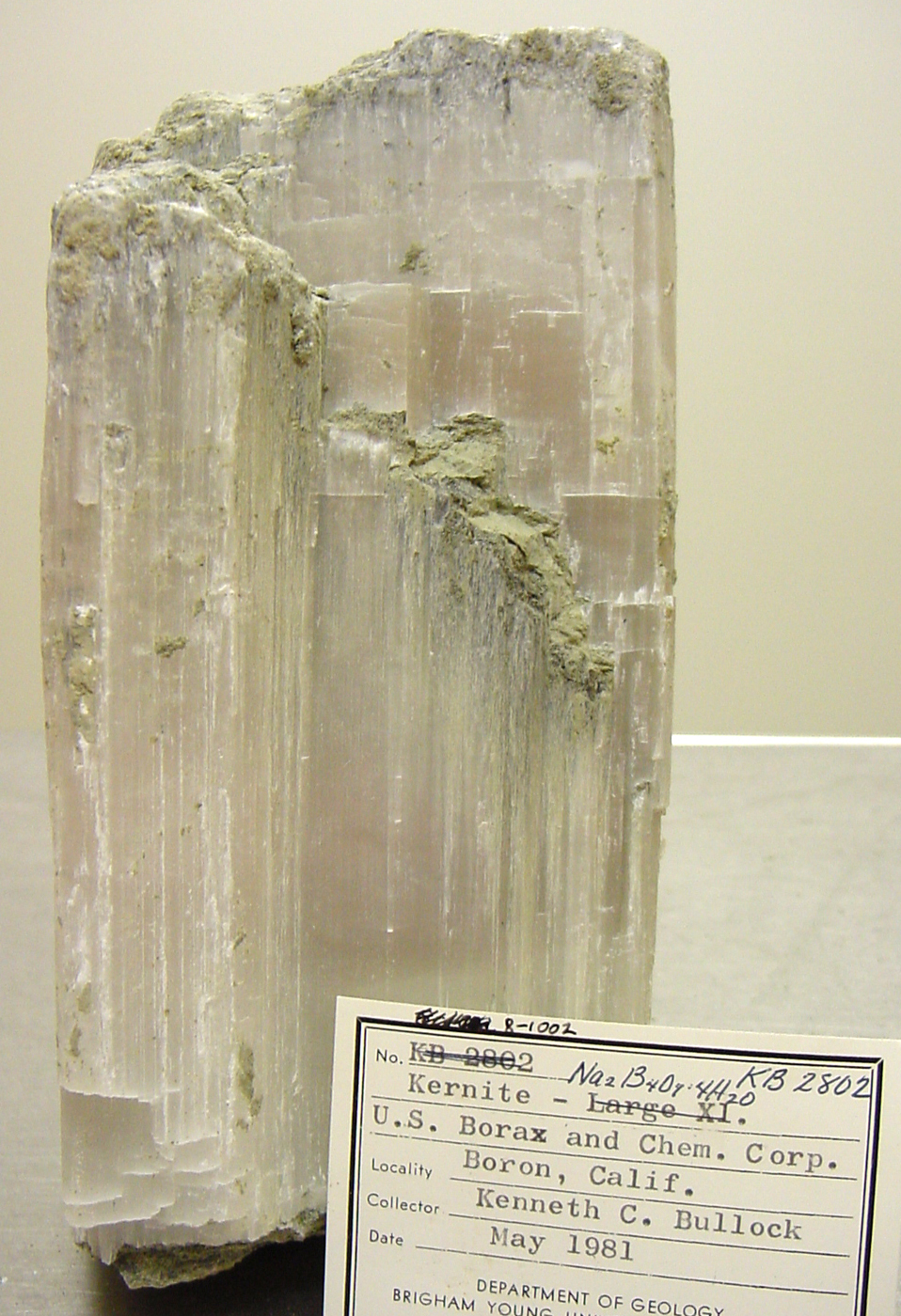

General
- Category: Inoborates
- Formula: Na_{2}B_{4}O_{6}(OH)_{2}·3H_{2}O
- IMA symbol: Ker
- Strunz classification: 6.DB.05
- Crystal system: Monoclinic
- Crystal class: Prismatic (2/m) (same H-M symbol)
- Space group: P2_{1}/c
- Unit cell: a = 7.0172(2) b = 9.1582(2) c = 15.6774(5) [Å] β = 108.861(2)°; Z = 4

Identification
- Formula mass: 273.22 g/mol
- Color: Colorless, white
- Crystal habit: Crystalline - occurs as well-formed coarse sized crystals
- Cleavage: Perfect on [100] and [001], good on [201]
- Fracture: Splintery
- Tenacity: Brittle
- Mohs scale hardness: 2.5-3
- Luster: Vitreous - pearly
- Streak: White
- Specific gravity: 1.9 - 1.92
- Optical properties: Biaxial (-)
- Refractive index: n_{α}=1.454, n_{β}=1.472, n_{γ}=1.488
- Birefringence: δ =0.0340
- 2V angle: 80°
- Other characteristics: Non-radioactive, non-fluorescent, non-magnetic

Kernite, also known as rasorite, is a hydrated sodium borate hydroxide mineral with formula Na_{2}B_{4}O_{6}(OH)_{2}·3H_{2}O. It is a colorless to white mineral crystallizing in the monoclinic crystal system typically occurring as prismatic to acicular crystals or granular masses. It is relatively soft with Mohs hardness of 2.5 to 3 and light with a specific gravity of 1.91. It exhibits perfect cleavage and a brittle fracture.

Kernite is soluble in cold water and alters to tincalconite when it dehydrates. It undergoes a non-reversible alteration to metakernite (Na_{2}B_{4}O_{7}·5H_{2}O) when heated to above 100 °C.

== Occurrence and history ==
The mineral occurs in sedimentary evaporite deposits in arid regions.

Kernite was discovered in 1926 in eastern Kern County, in Southern California, and later renamed after the county. The location was the US Borax Mine at Boron in the western Mojave Desert. This type material is stored at Harvard University, Cambridge, Massachusetts, and the National Museum of Natural History, Washington, D.C.

The Kern County mine was the only known source of the mineral for a period of time. More recently, kernite is mined in Argentina and Turkey.

The largest documented, single crystal of kernite measured 2.44 x 0.9 x 0.9 m^{3} and weighed ~3.8 tons.

== Uses ==
Kernite is used to produce borax which can be used in a variety of soaps.
