= Meyerhofferite =

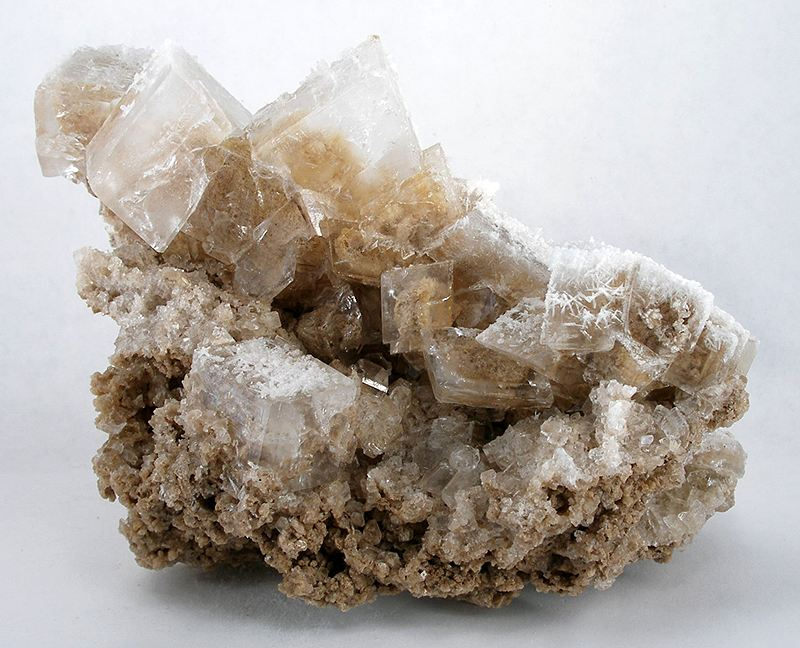

General
- Category: Nesoborates
- Formula: Ca_{2}B_{6}O_{6}(OH)_{10}·2H_{2}O
- IMA symbol: Mhf
- Strunz classification: 6.CA.30
- Crystal system: Triclinic
- Crystal class: Pinacoidal (1̅) (same H-M symbol)
- Space group: P1̅

Identification

Meyerhofferite is a hydrated borate mineral of calcium, with the chemical formula Ca_{2}B_{6}O_{6}(OH)_{10}·2H_{2}O, CaB_{3}O_{3}(OH)_{5}·H_{2}O or Ca_{2}(H_{3}B_{3}O_{7})_{2}·4H_{2}O. It occurs principally as an alteration product of inyoite, another borate mineral.

Natural meyerhofferite was discovered in 1914 in Death Valley, California It is named for German chemist Wilhelm Meyerhoffer (1864–1906), collaborator with J. H. van't Hoff on the composition and origin of saline minerals, who first synthesized the compound.

== See also ==
- List of minerals named after people
