= Sinhalite =

Borate mineral

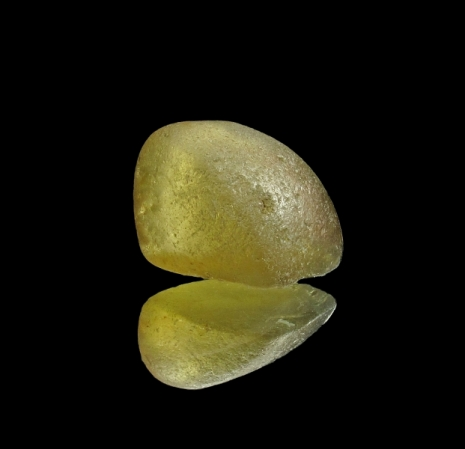

General
- Category: Minerals
- Formula: MgAl(BO_{4})
- IMA symbol: Shl
- Crystal system: Orthorhombic

Identification
- Color: White, gray, grayish-blue, pale to dark brown, yellow, yellowish-brown, greenish-brown, green, brownish-pink, pale pink
- Crystal habit: Grains, rolled pebbles, irregular masses. Rarely euhedral crystals.
- Cleavage: None
- Fracture: Conchoidal
- Mohs scale hardness: 6 1/2-7
- Streak: White
- Diaphaneity: Transparent, translucent
- Specific gravity: 3.46 to 3.50
- Density: 3.475-3.5
- Optical properties: Biaxial (-)
- Refractive index: 1.665 to 1.712
- Birefringence: 0.036 to 0.042
- Pleochroism: Trichroism: green, light brown, dark brown
- 2V angle: 56°
- Dispersion: 0.018
- Ultraviolet fluorescence: None

Sinhalite is a borate mineral with formula MgAl(BO_{4}).

Sinhalite was first found in Sri Lanka (Ceylon) in 1952, and was named from Sinhala - the Sanskrit name for Sri Lanka.

Gemstone quality Sinhalite can also be found in Madagascar, Tanzania and Myanmar (Burma). The most commonly seen color of Sinhalite are white to gray, grayish-blue or a shade of brown ranging from pale to dark. Pale pink and brownish pink crystals can be found in Tanzania.
