= Boracite =

Magnesium borate mineral

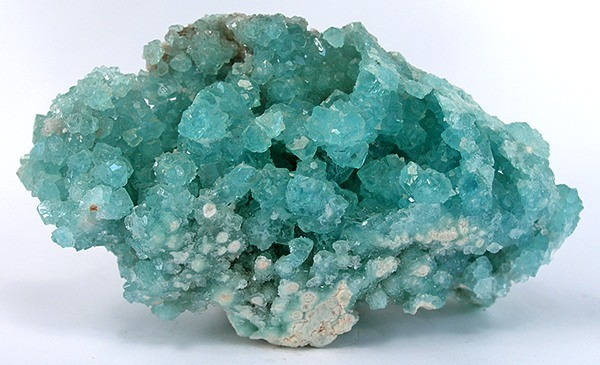

General
- Category: Tektoborates
- Formula: Mg_{3}B_{7}O_{13}Cl
- IMA symbol: Boc
- Strunz classification: 6.GA.05
- Dana classification: 25.06.01.01
- Crystal system: Orthorhombic
- Crystal class: Pyramidal (mm2) (same H-M symbol)
- Space group: Pca2_{1}
- Unit cell: a = 8.577(6) Å, b = 8.553(8) Å, c = 12.09(1) Å; Z = 4

Identification
- Formula mass: 392.03 g/mol
- Color: Colorless, white, gray, brown, orange, yellow, pale green, dark green, blue-green, or blue; colorless in transmitted light
- Crystal habit: Crystalline, disseminated (pseudocubic)
- Twinning: Rarely as penetration twins
- Cleavage: None
- Fracture: Irregular/uneven, conchoidal
- Tenacity: Brittle
- Mohs scale hardness: 7 - 7.5
- Luster: Vitreous - adamantine
- Streak: White
- Diaphaneity: Subtransparent to translucent
- Specific gravity: 2.95
- Density: 2.91 - 3.10
- Optical properties: Biaxial (+)
- Refractive index: n_{α}=1.658 - 1.662, n_{β}=1.662 - 1.667, n_{γ}=1.668 - 1.673
- Birefringence: δ = 0.010–0.011
- Pleochroism: None
- 2V angle: 82°
- Dispersion: 0.024 (weak)
- Ultraviolet fluorescence: None
- Solubility: Very slowly soluble in H_{2}O; Slowly but completely soluble in HCl

Boracite is a magnesium borate mineral with formula: Mg_{3}B_{7}O_{13}Cl. It occurs as blue green, colorless, gray, yellow to white crystals in the orthorhombic - pyramidal crystal system. Boracite also shows pseudo-isometric cubical and octahedral forms. These are thought to be the result of transition from an unstable high temperature isometric form on cooling. Penetration twins are not unusual. It occurs as well formed crystals and dispersed grains often embedded within gypsum and anhydrite crystals. It has a Mohs hardness of 7 to 7.5 and a specific gravity of 2.9. Refractive index values are nα = 1.658 - 1.662, nβ = 1.662 - 1.667 and nγ = 1.668 - 1.673. It has a conchoidal fracture and does not show cleavage. It is insoluble in water (not to be confused with borax, which is soluble in water).

Boracite is typically found in evaporite sequences associated with gypsum, anhydrite, halite, sylvite, carnallite, kainite and hilgardite. It was first described in 1789 for specimens from its type locality of Kalkberg hill, Lüneburg, Lower Saxony, Germany. It is also found near Sussex, New Brunswick.

The name is derived from its boron content (19 to 20% boron by mass).

== See also ==
- Classification of minerals
- List of minerals
