= Hydroboracite =

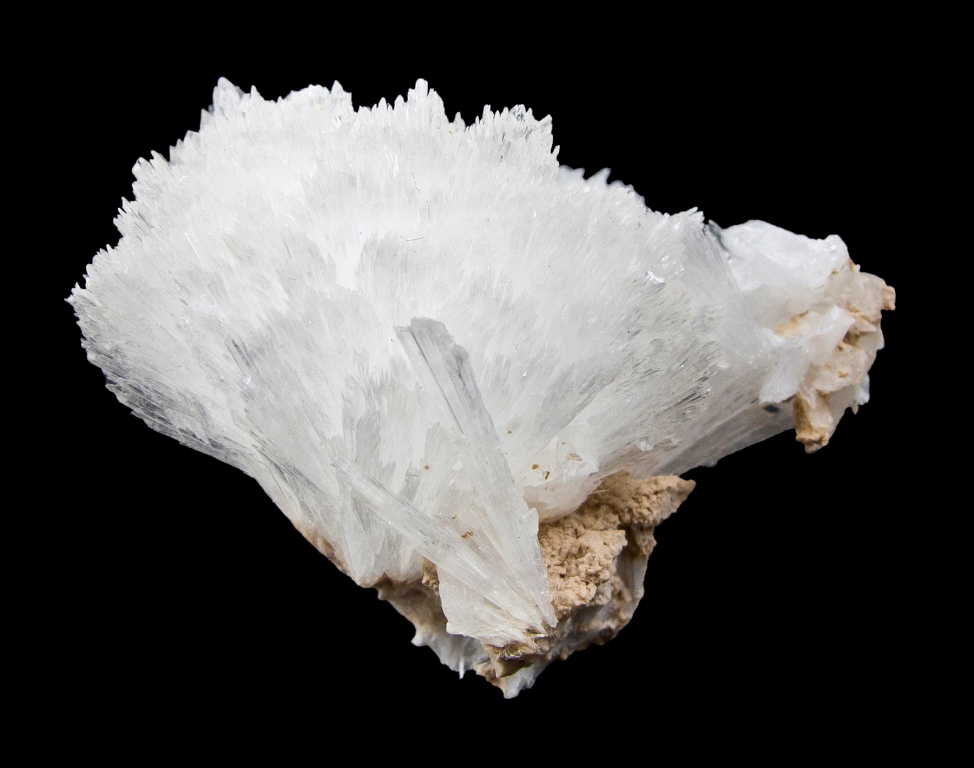

General
- Category: Inoborates
- Formula: CaMgB_{6}O_{8}(OH)_{6}·3H_{2}O
- IMA symbol: Hbo
- Strunz classification: 6.CB.15
- Crystal system: Monoclinic
- Crystal class: Prismatic (2/m) (same H-M symbol)
- Space group: P2/c
- Unit cell: a = 11.76, b = 6.68 c = 8.23 [Å]; β = 102.59°; Z = 2

Identification
- Colour: Colourless, white
- Mohs scale hardness: 2
- Luster: Vitreous, silky
- Diaphaneity: Transparent
- Optical properties: Biaxial (+)
- Refractive index: n_{α} = 1.520 – 1.523 n_{β} = 1.534 – 1.535 n_{γ} = 1.569 – 1.571
- Birefringence: δ = 0.049
- 2V angle: Measured: 60° to 66°, calculated: 62° to 66°
- Dispersion: Relatively weak
- Solubility: Very poorly soluble in cold water. Partially dissolved by prolonged submersion in boiling water.

Hydroboracite is a hydrated borate mineral (hence the name) of calcium and magnesium, whose chemical composition is CaMgB_{6}O_{8}(OH)_{6}·3H_{2}O. It was discovered in 1834 in the Inder lake, Atyrau Province, Kazakhstan. Hydroboracite is a minor borate ore mineral.
