= Colemanite =

Borate mineral

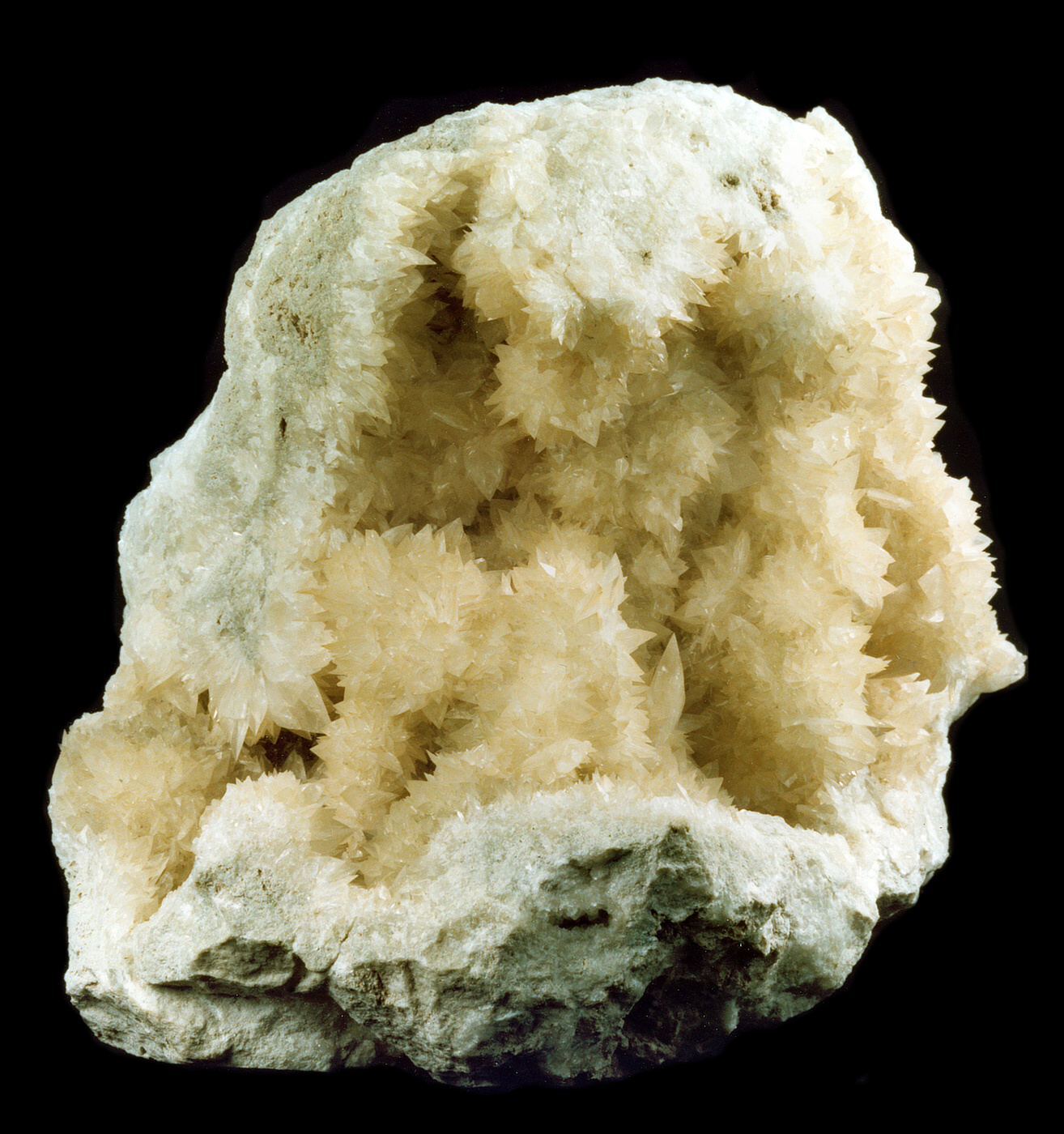

General
- Category: Inoborates
- Formula: Ca_{2}B_{6}O_{11}·5H_{2}O
- IMA symbol: Cole
- Strunz classification: 6.CB.10
- Crystal system: Monoclinic
- Crystal class: Prismatic (2/m) (same H-M symbol)
- Space group: P2_{1}/a
- Unit cell: a = 8.712(2) Å, b = 11.247(3) Å, c = 6.091(1) Å; β = 110.12°; Z = 4

Identification
- Color: Colorless, white, yellowish, grey
- Crystal habit: Massive granular to coarsely crystalline, most commonly nodular.
- Cleavage: [010] perfect, [001] distinct
- Fracture: Brittle uneven to subconchoidal
- Mohs scale hardness: 4.5
- Luster: Vitreous
- Streak: White
- Diaphaneity: Transparent to translucent
- Specific gravity: 2.42
- Optical properties: Biaxial (+)
- Refractive index: nα = 1.586 nβ = 1.592 nγ = 1.614
- Birefringence: δ = 0.028
- Fusibility: 1.5
- Diagnostic features: Exfoliates on heating, produces a green flame
- Other characteristics: Bright pale yellow fluorescence, may phosphoresce pale green; pyroelectric and piezoelectric at very low temperature.

Colemanite (Ca_{2}B_{6}O_{11}·5H_{2}O) or (CaB_{3}O_{4}(OH)_{3}·H_{2}O) is a borate mineral found in evaporite deposits of alkaline lacustrine environments. Colemanite is a secondary mineral that forms by alteration of borax and ulexite.

It was first described in 1884 for an occurrence near Furnace Creek in Death Valley and was named after William Tell Coleman (1824–1893), owner of the mine "Harmony Borax Works" where it was first found. At the time, Coleman had alternatively proposed the name "smithite" instead after his business associate Francis Marion Smith.

== Uses ==
Colemanite was the most important ore of boron until the discovery of kernite in 1926. It has many industrial uses such as in heat resistant glass manufacturing.

== Occurrence ==
About 40% of the world's known colemanite reserves are at the Emet mine in western Turkey. Other important sources in Turkey are found at Bigadiç and Kestelek.

== See also ==
- List of minerals
- List of minerals named after people
