= Simpsonite =

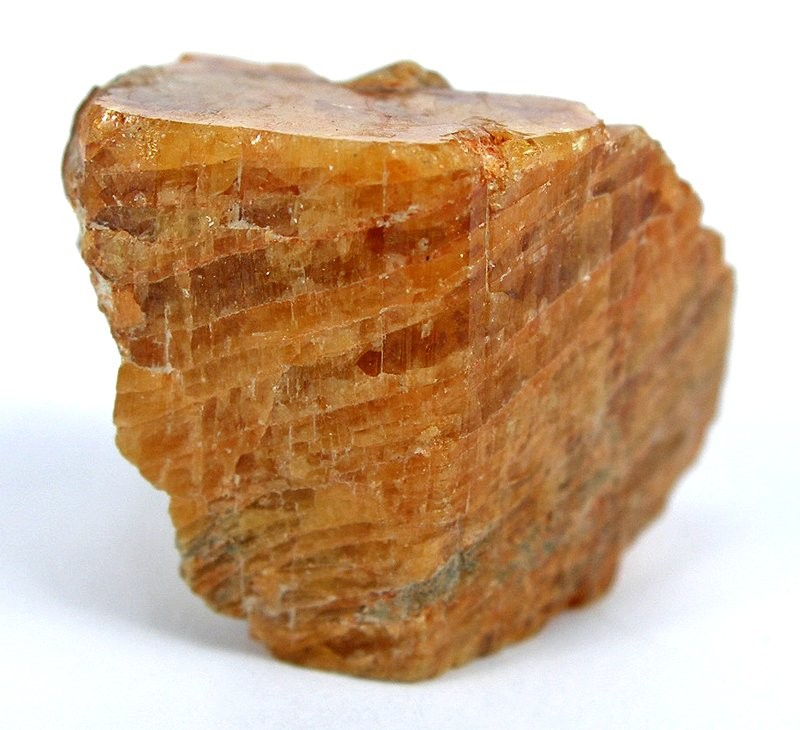
- Locality: Alto do Giz pegmatite, Rio Grande do Norte, Brazil. Size: 1.6 × 1.5 × 1.8 cm.

General
- Category: Oxide minerals
- Formula: Al_{4}(Ta,Nb)_{3}O_{13}(OH)
- IMA symbol: Spn
- Strunz classification: 4.DC.10
- Crystal system: Trigonal
- Crystal class: Pyramidal (3); H-M symbol: (3)
- Space group: P3
- Unit cell: a = 7.37, c = 4.51 [Å]; Z = 1

Identification
- Formula mass: 813.65 g/mol
- Color: White to cream, yellow to yellow-brown when altered
- Crystal habit: Euhedral, prismatic, striated
- Cleavage: None
- Fracture: Conchoidal
- Tenacity: Brittle
- Mohs scale hardness: 7–7.5
- Luster: Vitreous to adamantine
- Streak: White
- Diaphaneity: Semitransparent
- Specific gravity: 6.7
- Optical properties: Uniaxial negative
- Refractive index: n_{ω} = 2.045 n_{ε} = 2.025
- Birefringence: δ = 0.020
- Other characteristics: Blue-white cathodoluminescence and yellow fluorescence in SW UV

Simpsonite has a general formula of Al_{4}(Ta,Nb)_{3}O_{13}(OH). It occurs as euhedral to subhedral tabular to short and prismatic crystals, commonly in subparallel groups. Under the petrographic microscope it has a very high relief.

Discovered in 1938, it was named after Edward Sydney Simpson (1875–1939), government mineralogist and analyst of Western Australia. It is an accessory mineral in some tantalum-rich granite pegmatites. It occurs in association with tantalite, manganotantalite, microlite, tapiolite, beryl, spodumene, montebrasite, pollucite, petalite, eucryptite, tourmaline, muscovite and quartz. It is found in a few locations around the world, notably in the Onca and Paraíba mines of Rio Grande do Norte, Brazil and at Tabba Tabba, Western Australia.
