= Pollucite =

Zeolite mineral

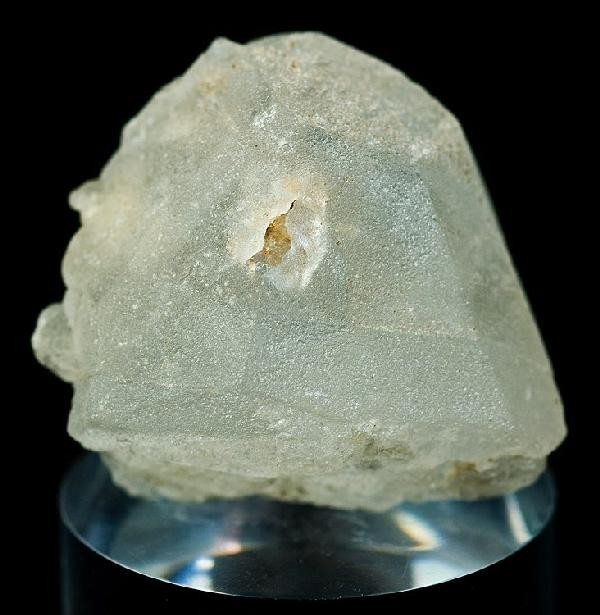
- Euhedral, tabular crystal of colorless, translucent and lustrous pollucite with frosted crystal faces from Afghanistan (size: 2.7 x 2.4 x 1.2 cm)

General
- Category: Tectosilicate minerals
- Group: Zeolite group
- Formula: Cs(Si_{2}Al)O_{6}·nH_{2}O
- IMA symbol: Pol
- Strunz classification: 9.GB.05
- Dana classification: 77.1.1.2
- Crystal system: Isometric
- Crystal class: Hexoctahedral (m3̅m); H-M symbol: (4/m 3̅ 2/m)
- Space group: Ia3̅d
- Unit cell: a = 13.67 Å; Z = 16

Identification
- Color: Usually colorless; also white, grey, pink, blue or violet
- Crystal habit: Usually massive; rare crystals are normally trapezohedral or cubic
- Cleavage: None observed
- Fracture: Conchoidal to uneven
- Tenacity: Brittle
- Mohs scale hardness: 6.5 to 7
- Luster: Vitreous to greasy
- Streak: White
- Diaphaneity: Transparent to translucent
- Specific gravity: 2.7 to 3.0
- Optical properties: Isotropic or very weakly anisotropic
- Refractive index: 1.508–1.528
- Solubility: Readily soluble in HF; dissolves with difficulty in hot HCl
- Other characteristics: Sometimes weakly fluorescent under SW and LW UV

Pollucite is a zeolite mineral with the formula (Cs,Na)_{2}Al_{2}Si_{4}O_{12}·2H_{2}O with iron, calcium, rubidium and potassium as common substituting elements. It is important as a significant ore of caesium and sometimes rubidium. It forms a solid solution series with analcime. It crystallizes in the isometric-hexoctahedral crystal system as colorless, white, gray, or rarely pink and blue masses. Well-formed crystals are rare. It has a Mohs hardness of 6.5 and a specific gravity of 2.9, with a brittle fracture and no cleavage.

== Discovery and occurrence ==
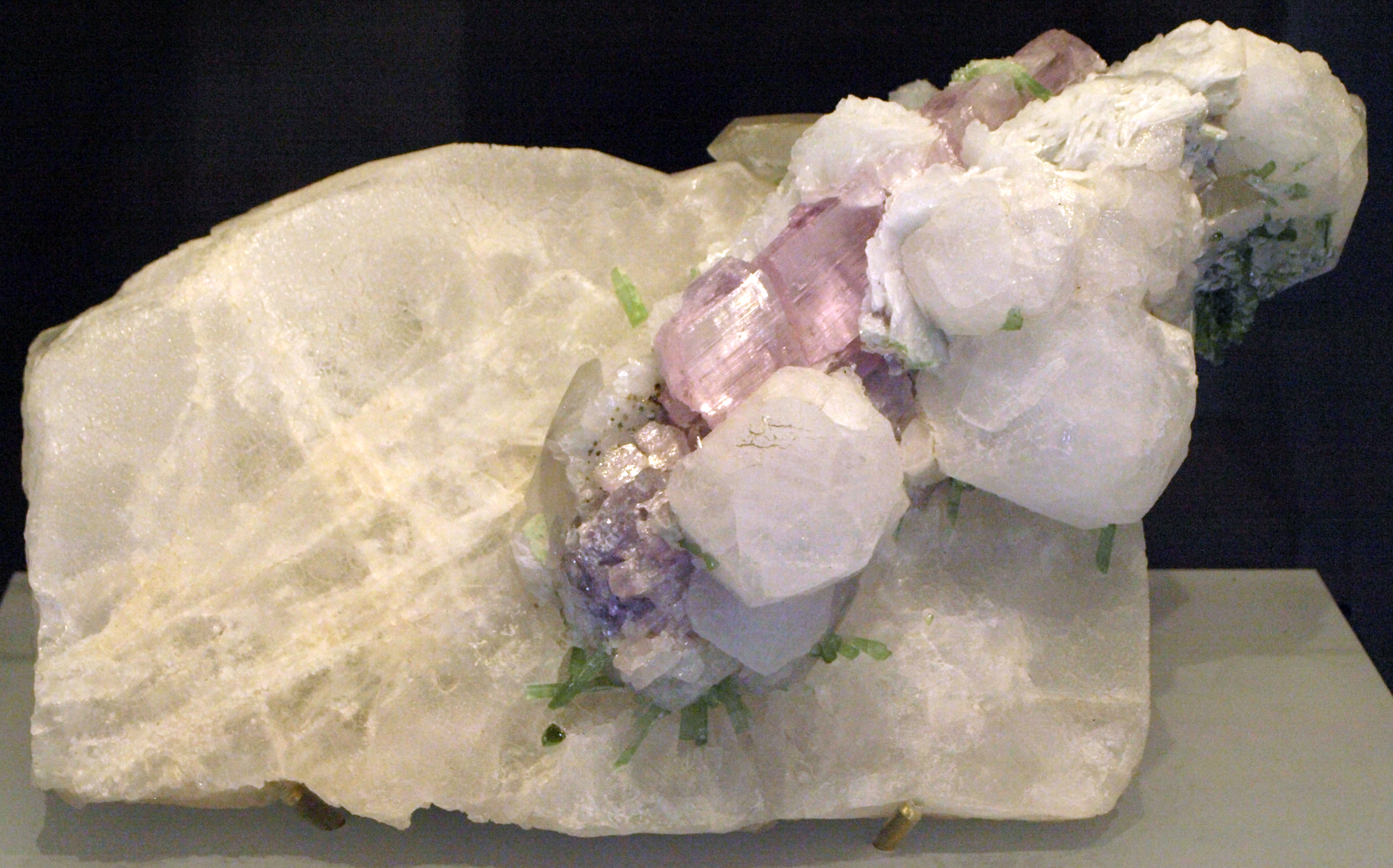
A pollucite ore sample held in the Royal Ontario Museum

It was first described by August Breithaupt in 1846 for occurrences on the island of Elba, Italy. It is named for Pollux, the twin of Castor on the grounds that it is often found associated with petalite (previously known as castorite). The high caesium content was missed by the first analysis by Karl Friedrich Plattner in 1848, but after the discovery of caesium in 1860 a second analysis in 1864 was able to show the high caesium content of pollucite.

Its typical occurrence is in lithium-rich granite pegmatites in association with quartz, spodumene, petalite, amblygonite, lepidolite, elbaite, cassiterite, columbite, apatite, eucryptite, muscovite, albite and microcline.

About 82% of the world's known reserves of pollucite occur near Bernic Lake in Manitoba, Canada, where they are mined for their caesium content for use in caesium formate oil drilling assistance. This ore is about 23% to 25% caesium by weight.
