= Tanco Mine =

Underground mine in Manitoba, Canada

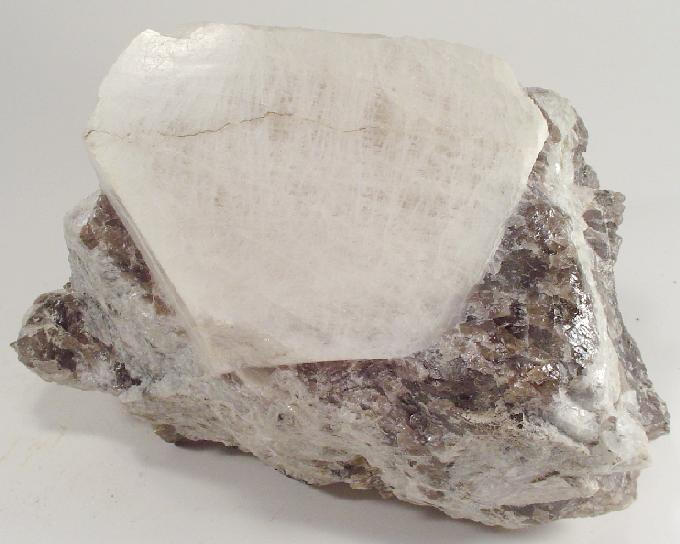
- Beryl crystal on pegmatite matrix excavated at Tanco Mine

- Location in Manitoba
- Location: Bernic Lake, Manitoba, Canada; 50°25′48″N 95°26′47″W
- Products: Caesium from Pollucite, Spodumene, Tantalum
- Opened: 1969
- Closed: Currently open
- Company: Sinomine Resource Group
- Website: https://tancomine.com

The Tanco Mine or Bernic Lake mine is an underground caesium and tantalum mine, owned and since 2019 owned and operated by Sinomine Resource Group on the north west shore of Bernic Lake, Manitoba, Canada. The mine has the largest known deposit of pollucite and is also the world's largest producer of caesium.

The mine has the largest tantalum reserves in Canada having estimated reserves of 2.1 million tonnes of ore grading 0.22% tantalum. The mine also has additional reserves amounting to 7.3 million tonnes of ore grading 2.76% lithium. The mine also produces caesium brine, which is converted into caesium formate which is used mostly as additive for drilling fluids to increase the fluid's density. A concentrated solution of caesium formate has a density of 2.3 g/cm^{3}.

== History ==
The pegmatite ore body now mined by the Tanco Mine was discovered in the late 1920s and the first mining started in 1929. Several times the mine was closed, reopened and closed, until in 1969 when it was reopened as a tantalum mine.

Cabot Corporation bought the mine in 1993, and began the production of caesium brine from pollucite in 1996.

Tanco Mine was purchased by Sinomine in June 2019. Sinomine paid $135 million with an additional 10-year lithium royalty consideration. Tax impact was unexpected.

== Geology ==
The pegmatite found at the north west shore and below the lake floor of Bernic Lake is a granitic igneous rock enriched in the incompatible elements, for example caesium, lithium, tantalum and beryllium. Pegmatite forms if magmatic rock slowly crystallizes, and the incompatible elements are concentrated in the residual molten magma. Examples of minerals found in the mine are the lithium-containing spodumene and amblygonite, caesium-containing pollucite, beryllium-containing beryl and tantalum- and niobium-containing simpsonite and tantalite.

== Deposit ==
The pollucite (chemical formula (Cs,Na)_{2}Al_{2}Si_{4}O_{12}·2H_{2}O) deposit associated with the pegmatite is the largest known deposit of this mineral and with 350,000 tons, it accounts for two thirds of the known resources. The mined pollucite contains approximately 24% Cs_{2}O. The ore body is 1400 m long, 600 m wide and 100 m deep. For several decades the pegmatites at Bernic Lake have supplied the world with the needed caesium.
