= Brazilianite =

Yellow-green phosphate mineral

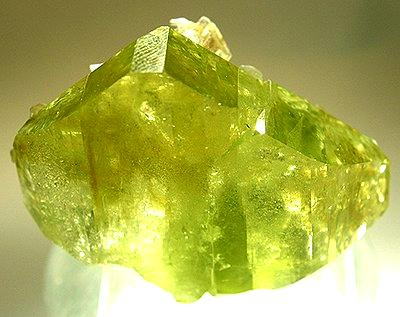
- Brazilianite from type locality, Conselheiro Pena, Minas Gerais, Brazil

General
- Category: Phosphate minerals
- Formula: NaAl_{3}(PO_{4})_{2}(OH)_{4} sodium aluminium phosphate hydroxide
- IMA symbol: Bzl
- Strunz classification: 8.BK.05
- Crystal system: Monoclinic
- Crystal class: Prismatic (2/m) (same H-M symbol)
- Space group: P2_{1}/n
- Unit cell: a = 11.229 Å, b = 10.142 Å, c = 7.098 Å; β = 97.4°; Z = 4

Identification
- Color: Yellow, green, colorless
- Crystal habit: Prismatic crystals, may be radially-fibrous or globular druses
- Cleavage: (010) Distinct to good
- Fracture: Conchoidal
- Mohs scale hardness: 5.5
- Luster: Vitreous
- Streak: White
- Diaphaneity: Transparent to translucent
- Specific gravity: 2.98
- Optical properties: Biaxial (+)
- Refractive index: n_{α} = 1.602 n_{β} = 1.609 n_{γ} = 1.621 - 1.623
- Birefringence: δ = 0.019 - 0.021

Brazilianite, whose name derives from its country of origin, Brazil, is a typically yellow-green phosphate mineral, most commonly found in phosphate-rich pegmatites.

It occurs in the form of perfect crystals grouped in druses, in pegmatites, and is often of precious-stone quality. One noted deposit of brazilianite is in the surroundings of Conselheiro Pena, in Minas Gerais, Brazil.

Some of these are found on leaves of muscovite with their strong silvery glitter, ingrown in their parent rock. The crystals, dark greenish-yellow to olive-green, sometimes measure up to 12 cm (4.7 in) in length and 8 cm (3.1 in) in width. Crystals of similar shape and dimensions have been discovered in another deposit in Minas Gerais, near Mantena, but they lack the perfection of the crystal form. Many brazilianite specimens found in mineral collections originated from the Palermo and the Charles Davis mines in Grafton County, New Hampshire.

== Composition ==
Brazilianite, NaAl_{3}(PO_{4})_{2}(OH)_{4} is a hydrous sodium aluminium phosphate that forms through the metasomatic alteration of amblygonite-montebrasite. Amblygonite, LiAlPO_{4}F in combination with quartz goes through an OH-F exchange to make montebrasite, LiAlPO_{4}{F,OH} at temperatures greater than 480 °C. Natromontebrasite, NaAl(PO_{4})(OH), is formed when montebrasite does though Li-leaching process and there is a Na cation exchange at temperatures less than 450 °C. Brazilianite concludes this process by forming as natromontebrasite combines with fluorapatite, Ca_{5}(PO_{4})_{3}F. Due to its formation caused by the amblygonite-montebrasite alteration and the presence of tourmaline in the environment where brazilianite forms, different elements are present in the mineral such as P, Al, Fe, Mn, Ba, Sr, Ca, Mg, Na, K, F, and Cl. There are many substitution possibilities in the brazilianite formula. Besides sodium, being replaced by any other element, iron can replace aluminium, and vanadates or arsenates can replace the phosphates.

== Structure ==
Brazilianite is composed of chains of edge-sharing Al-O octahedra that are linked by P-O tetrahedra with sodium in the cavity of the framework. The crystal structure of brazilianite is a~11.23 Å, b~10.14 Å, c~7.10 Å, β~97.4° and Z = 4. The Al-octahedra has two types of octahedral coordination: trans-AlO_{4}(OH)_{2} and trans-AlO_{3}(OH)_{3}. The two phosphorus atoms in brazilianite are coordinated in a tetrahedral with four oxygen atoms each. The sodium atom is located within the P-O and Al-O polyhedral in an irregular cavity. The coordination of the sodium is best described as the uncommon seven-coordination. The presence of a hydrogen ion in the same cavity where a sodium ion is causes a repulsion between the two, forcing sodium to one side of the cavity so that is it more coordinated with oxygen than its other side. Gatehouse et al., 1974 described the four remaining hydrogen as being in a chain and contributing to the complexity of the structure but Gatta et al., 2013, gives a well define H-bonding scheme and how these hydrogen items confines in OH groups. One of the hydrogen in brazilianite splits to make a fifth hydrogen. The splitting of this hydrogen has not been explained why it happens but it was shown that it can affect the hydrogen bond configuration. Some of the oxygen atoms in the four OH groups in brazilianite act as donors and some as acceptors of the hydrogen bond. One of these oxygen items is both a donor and acceptor to accommodate the hydrogen that split into two.

== Physical properties ==
Brazilianite is a mineral in the monoclinic system that is part of the point group 2/m and belongs to the space group P21/n. The crystals of brazilianite are elongated and prismatic along [100]. Most common forms that are measured in brazilianite {010}, {110}, { 11̅1}. It displays a perfect cleavage on (010), it is brittle and has a conchoidal fracture. The mineral has a Mohs hardness of 5.5 and was believed it had a specific gravity of 2.94 which was first determined by Pough and Henderson, 1945. With the second occurrence of the mineral, it was determined that the specific gravity of the mineral was actually 2.98. Brazilianite has a vitreous luster, has a white streak, and the mineral is translucent to transparent. The color of brazilianite ranges from dark yellow-green to a pale yellow. Brazilianite begins to lose its color when heated to 200 °C and becomes colorless when it is heated to 300 °C.

== Geological occurrence ==
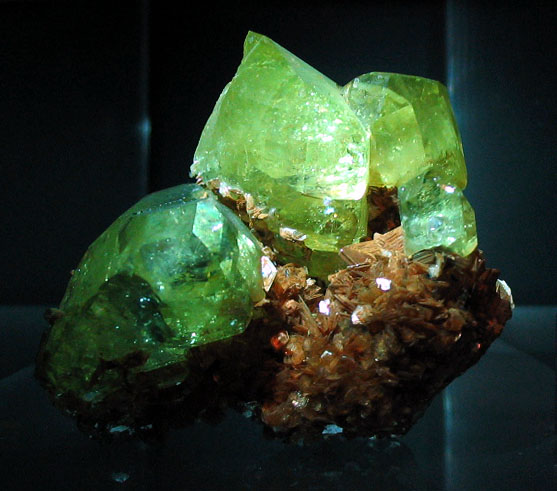
Brazilianite crystals on muscovite, Galilea mine, Minas Gerais, Brazil

Brazilianite is typically found in granite pegmatite and it is often found within the cavities within the pegmatite where quartz, beryl and mica are also found. Different habits of brazilianite have been found in different locations. Brazilianite is often found with muscovite. The Corrego Frio pegmatite where brazilianite is found in Brazil is an altered pegmatite dike that had weathered biotite schist between its walls. In New Hampshire, the pegmatite where the brazilianite was found was made up of 99 percent albite, mica, and quartz. Brazilianite also found with tourmaline and feldspar. The sequence of the mineral formation in the pegmatite in Brazil had not been determined. The sequence of mineral formation in New Hampshire was quartz, brazilianite, apatite, whitlockite, and quartz. During the hydrothermal stage, the pegmatite containing the brazilianite is traversed by a late stage low temperature hydrothermal veins where amblygonite-montebrasite is altered to form brazilianite. Brazilianite has been described from other granite pegmatites in Brazil and the United States. It has also been found in different locations in the world, including Rwanda, Yukon Creek in Canada, Argentina, China, France, and Australia.

== Special characteristics ==
Brazilianite is sometimes used as a gemstone. Brazilianite is relatively new phosphate minerals along with amblygonite, turquoise and apatite that are used as gemstones. Brazilianite is often confused with amblygonite, apatite, chrysoberyl, beryl, and topaz. Even though it was first described in 1945, its discovery was actually in 1944 but it was believed it was chrysoberyl until analysis was done to the mineral indicating a new mineral. The State of Minas Gerais is the largest producer and exporter of gemstones in Brazil and is accountable for 74 percent of the official production which includes brazilianite. It is soft and fragile causing it not to be a popular stone. When brazilianite is heated, it loses it yellow color and becomes colorless.
