= Eucryptite =

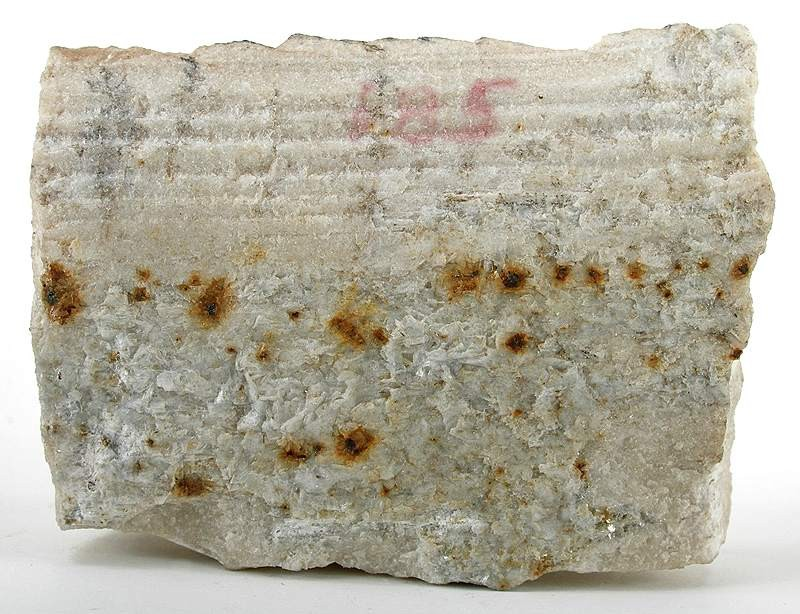
- Eucryptite grains in albite from the type locality (size: 9.3 × 7.0 × 2.8 cm)

General
- Category: Silicate mineral
- Formula: LiAlSiO_{4}
- IMA symbol: Ecp
- Crystal system: Trigonal
- Crystal class: Rhombohedral (3̅); H-M symbol: (3̅)
- Space group: R3̅
- Unit cell: a = 13.48, c = 9.01 [Å]; Z = 18

Identification
- Color: Brown, colorless, white
- Crystal habit: Rare as euhedral crystals, coarse crystalline aggregates and massive
- Cleavage: Indistinct on {101̅0} and {0001}
- Fracture: Conchoidal
- Tenacity: Very brittle
- Mohs scale hardness: 6.5
- Luster: Vitreous
- Streak: White
- Diaphaneity: Transparent to translucent
- Density: 2.67
- Optical properties: Uniaxial (+)
- Refractive index: n_{ω} = 1.570 – 1.573 n_{ε} = 1.583 – 1.587
- Birefringence: δ = 0.013
- Other characteristics: Fluoresces pink to red or orange under SW UV

Eucryptite is a lithium-bearing aluminium silicate mineral with formula LiAlSiO_{4}. It crystallizes in the trigonal - rhombohedral crystal system. It typically occurs as granular to massive in form and may pseudomorphically replace spodumene. It has a brittle to conchoidal fracture and indistinct cleavage. It is transparent to translucent and varies from colorless to white to brown. It has a Mohs hardness of 6.5 and a specific gravity of 2.67. Optically it is uniaxial positive with refractive index values of nω = 1.570 – 1.573 and nε = 1.583 – 1.587.

Its typical occurrence is in lithium-rich pegmatites in association with albite, spodumene, petalite, amblygonite, lepidolite and quartz.

It occurs as a secondary alteration product of spodumene. It was first described in 1880 for an occurrence at its type locality, Branchville, Connecticut. Its name was from the Greek for well concealed, for its typical occurrence embedded in albite.
