= Lepidolite =

Phyllosilicate mineral series in the trioctahedral mica group

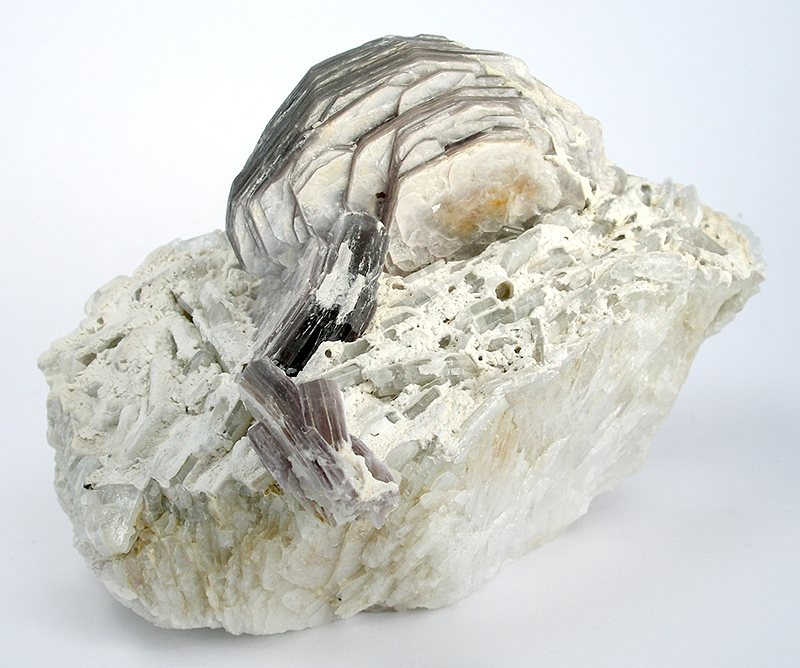

General
- Category: Phyllosilicate minerals
- Group: Mica group, trioctahedral mica group
- Series: Polylithionite-Trilithionite series
- Formula: K(Li,Al)_{3}(Al,Si)_{4}O_{10}(F,OH)_{2}
- IMA symbol: Lpd
- Strunz classification: 9.EC.20
- Crystal system: Monoclinic
- Crystal class: Prismatic (2/m) (same H-M symbol)
- Space group: C2/m, Cm
- Unit cell: a = 5.209(2) Å, b = 9.011(5) Å, c = 10.149(5) Å; β = 100:77(4)°; Z = 2

Identification
- Color: Pink, light purple, purple, rose-red, violet-gray, yellowish, white, colorless other colors possible but are rare.
- Crystal habit: Tabular to prismatic pseudohexagonal crystals, scaly aggregates and massive
- Twinning: Rare, composition plane {001}
- Cleavage: {001} perfect
- Fracture: Uneven
- Mohs scale hardness: 2.5–3
- Luster: Vitreous to pearly
- Streak: White
- Diaphaneity: Transparent to translucent
- Specific gravity: 2.8–2.9
- Optical properties: Biaxial (−)
- Refractive index: n_{α}=1.525–1.548, n_{β}=1.551–1.58, n_{γ}=1.554–1.586
- Birefringence: 0.0290–0.0380
- Pleochroism: X = almost colorless; Y = Z = pink, pale violet
- 2V angle: 0° – 58° measured

Lepidolite is the common name for a lilac-gray or rose-colored series of minerals in the mica group. The mineralogical name for this series is the polylithionite-trilithionite series. Lepidolite has a chemical formula of K(Li,Al)_{3}(Al,Si)_{4}O_{10}(F,OH)_{2}. It is the most abundant lithium-bearing mineral and is a secondary source of this metal. It is also the major source of the alkali metal rubidium, which substitutes (as in all minerals) for potassium.

Lepidolite is found with other lithium-bearing minerals, such as spodumene, in pegmatite bodies. It has also been found in high-temperature quartz veins, greisens and granite.

== Description ==
Lepidolite is a phyllosilicate mineral and a member of the polylithionite-trilithionite series. Lepidolite is part of a three-part series consisting of polylithionite, lepidolite, and trilithionite. All three minerals share similar properties and are caused because of varying ratios of lithium and aluminum in their chemical formulas. The Li:Al ratio varies from 2:1 in polylithionite up to 1.5:1.5 in trilithionite.

Lepidolite is found naturally in a variety of colors, mainly pink, purple, and red, but also gray and, rarely, yellow and colorless. Because lepidolite is a lithium-bearing mica, it is often wrongly assumed that lithium is what causes the pink hues that are so characteristic of this mineral. Instead, it is trace amounts of manganese that cause the pink, purple, and red colors.

=== Structure and composition ===
Lepidolite belongs to the group of trioctahedral micas, with a structure resembling biotite. This structure is sometimes described as TOT-c. The crystal consists of stacked TOT layers weakly bound together by potassium ions (c). Each TOT layer consists of two outer T (tetrahedral) sheets in which silicon or aluminium ions each bind with four oxygen atoms, which in turn bind to other aluminium and silicon to form the sheet structure. The inner O (octahedral) sheet contains iron or magnesium ions each bonded to six oxygen, fluoride, or hydroxide ions. In biotite, silicon occupies three out of every four tetrahedal sites in the crystal and aluminium occupies the remaining tetrahedral sites, while magnesium or iron fill all the available octahedral sites.

Lepidolite shares this structure, but aluminium and lithium substitute for magnesium and iron in the octahedral sites. If nearly equal quantities of aluminium and lithium occupy the octahedral sites, the resulting mineral is trilithionite, KLi_{1.5}Al_{1.5}(AlSi_{3})O_{10}(F,OH)_{2} If lithium occupies two out of three octahedral sites and aluminium the remaining octahedra site, then charge balance can be preserved only if silicon occupies all the tetrahedral sites. The result is polylithionite, KLi_{2}AlSi_{4}O_{10}(F,OH)_{2}. Lepidolite has a composition intermediate between these end members.

Fluoride ions can substitute for some of the hydroxide in the structure, while sodium, rubidium, or caesium may substitute in small quantities for potassium.

== Occurrences ==
Lepidolite is associated with other lithium-bearing minerals like spodumene in pegmatite bodies. It is the major source of the alkali metal rubidium. In 1861, Robert Bunsen and Gustav Kirchhoff extracted 150 kg (330 lb) of lepidolite to yield a few grams of rubidium salts for analysis, and therefore discovered the new element rubidium.

It occurs in granite pegmatites, in some high-temperature quartz veins, greisens and granites. Associated minerals include quartz, feldspar, spodumene, amblygonite, tourmaline, columbite, cassiterite, topaz and beryl.

Notable occurrences include Brazil; Ural Mountains, Russia; California and the Black Hills, United States; Tanco Mine, Bernic Lake, Manitoba, Canada; and Madagascar.

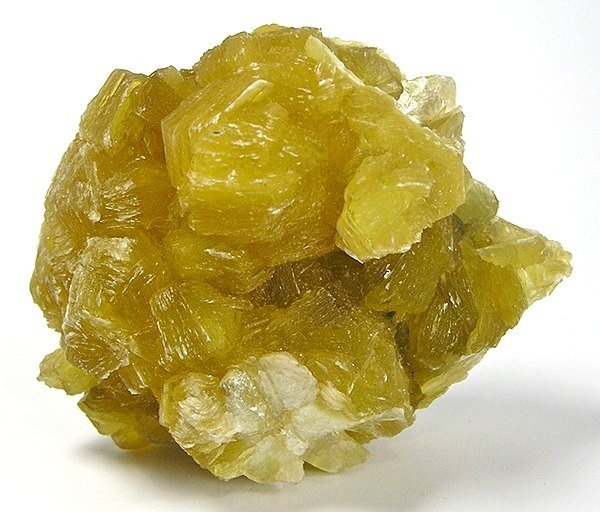
Yellow lepidolite from Itinga, Minas Gerais, Brazil. Size: 6.1 x 4.9 x 3.1 cm

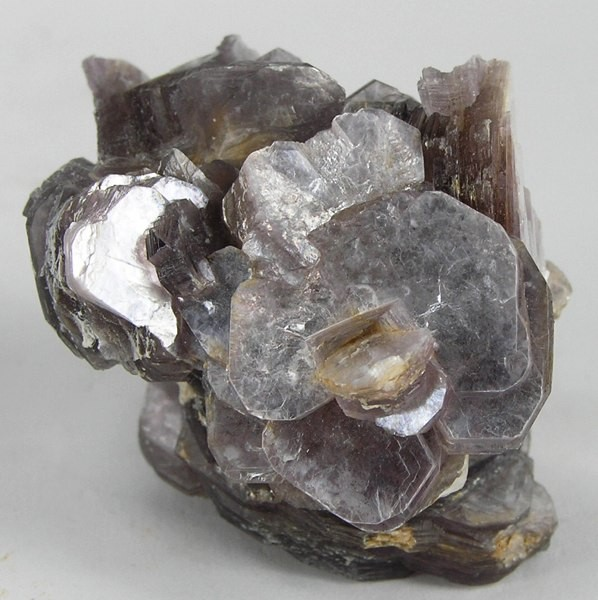
Lavender lepidolite "books" from Himalaya Mine, Mesa Grande District, San Diego County, California, US. Size: 4.8 x 3.9 x 3.5 cm

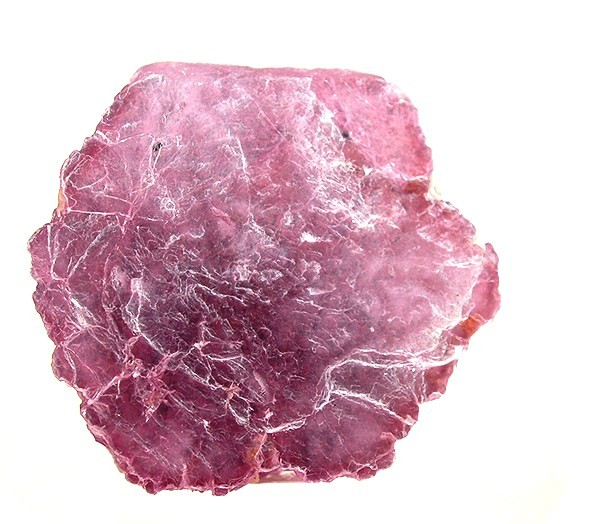
Lepidolite, Virgem da Lapa, Minas Gerais, Brazil (size 2.4 x 2.1 x 0.7 cm)

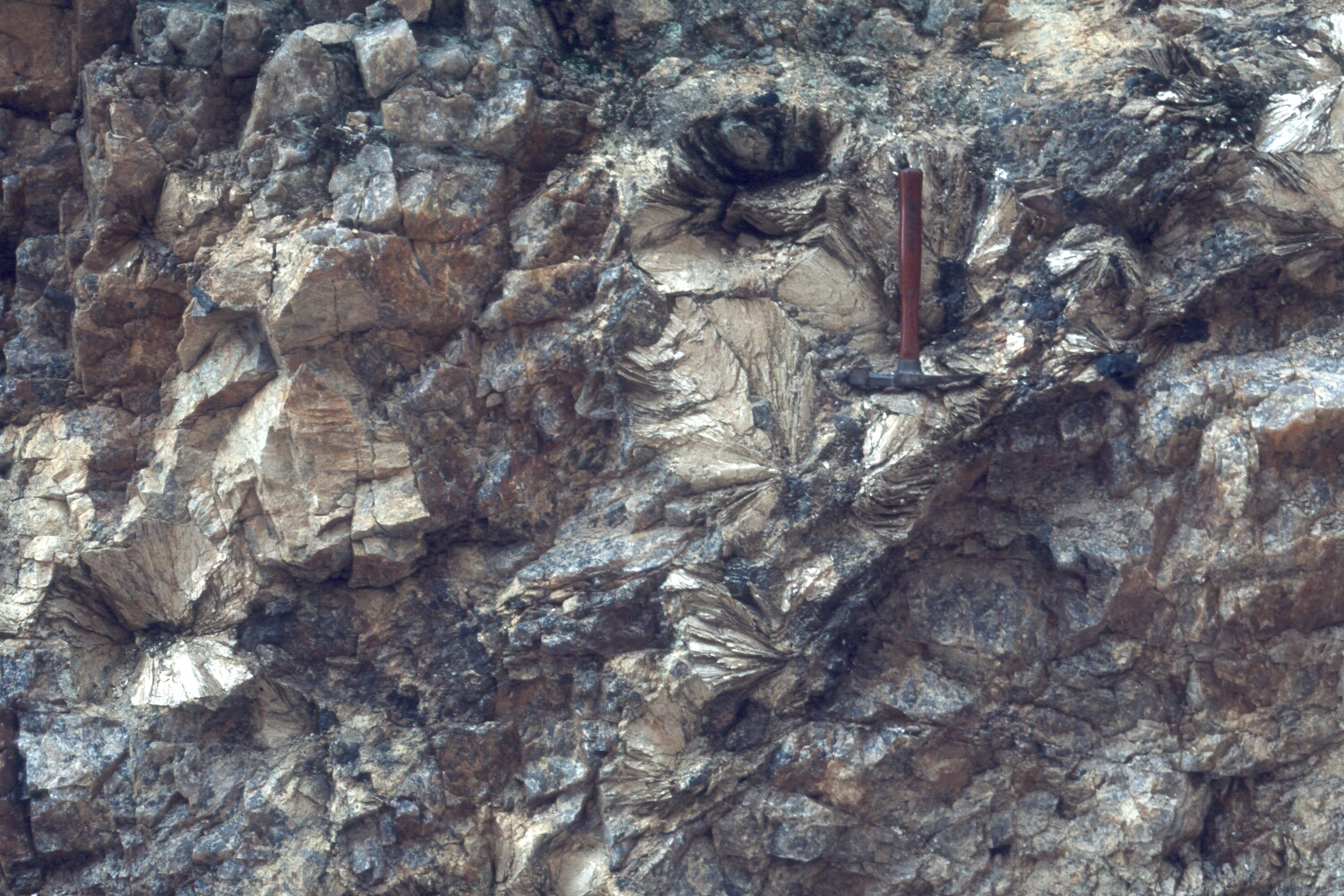
Radiating lepidolite at the White Elephant pegmatite, Black Hills, South Dakota
