= Carl Setterberg =

Swedish apothecary, commerce chemist, and industrialist

- Born: 30 April 1853; Järpås socken, Sweden
- Died: 7 April 1941 (aged 87); Stockholm, Sweden
- Education: University of Bonn; Heidelberg University; University of Jena

Carl Theodor Setterberg (30 April 1853 in Järpås socken—7 April 1941 in Stockholm), was a Swedish apothecary, commerce chemist and industrialist. He passed the apothecary exam in 1876. 1879–1891, studied at University of Bonn, Heidelberg University and University of Jena, where he became PhD in 1881. He was a founding member of Svenska Uppfinnareföreningen (The Swedish Inventors' Association) together with Salomon August Andrée, Gustaf de Laval, Otto Fahnehjelm and Ernst August Wiman in 1886, where he became honorary commissioner in 1936.

== Publications ==
- Ueber die Dastellung von Rubidium- und Cæsium-Verbindungen und über die Gewinnung der Metalle selbst (1881)
- Om några cesium- och rubidiumföreningar (1882)
- Vanadinmetallen, dess framställning och fysikaliska egenskaper (1883)

== Sources ==
- XXIII. Sällskapet Idun (biografier af A. Levertin) (in Swedish)
- Svenska män och kvinnor : biografisk uppslagsbok (in Swedish)
