= Bernic Lake =

Lake in Manitoba, Canada

- Location of the lake in Manitoba Bernic Lake (Canada)
- Location: Division No. 19, East Manitoba
- Coordinates: 50.417269°N 95.436173°W
- Basin countries: Canada

Bernic Lake is a lake in the eastern part of the province of Manitoba, Canada. It is located just southwest of Nopiming Provincial Park, and just north of Whiteshell Provincial Park.

The Tanco mine is located on the northwestern shore of the river. The mine is an active producer of caesium, tantalum and spodumene from a large pegmatite ore body.

== See also ==
- List of lakes of Manitoba
