= Petalite =

Silicate mineral, used in ceramic glazing

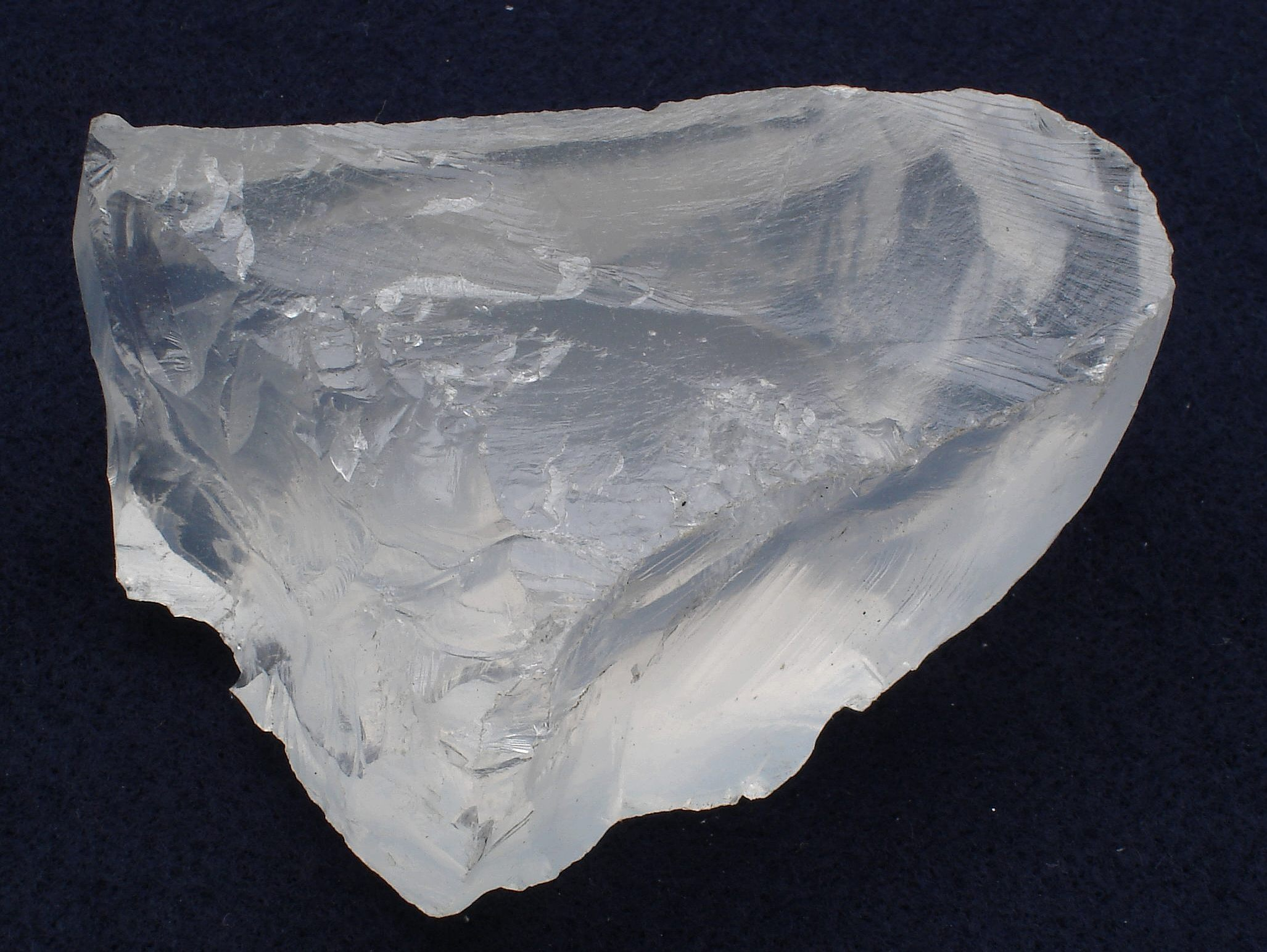
- Petalite from Minas Gerais State, Brazil (size: 3x4 cm)

General
- Category: Phyllosilicate
- Formula: LiAlSi_{4}O_{10}
- IMA symbol: Ptl
- Strunz classification: 9.EF.05
- Crystal system: Monoclinic
- Crystal class: Prismatic (2/m) (same H-M symbol)
- Space group: P2/a
- Unit cell: a = 11.737 Å, b = 5.171 Å, c = 7.63 Å; β = 112.54°; Z = 2

Identification
- Color: Colorless, grey, yellow, pink, to white
- Crystal habit: Tabular prismatic crystals and columnar masses
- Twinning: Common on {001}, lamellar
- Cleavage: Perfect on {001}, poor on {201} with 38.5° angle between the two
- Fracture: Subconchoidal
- Tenacity: Brittle
- Mohs scale hardness: 6–6.5
- Luster: Vitreous, pearly on cleavages
- Streak: Colorless
- Diaphaneity: Transparent to translucent
- Specific gravity: 2.4
- Optical properties: Biaxial (+)
- Refractive index: n_{α} = 1.504, n_{β} = 1.510, n_{γ} = 1.516
- Birefringence: δ = 0.012
- 2V angle: 82–84° measured
- Melting point: 1350 °C
- Fusibility: 5
- Solubility: Insoluble

Petalite, also known as castorite, is a lithium aluminum phyllosilicate mineral LiAlSi_{4}O_{10}, crystallizing in the monoclinic system. Petalite occurs as colorless, pink, grey, yellow, yellow grey, to white tabular crystals and columnar masses. It occurs in lithium-bearing pegmatites with spodumene, lepidolite, and tourmaline. Petalite is an important ore of lithium, and is converted to spodumene and quartz by heating to ~500 °C and under 3 kbar of pressure in the presence of a dense hydrous alkali borosilicate fluid with a minor carbonate component. Petalite (and secondary spodumene formed from it) is lower in iron than primary spodumene, making it a more useful source of lithium in, e.g., the production of glass. The colorless varieties are often used as gemstones.

Petalite is significant because the element lithium was originally identified from petalite in Sweden in 1817. The element was named 'lithium,' from the greek word for 'stone', because it had been found in petalite.

== Discovery and occurrence ==
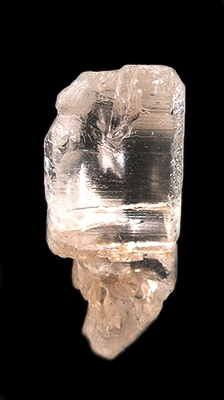
Petalite from Paprok, Nuristan Province, Afghanistan (size: 7.3 × 2.9 × 2.4 cm)

Petalite was discovered in 1800, by Brazilian naturalist and statesman Jose Bonifacio de Andrada e Silva. Type locality: Utö Island, Haninge, Stockholm, Sweden. The name is derived from the Greek word petalon, which means leaf, alluding to its perfect cleavage.

Economic deposits of petalite are found near Kalgoorlie, Western Australia; Aracuai, Minas Gerais, Brazil; Karibib, Namibia; Manitoba, Canada; and Bikita, Zimbabwe.

The first important economic application for petalite was as a raw material for the glass-ceramic cooking ware CorningWare. It has been used as a raw material for ceramic glazes.
