= Amblygonite =

Phosphate mineral

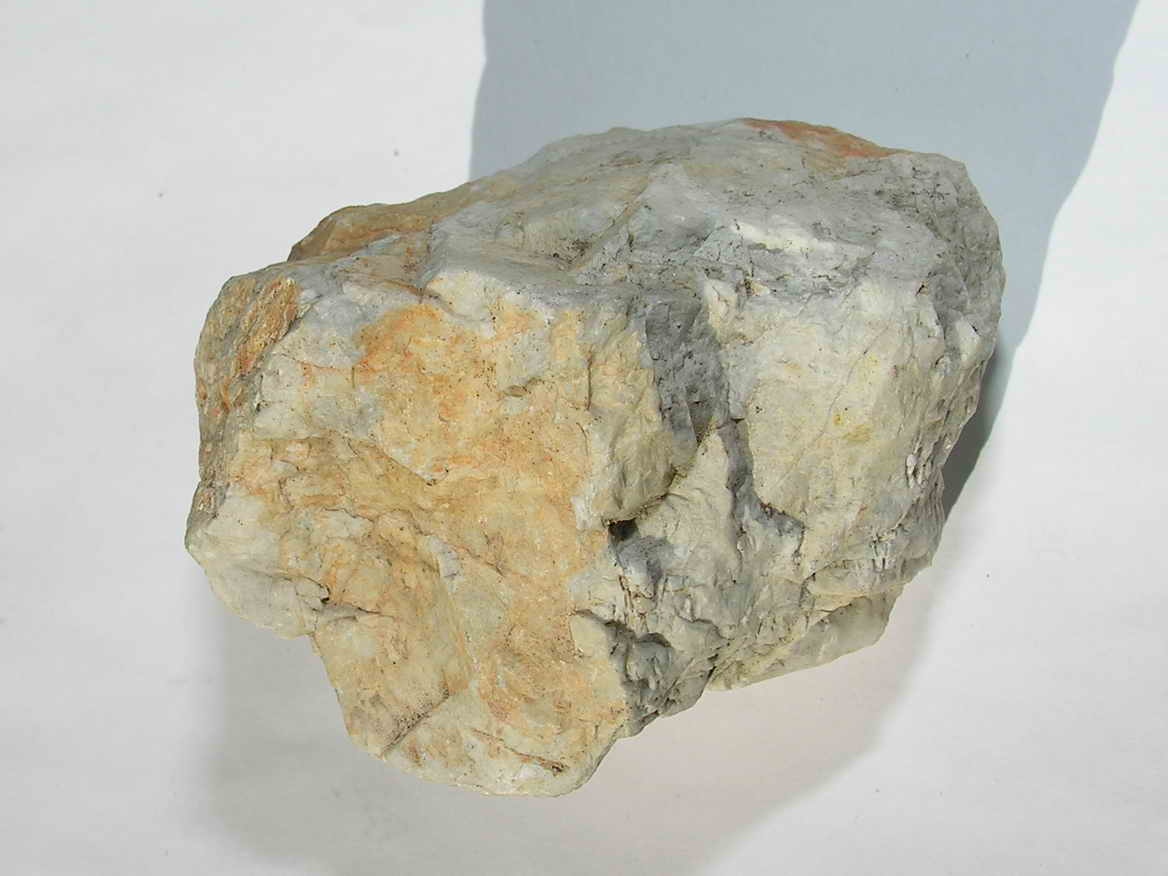

General
- Category: Phosphate minerals
- Formula: (Li,Na)AlPO_{4}(F,OH)
- IMA symbol: Aby
- Strunz classification: 8.BB.05
- Crystal system: Triclinic
- Crystal class: Pinacoidal (1̅) (same H-M symbol)
- Space group: C1̅

Identification
- Color: Generally white or creamy, but can also be colorless or pale yellow, green, blue, beige, gray, brown or pink.
- Crystal habit: Prismatic to columnar form
- Twinning: Microscopic polysynthetic twinning common
- Cleavage: [100] Perfect, [110] good, [011] distinct
- Fracture: Irregular/ineven, sub-Conchoidal
- Mohs scale hardness: 5.5–6
- Luster: Vitreous to pearly
- Specific gravity: 2.98–3.11
- Polish luster: greasy to vitreous (in gem material)
- Optical properties: Double refractive, biaxial, may be either positive or negative
- Refractive index: n_{a}=1.577 – 1.591, n_{b}=1.592 – 1.605, n_{c}=1.596 – 1.613
- Birefringence: .020 – .027
- Pleochroism: weak to none
- Ultraviolet fluorescence: very weak green in long wave, light blue phosphorescence in long wave and short wave

Amblygonite (/æmˈblɪɡəˌnaɪt/) is a fluorophosphate mineral, (Li,Na)AlPO_{4}(F,OH), composed of lithium, sodium, aluminium, phosphate, fluoride and hydroxide. The mineral occurs in pegmatite deposits and is easily mistaken for albite and other feldspars. Its density, cleavage and flame test for lithium are diagnostic. Amblygonite forms a series with montebrasite, the low fluorine endmember. Geologic occurrence is in granite pegmatites, high-temperature tin veins, and greisens. Amblygonite occurs with spodumene, apatite, lepidolite, tourmaline, and other lithium-bearing minerals in pegmatite veins. It contains about 10% lithium, and has been utilized as a source of lithium. The chief commercial sources have historically been the deposits of California and France.

== History ==
The mineral was first discovered in Saxony by August Breithaupt in 1817, and named by him from the Greek amblus, blunt, and gonia, angle, because of the obtuse angle between the cleavages. Later it was found at Montebras, Creuse, France, and at Hebron in Maine; and because of slight differences in optical character and chemical composition the names montebrasite and hebronite have been applied to the mineral from these localities.The term amblygonite has been used interchangeably in mining, whether this mineral or montebrasite was extracted. In fact, montebrasite is much more common than amblygonite, which is a rare mineral. It has been discovered in considerable quantity at Pala in San Diego county, California; Caceres, Spain; and the Black Hills of South Dakota. A blue form of amblygonite-montebrasite has been described from Rwanda. The largest documented single crystal of amblygonite measured 7.62 × 2.44 × 1.83 m and weighed about 102 tons.

== Gemology ==
Transparent amblygonite has been faceted and used as a gemstone. As a gemstone set into jewelry it is vulnerable to breakage and abrasion from general wear, as its hardness and toughness are poor. The main sources for gem material are Brazil and the United States. Australia, France, Germany, Namibia, and Norway, and Spain have also produced gem quality amblygonite.

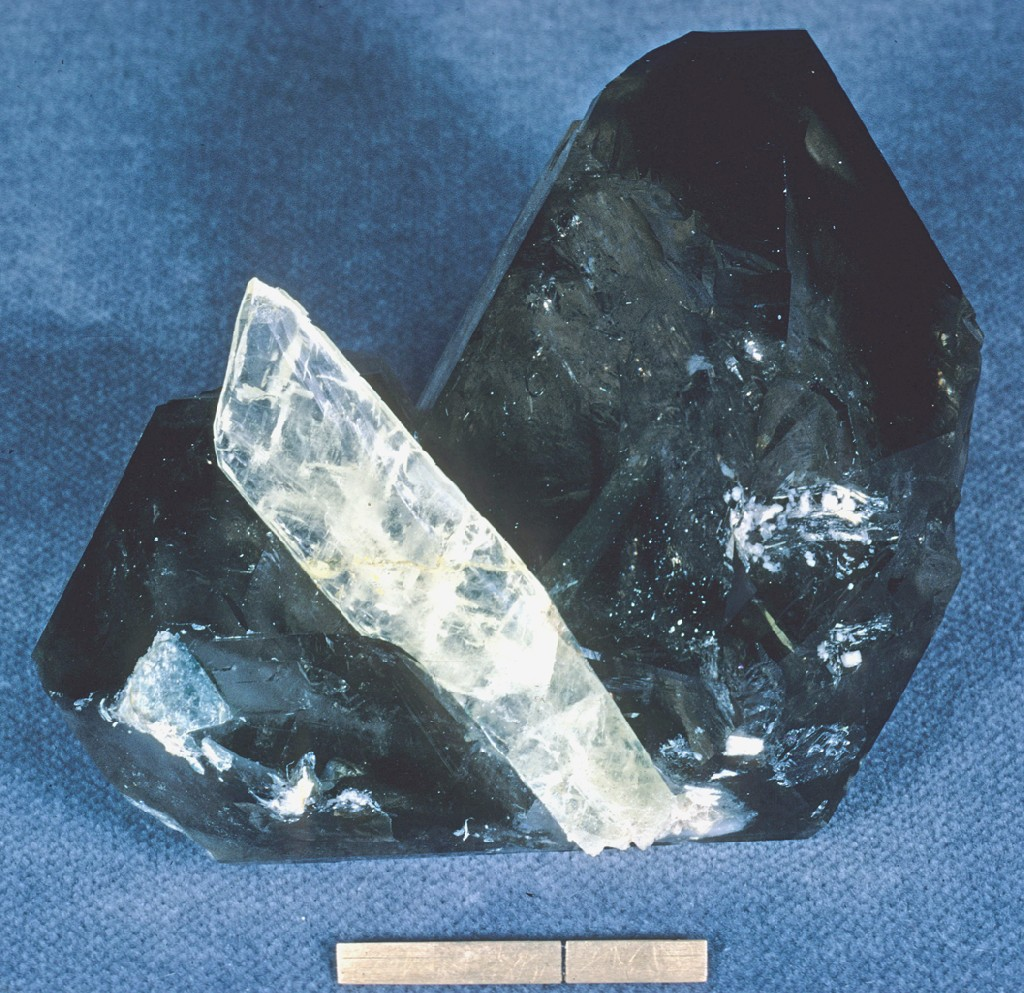
Amblygonite from Taquaral, Itinga, Minas Gerais, Brazil. Scale at bottom is one inch, with a vertical line at one cm.

== See also ==
- List of minerals
