= Sodalite =

Blue tectosilicate mineral

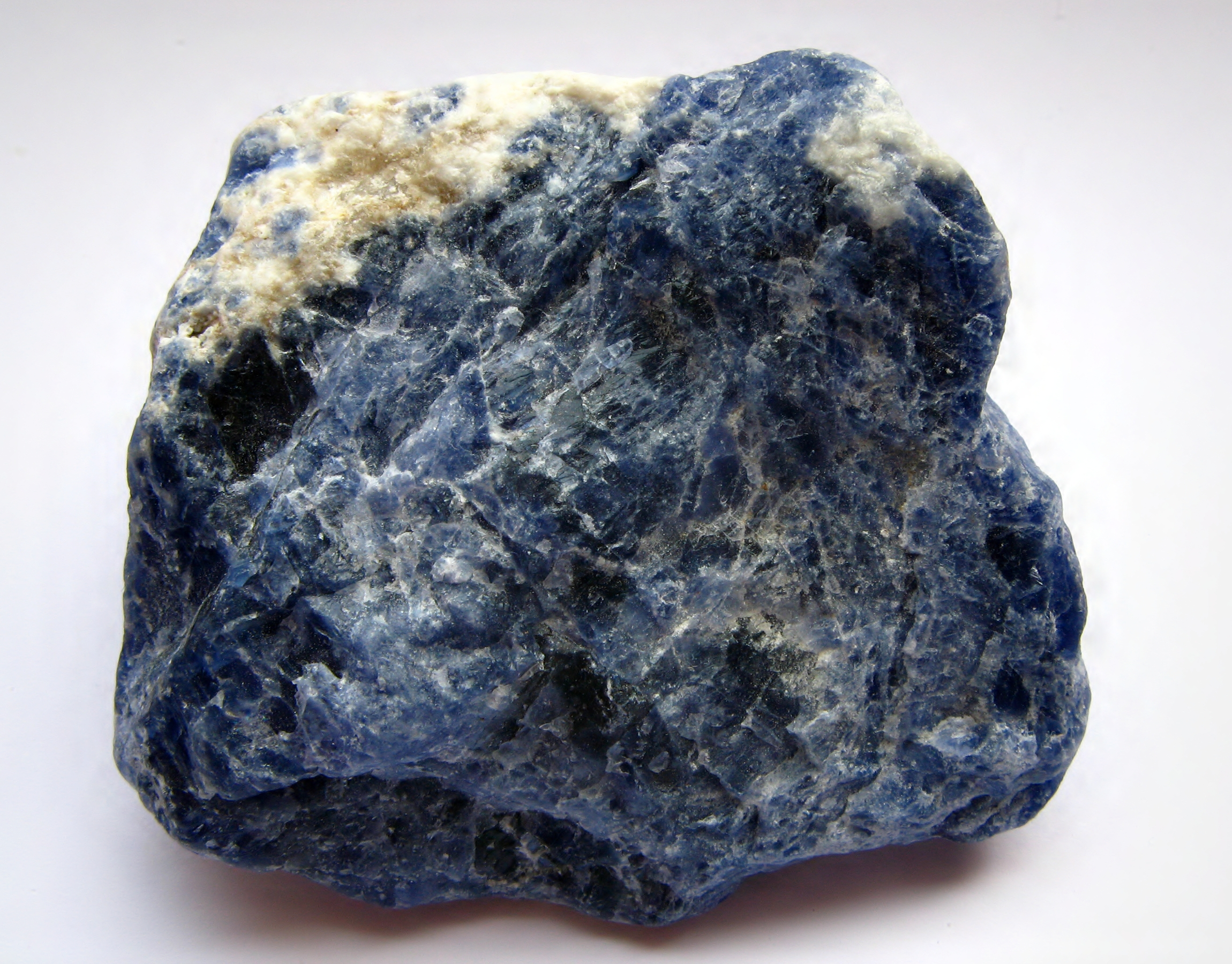

General
- Category: Tectosilicate minerals
- Group: Feldspathoid group, sodalite group
- Formula: Na_{8}(Al_{6}Si_{6}O_{24})Cl_{2}
- IMA symbol: Sdl
- Strunz classification: 9.FB.10
- Crystal system: Cubic
- Crystal class: Hextetrahedral (4̅3m); H–M symbol: (4̅ 3m)
- Space group: P4̅3n
- Unit cell: a = 8.876(6) Å; Z = 1

Identification
- Color: Indigo, grey blue, green, yellow, violet, white veining common
- Crystal habit: Massive; rarely as dodecahedra
- Twinning: Common on {111} forming pseudohexagonal prisms
- Cleavage: Poor on {110}
- Fracture: Conchoidal to uneven
- Tenacity: Brittle
- Mohs scale hardness: 5.5–6
- Luster: Dull vitreous to greasy
- Streak: White
- Diaphaneity: Transparent to translucent
- Specific gravity: 2.27–2.33
- Optical properties: Isotropic
- Refractive index: n = 1.483 – 1.487
- Ultraviolet fluorescence: Bright red-orange cathodoluminescence and fluorescence under LW and SW UV, with yellowish phosphorescence; may be photochromic in magentas
- Fusibility: Easily to a colourless glass; sodium yellow flame
- Solubility: Soluble in hydrochloric acid and nitric acid

Major varieties
- Hackmanite: Tenebrescent; violet-red or green fading to white

Sodalite (/ˈsoʊ.dəˌlaɪt/ SOH-də-lyte) is a tectosilicate mineral with the formula Na_{8}(Al_{6}Si_{6}O_{24})Cl_{2}, with indigo and grey blue varieties widely used as an ornamental gemstone. Although massive sodalite samples are opaque, crystals are usually transparent to translucent. Sodalite is a member of the sodalite group with hauyne, nosean, lazurite and tugtupite.

The people of the Caral culture traded for sodalite from the Collao altiplano (Andean Plateau). First discovered by Europeans in 1811 in the Ilimaussaq intrusive complex in Greenland, sodalite did not become widely important as an ornamental stone until 1891 when vast deposits of fine material were discovered in Ontario, Canada.

== Structure ==
The structure of sodalite was first studied by Linus Pauling in 1930. It is a cubic mineral of space group P4̅3n (space group 218) which consists of an aluminosilicate cage network with Na^{+} cations and chloride anions in the interframework. (There may be small amounts of other cations and anions instead.) This framework forms a zeolite cage structure. Each unit cell has two cavities, which have almost the same structure as the borate cage (B_{24}O_{48})^{24−} found in the zinc borate Zn_{4}O(BO_{2})_{6}, the beryllosilicate cage (Be_{12}Si_{12}O_{48})^{24−}, and the aluminate cage (Al_{24}O_{48})^{24−} in Ca_{8}(Al_{12}O_{24})(WO_{4})_{2}, and as in the similar mineral tugtupite (Na_{4}AlBeSi_{4}O_{12}Cl) (see Haüyne#Sodalite group). There is one cavity around each chloride ion. One chloride is located at the corners of the unit cell, and the other at the centre. Each cavity has chiral tetrahedral symmetry, and the cavities around these two chloride locations are mirror images one of the other (a glide plane or a four-fold improper rotation takes one into the other). There are four sodium ions around each chloride ion (at one distance, and four more at a greater distance), surrounded by twelve SiO_{4} tetrahedra and twelve AlO_{4} tetrahedra. The silicon and aluminum atoms are located at the corners of a truncated octahedron with the chloride and four sodium atoms inside. (A similar structure called "carbon sodalite" may occur as a very high pressure form of carbon — see illustration in reference.) Each oxygen atom links between an SiO_{4} tetrahedron and an AlO_{4} tetrahedron. All the oxygen atoms are equivalent, but one half are in environments that are enantiomorphic to the environments of the other half. The silicon atoms are at the location $(0, 1/2, 1/4)$ and symmetry-equivalent positions, and the aluminum ions at the location $(1/2, 0, 1/4)$and symmetry-equivalent positions. The three silicon atoms and the three aluminum atoms listed above closest to a given corner of the unit cell form a six-membered ring of tetrahedra, and the four in any face of the unit cell form a four-membered ring of tetrahedra. The six-membered rings can serve as channels in which ions can diffuse through the crystal.

The structure is a crumpled form of a structure in which the three-fold axes of each tetrahedron lie in planes parallel to the faces of the unit cell, thus putting half the oxygen atoms in the faces. As the temperature is raised the sodalite structure expands and uncrumples, becoming more like this structure. In this structure the two cavities are still chiral, because no indirect isometry centred on the cavity (i.e. a reflexion, inversion, or improper rotation) can superimpose the silicon atoms onto silicon atoms and the aluminum atoms onto aluminum atoms, while also superimposing the sodium atoms on other sodium atoms. A discontinuity of the thermal expansion coefficient occurs at a certain temperature when chloride is replaced by sulfate or iodide, and this is thought to happen when the framework becomes fully expanded or when the cation (sodium in natural sodalite) reaches the coordinates $(1/4, 1/4, 1/4)$ (et cetera). This adds symmetry (such as mirror planes in the faces of the unit cell) so that the space group becomes Pm3̅n (space group 223), and the cavities cease to be chiral and take on pyritohedral symmetry. Natural sodalite holds primarily chloride anions in the cages, but they can be substituted by other anions such as sulfate, sulfide, hydroxide, trisulfur with other minerals in the sodalite group representing end member compositions. The sodium can be replaced by other alkali group elements, and the chloride by other halides. Many of these have been synthesized.

The characteristic blue color arises mainly from caged S^{−}_{3} and S_{4} clusters.

== Properties ==
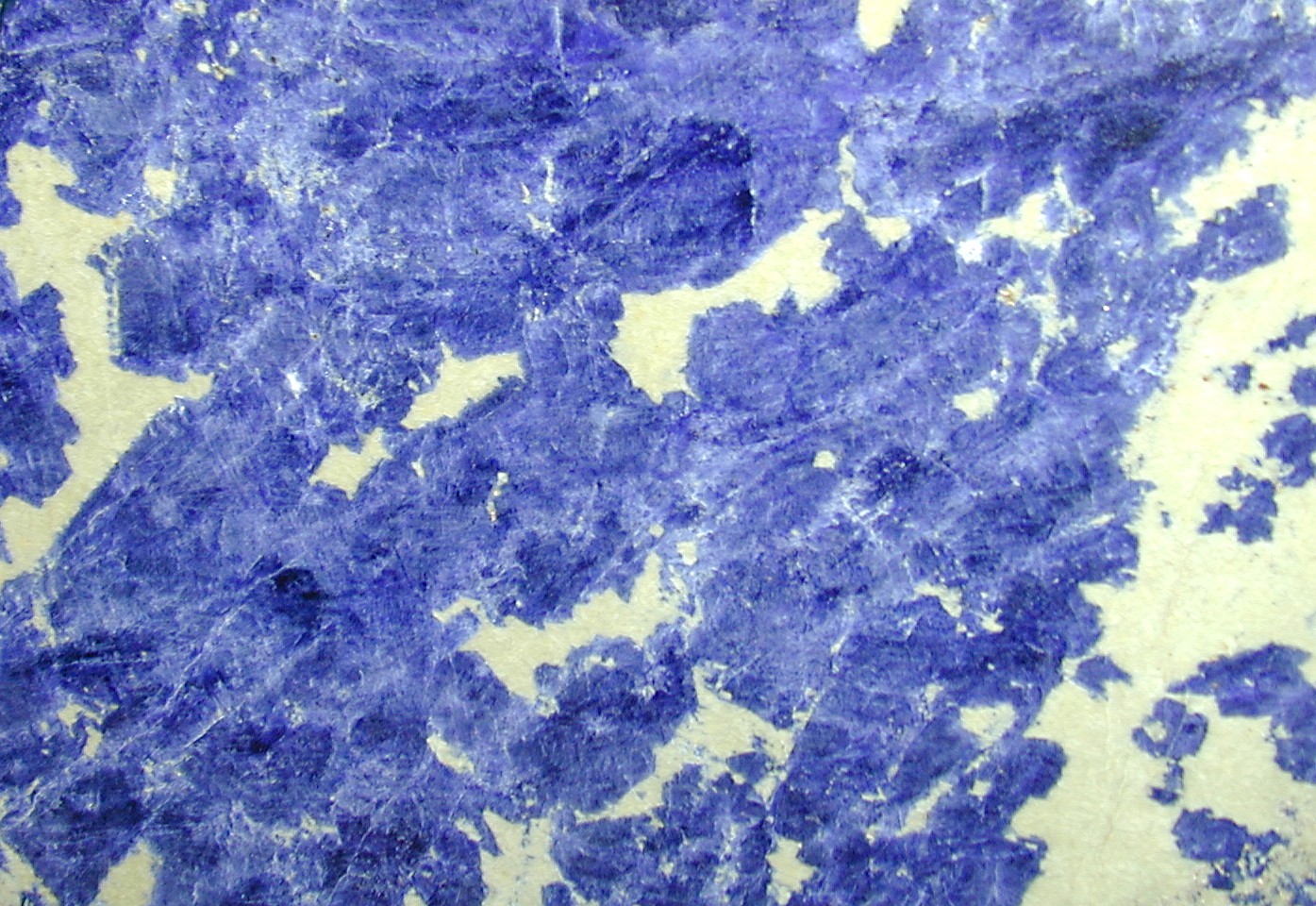
A sample of sodalite-carbonate pegmatite from Bolivia, with a polished rock surface.

A light, relatively hard yet fragile mineral, sodalite is named after its sodium content; in mineralogy it may be classed as a feldspathoid. Well known for its blue color, sodalite may also be grey, yellow, green, or pink and is often mottled with white veins or patches. The more uniformly blue material is used in jewellery, where it is fashioned into cabochons and beads. Lesser material is more often seen as facing or inlay in various applications.

Although somewhat similar to lazurite and lapis lazuli, sodalite rarely contains pyrite (a common inclusion in lapis), and its blue color is more like traditional Indigo rather than ultramarine. It is further distinguished from similar minerals by its white (rather than blue) streak. Sodalite's six directions of poor cleavage may be seen as incipient cracks running through the stone.

Most sodalite will fluoresce orange under ultraviolet light, and hackmanite exhibits tenebrescence, a change in color intensity when exposed to light or left in the dark, a form of photochromism.

Stereo image
Left frame
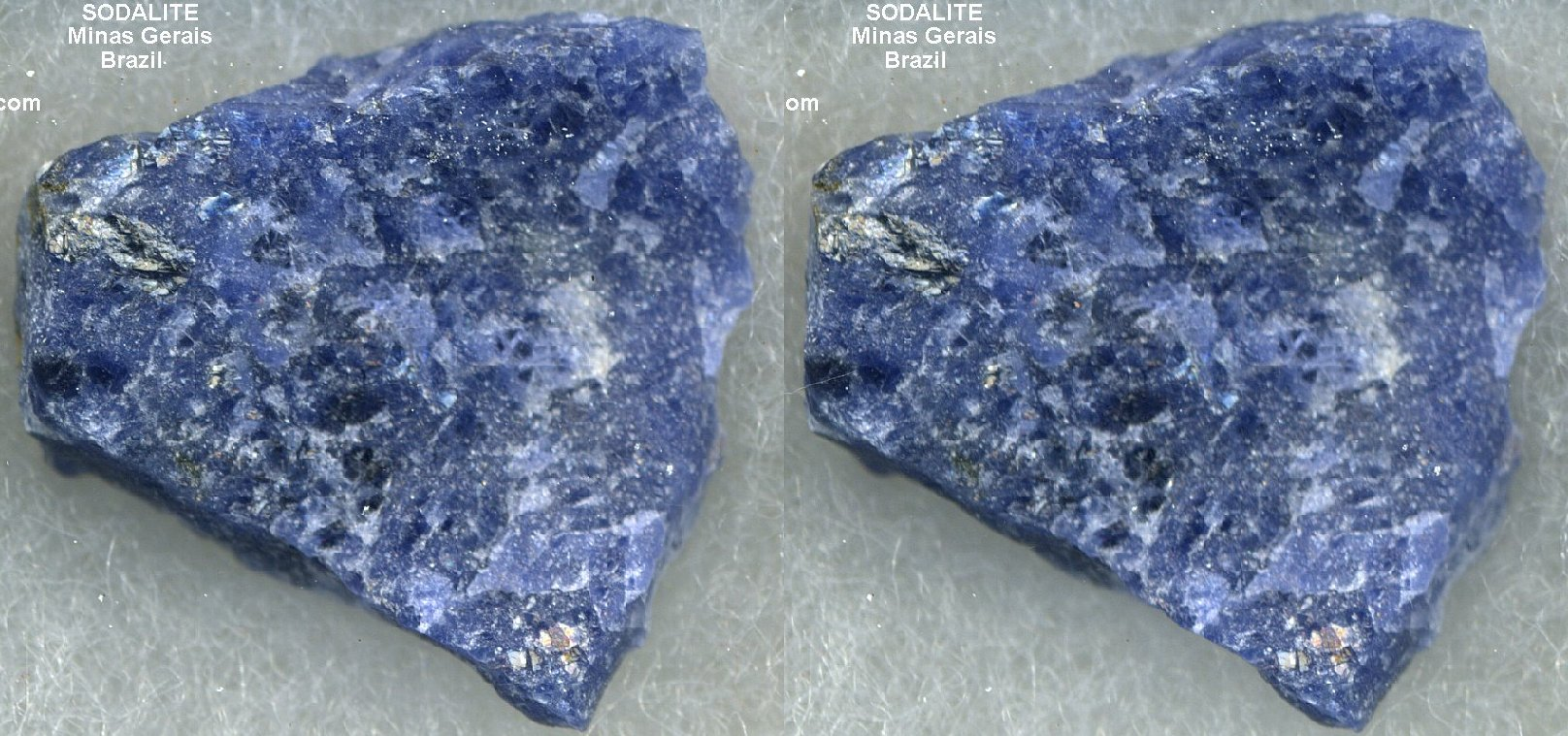
Right frame
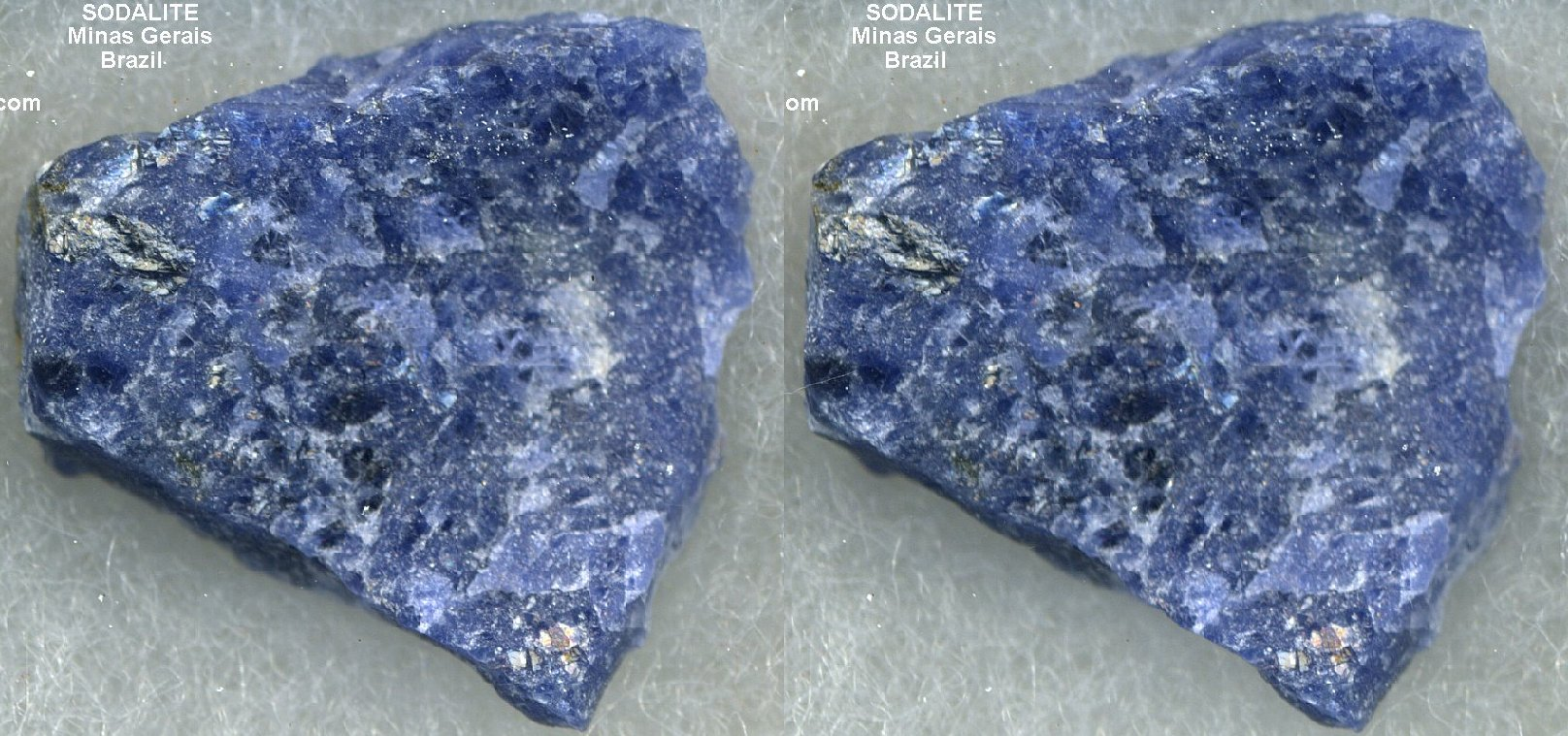
Parallel view
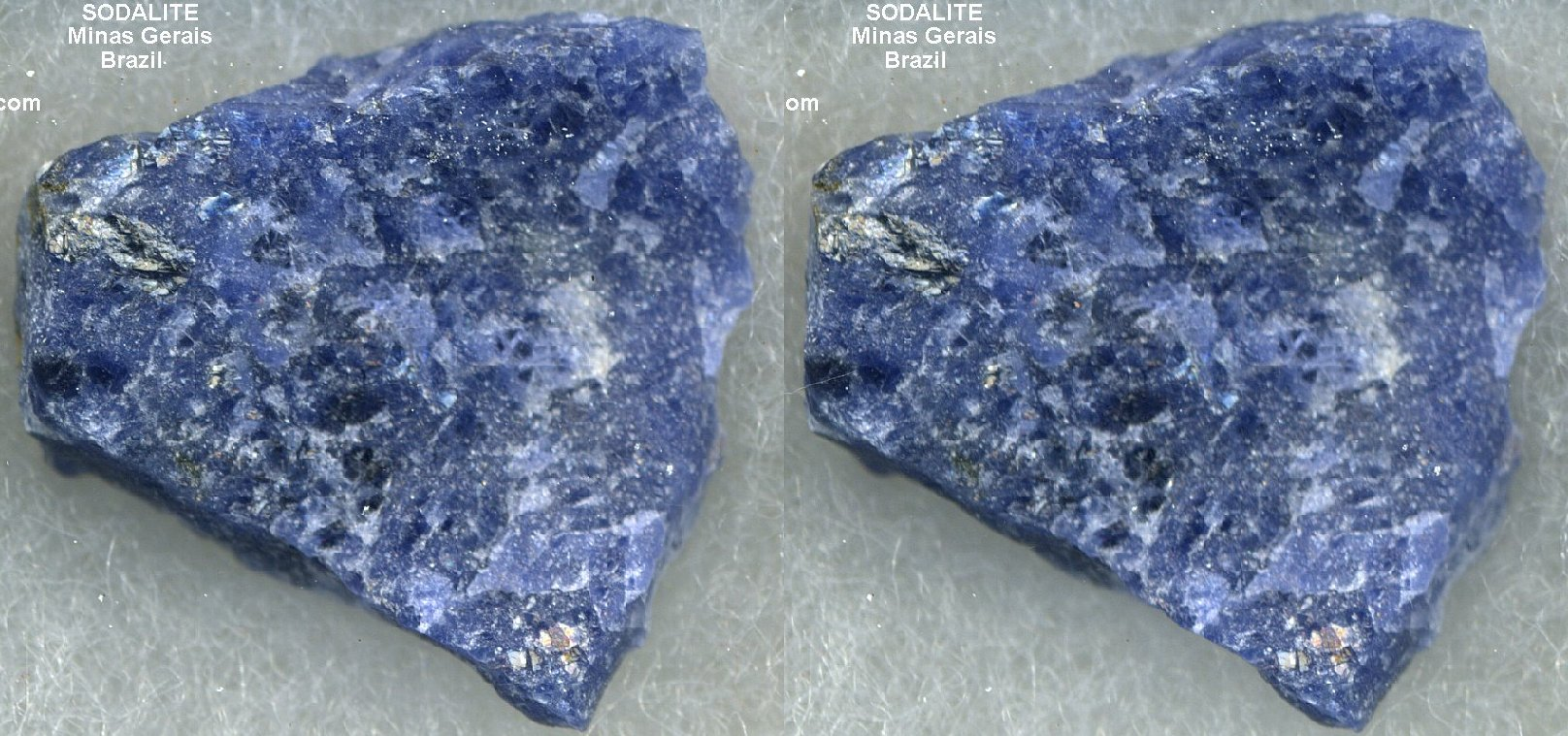
Cross-eye view
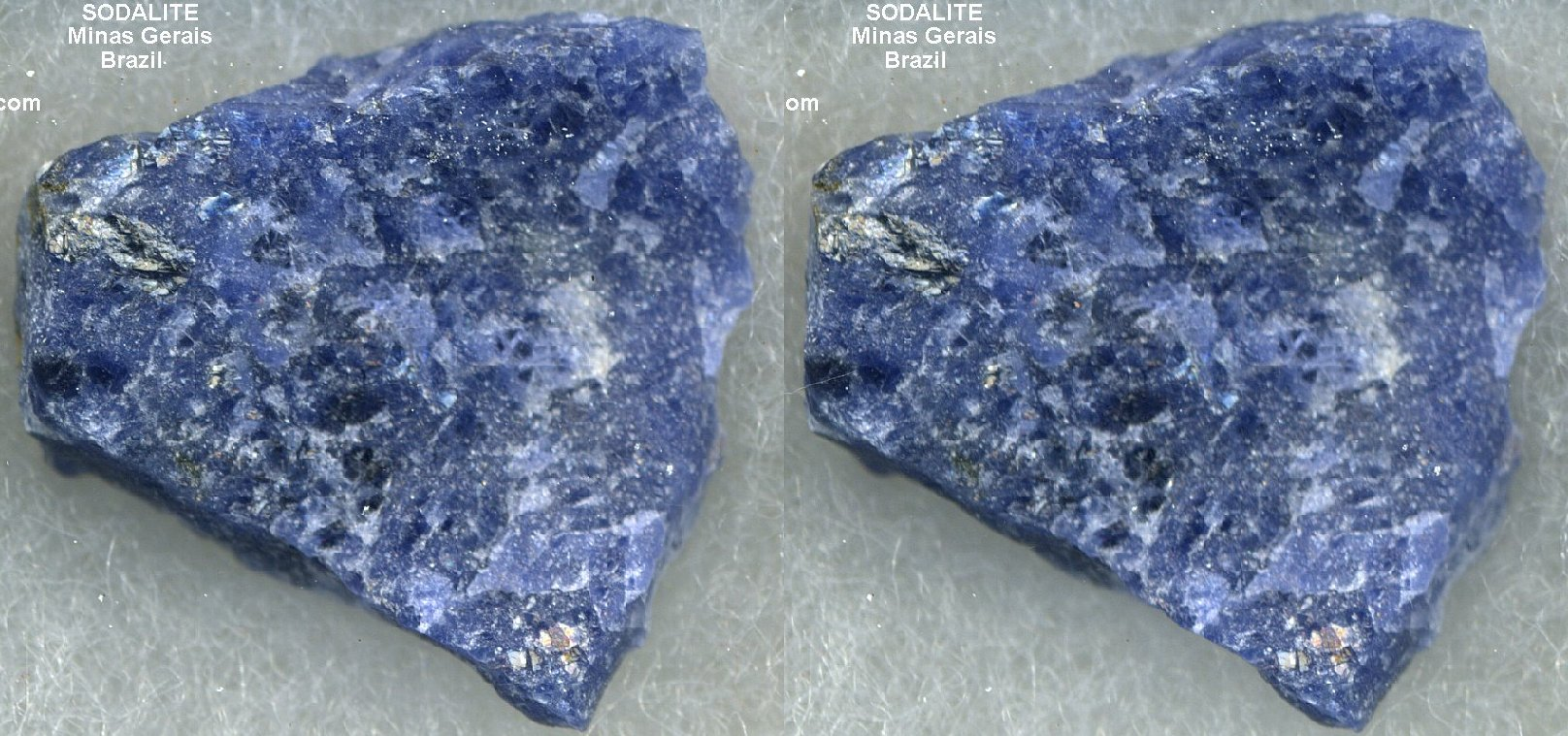

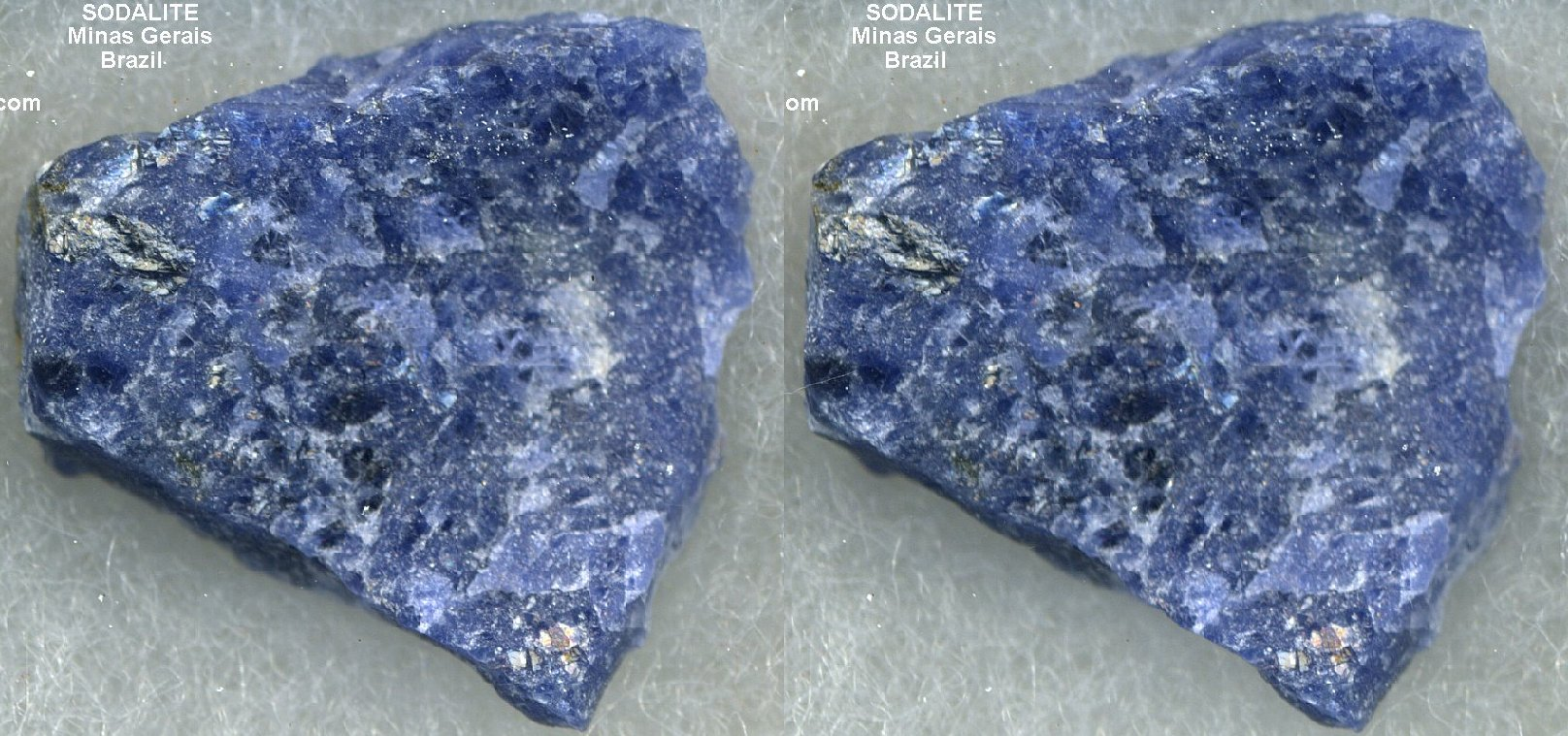
- Small specimen of sodalite from Brazil.

== Hackmanite ==
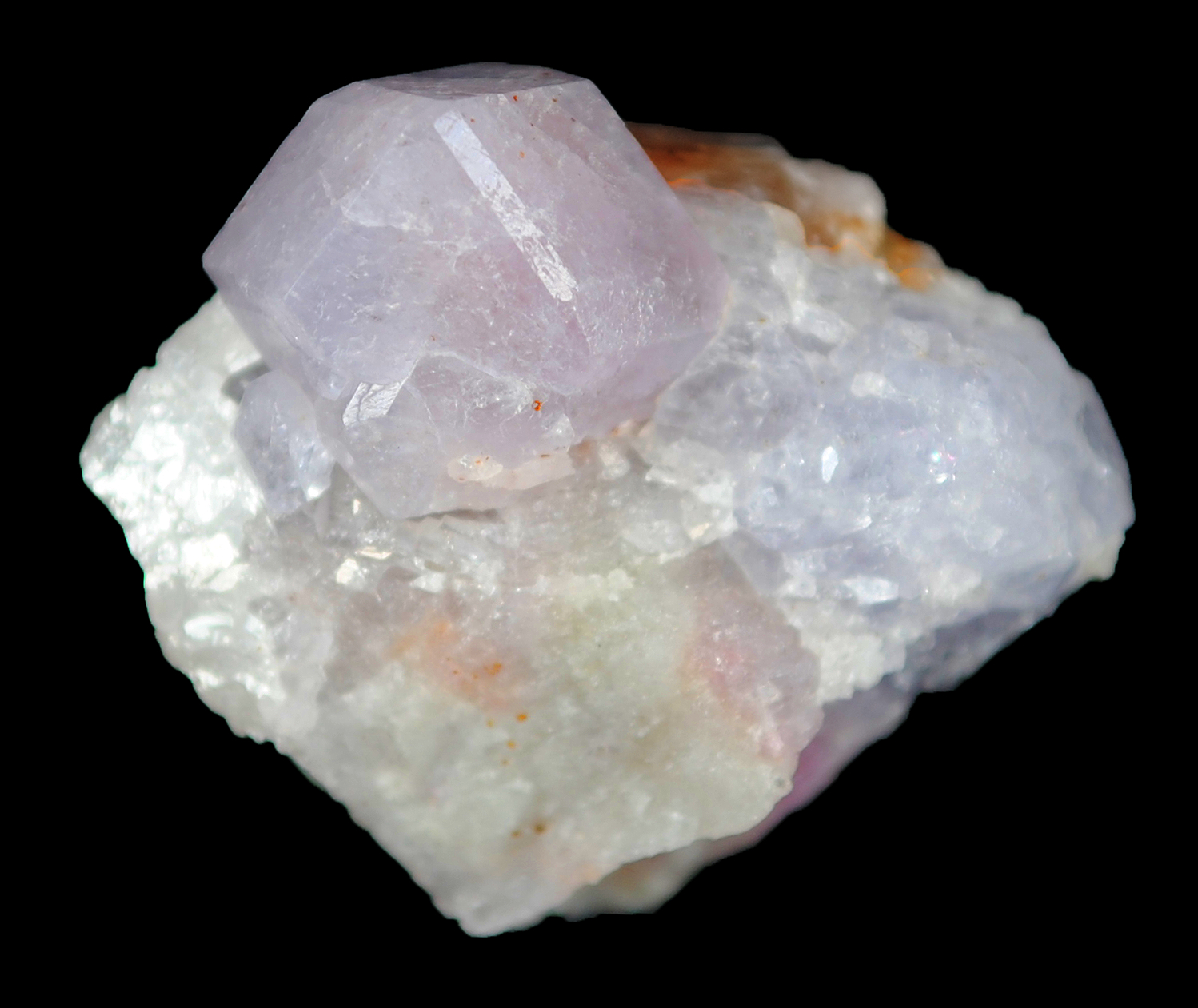
Hackmanite dodecahedron from the Koksha Valley, Afghanistan

Hackmanite is a variety of sodalite exhibiting tenebrescence. When hackmanite from Mont Saint-Hilaire (Quebec) or Ilímaussaq (Greenland) is freshly quarried, it is generally pale to deep violet but the color fades quickly to greyish or greenish white. Conversely, hackmanite from Afghanistan and the Myanmar Republic starts off creamy white but develops a violet to pink-red color in sunlight. If left in a dark environment for some time, the violet will fade again. Tenebrescence is accelerated by the use of longwave or, particularly, shortwave ultraviolet light.

== Occurrence ==
Sodalite was first described in 1811 for the occurrence in its type locality in the Ilimaussaq complex, Narsaq, West Greenland.

Occurring typically in massive form, sodalite is found as vein fillings in plutonic igneous rocks such as nepheline syenites. It is associated with other minerals typical of silica-undersaturated environments, namely leucite, cancrinite and natrolite. Other associated minerals include nepheline, titanian andradite, aegirine, microcline, sanidine, albite, calcite, fluorite, ankerite and baryte.

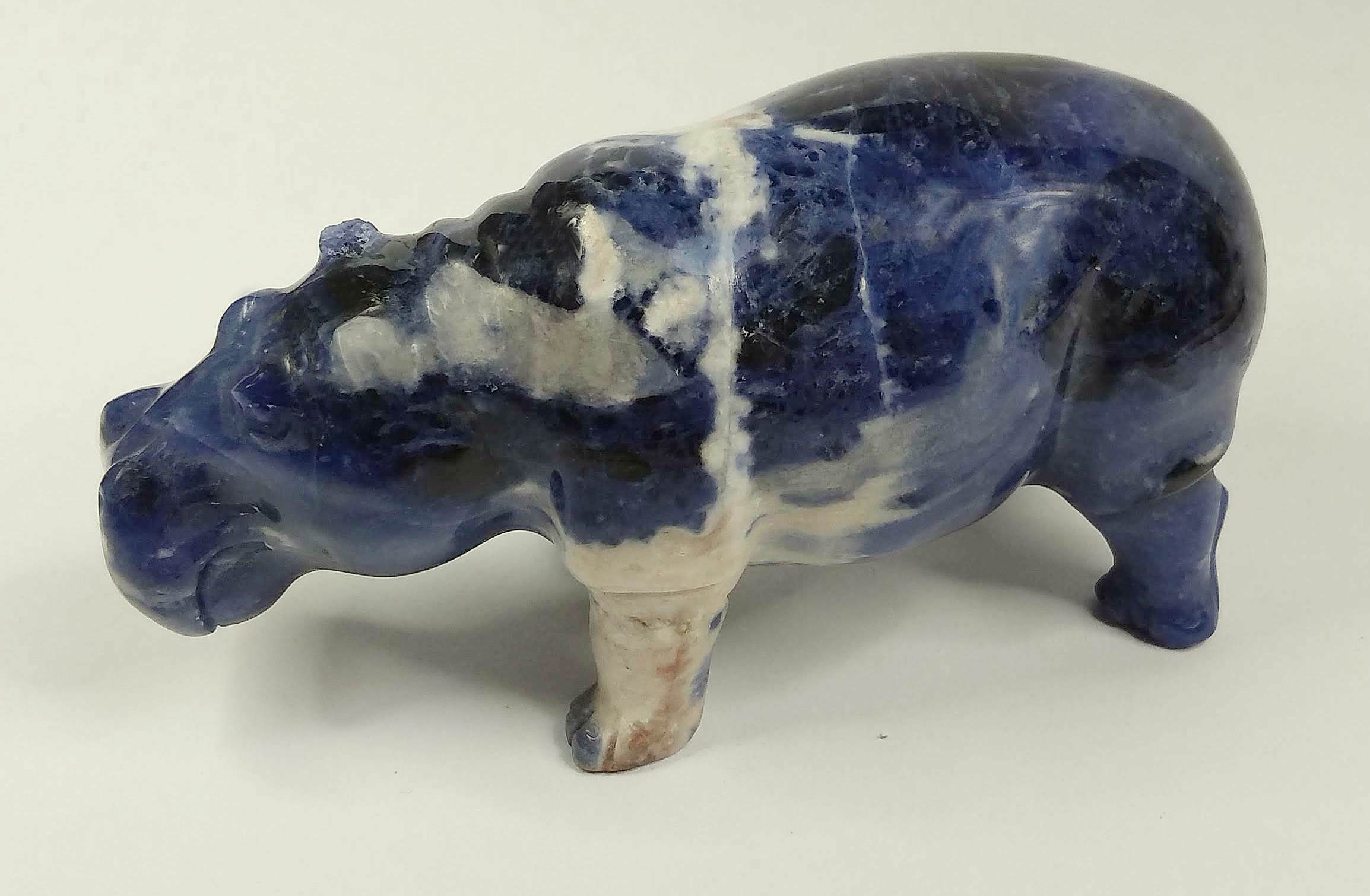
Hippo in sodalite, length 9 cm (3.5 in)

Significant deposits of fine material are restricted to but a few locales: Bancroft, Ontario (Princess Sodalite Mine), and Mont-Saint-Hilaire, Quebec, in Canada; and Litchfield, Maine, and Magnet Cove, Arkansas, in the US. The Ice River complex, near Golden, British Columbia, contains sodalite. Smaller deposits are found in South America (Brazil and Bolivia), Portugal, Romania, Burma and Russia. Hackmanite is found principally in Mont-Saint-Hilaire and Greenland.

Euhedral, transparent crystals are present in northern Namibia and in the lavas of Vesuvius, Italy.

Sodalitite is a type of extrusive igneous rock rich in sodalite. Its intrusive equivalent is sodalitolite.

== History ==
The people of the Caral culture traded for sodalite from the Collao altiplano.

== Synthesis ==
The mesoporous cage structure of sodalite makes it useful as a container material for many anions. Some of the anions known to have been included in sodalite-structure materials include nitrate, iodide, iodate, permanganate, perchlorate, and perrhenate.

== See also ==
- Labradorite
- Opal
