= Lapis lazuli =

Metamorphic rock containing lazurite, prized for its intense blue color

- Metamorphic rock
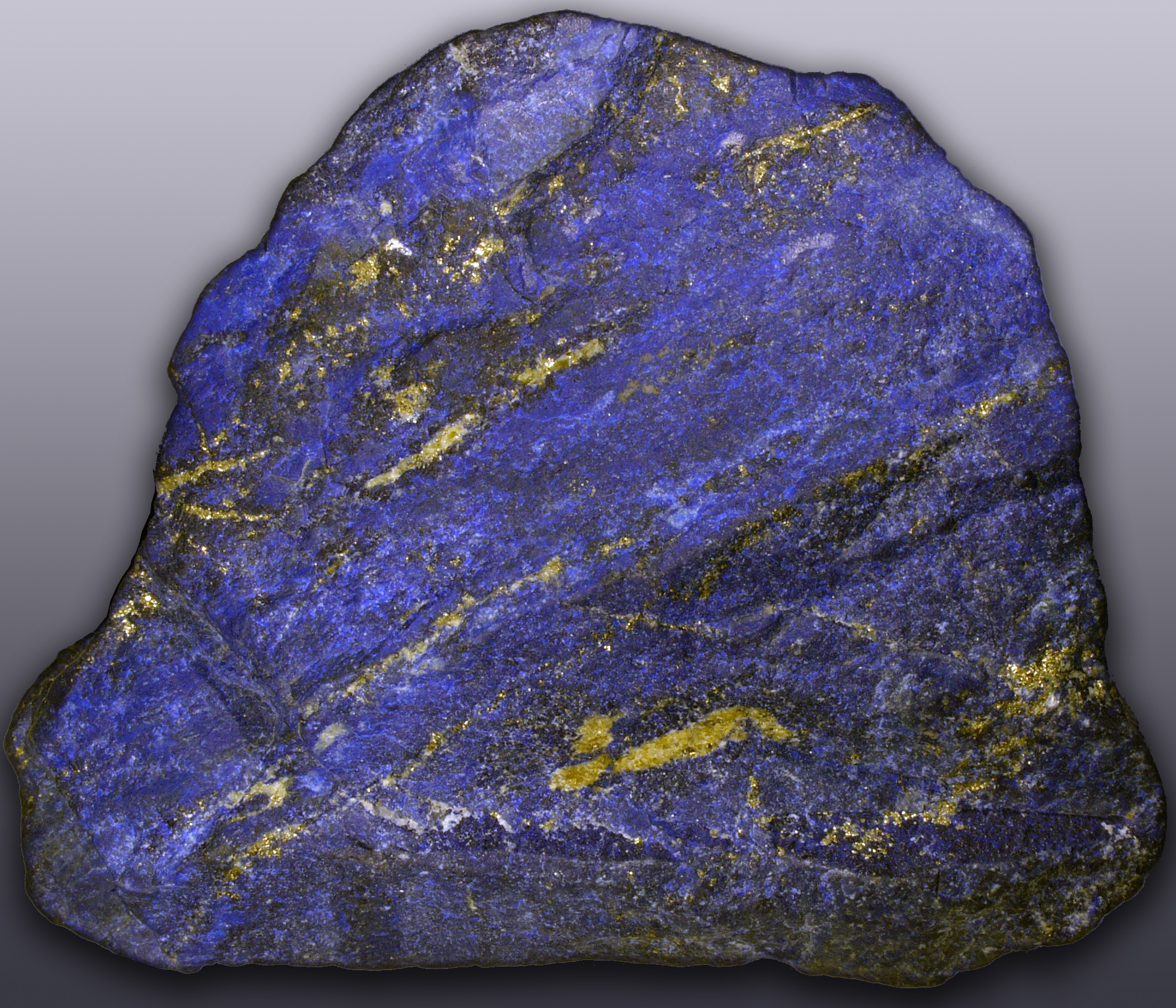
- Lapis lazuli in its natural state, with pyrite inclusions (specimen from Afghanistan)

Composition
- Primary: Feldspathoids (lazurite and haüyne)
- Secondary: Calcite, pyrite, diopside, forsterite

Lapis lazuli (UK: /ˌlæpɪs ˈlæz(j)ʊli, ˈlæʒʊ-, -ˌli, -ˌlʌɪ/; US: /ˈlæz(j)əli, ˈlæʒə-, -ˌliˌ læˈzuːli/) is a deep-blue metamorphic rock used as a semi-precious stone that has been prized since antiquity for its intense color. Its name originates from the Persian word for the gem, lāžward, and serves as the root for the word for "blue" in several languages, including Spanish and Portuguese azul and English azure. Lapis lazuli is a rock composed primarily of the minerals lazurite, pyrite, diopside, and calcite. As early as the 7th millennium BC, lapis lazuli was mined in the Sar-i Sang mines, in Shortugai, and in other mines in Badakhshan province in modern northeast Afghanistan. Lapis lazuli artifacts, dated to 7570 BC, have been found at Bhirrana, which is the oldest site of Indus Valley Civilisation. Lapis was highly valued by the Indus Valley Civilisation (3300–1900 BC). Lapis beads have been found at Neolithic burials in Mehrgarh, the Caucasus, and as far away as Mauritania. It was used in the funeral mask of Tutankhamun (1341–1323 BC).

By the end of the Middle Ages, Europe began importing lapis lazuli to grind it into powder and make ultramarine pigment. Ultramarine was used by some of the most important artists of the Renaissance and Baroque, including Masaccio, Perugino, Titian and Vermeer; it was often reserved for the clothing of the central figures of their paintings, especially the Virgin Mary. Ultramarine has also been found in dental tartar of medieval nuns and scribes, perhaps as a result of licking their painting brushes while producing medieval texts and manuscripts.

== History ==
Excavations from Tepe Gawra show that lapis lazuli was introduced to Mesopotamia approximately in the late Ubaid period, c. 4900–4000 BCE. It became there the chief material for magic stones. A traditional understanding was that the Lapis lazuli was mined some 1,500 miles to the east – in Badakhshan. Indeed, the Persian لاژورد lāžavard/lāževard, also written لاجورد lājevard, is commonly interpreted as having an origin in a local place name.

From the Persian, the Arabic لازورد lāzaward is the etymological source of both the English word azure (via Old French azur) and Medieval Latin lazulum, which came to mean 'heaven' or 'sky'. To disambiguate, lapis lazulī ("stone of lazulum") was used to refer to the stone itself, and is the term ultimately imported into Middle English. Lazulum is used as a root for the word for blue in several languages, including Spanish and Portuguese azul.

Mines in northeast Afghanistan continue to be a major source of lapis lazuli. Important amounts are also produced from mines west of Lake Baikal in Russia, and in the Andes mountains in Chile which is the source that the Inca used to carve artifacts and jewelry. Smaller quantities are mined in Pakistan, Italy, Mongolia, the United States, and Canada.

== Science and uses ==
=== Composition ===
The most important mineral component of lapis lazuli is lazurite (typically 30% to 40%), a blue feldspathoid silicate mineral of the sodalite family, with the formula Na_{7}Ca(Al_{6}Si_{6}O_{24})(SO_{4})(S_{3}) ·H_{2}O . Most lapis lazuli also contains calcite (white), and pyrite (metallic yellow). Some samples of lapis lazuli contain augite, diopside, enstatite, mica, hauynite, hornblende, nosean, and sulfur-rich löllingite geyerite.

Lapis lazuli usually occurs in crystalline marble as a result of contact metamorphism in marble skarns. It can also form via the hydrothermal alteration of limestone or dolomite marble where fluids inject sulfur and sodium into the host rock, substituting bands of marble with a lazurite rich silicate assembly.

=== Color ===
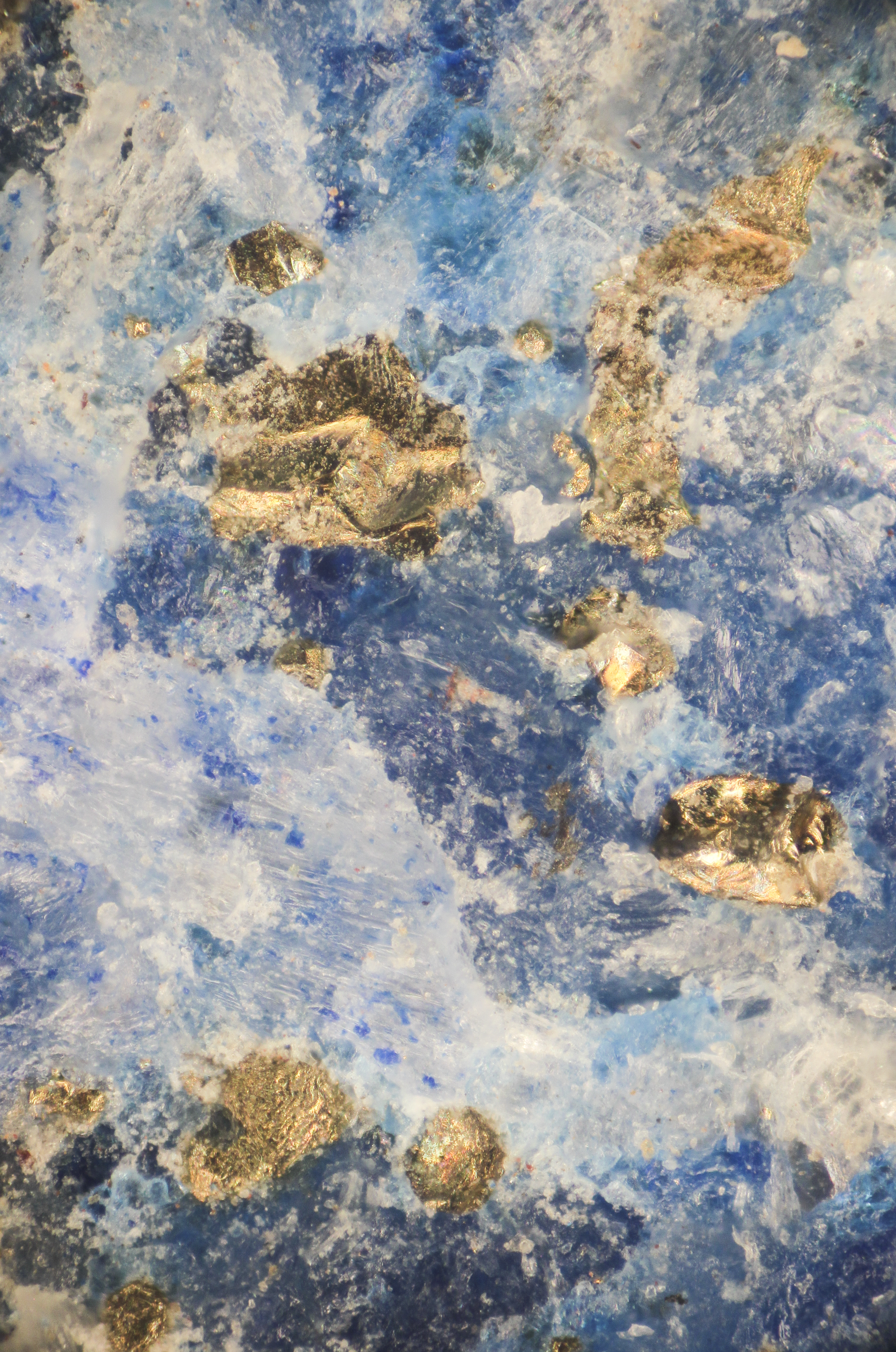
Lapis lazuli seen through a microscope (240× magnification)

The intense blue color is due to the presence of the trisulfur radical anion (S^{•−}_{3}) in the crystal. The presence of disulfur (S^{•−}_{2}) and tetrasulfur (S^{•−}_{4}) radicals can shift the color towards yellow or red, respectively. These radical anions substitute for the chloride anions within the sodalite structure. The S^{•−}_{3} radical anion exhibits a visible absorption band in the range 595–620 nm with high molar absorptivity, leading to its bright blue color.

=== Sources ===
Lapis lazuli is found in limestone in the Kokcha River valley of Badakhshan Province in north-eastern Afghanistan, where the Sar-i Sang mine deposits have been worked for more than 6,000 years. Afghanistan was the source of lapis for the ancient Persian, Egyptian and Mesopotamian civilizations, as well as the later Greeks and Romans. Ancient Egyptians obtained the material through trade with Mesopotamians, as part of Egypt–Mesopotamia relations and from ancient Ethiopia. During the height of the Indus Valley Civilisation, approximately 2000 BC, the Harappan colony, now known as Shortugai, was established near the lapis mines.

In addition to the Afghan deposits, lapis is also extracted in the Andes (near Ovalle, Chile); and to the west of Lake Baikal in Siberia, Russia, at the Tultui lazurite deposit. It is mined in smaller amounts in Angola, Argentina, Burma, Ethiopia, Pakistan, Canada, Italy, India, and in the United States in California and Colorado.

=== Uses and substitutes ===
Lapis takes an excellent polish and can be made into jewellery, carvings, boxes, mosaics, ornaments, small statues, and vases. Interior items and finishing of buildings can be also made with lapis. During the Renaissance, lapis was ground and processed to make the pigment ultramarine for use in frescoes and oil painting. Its usage as a pigment in oil paint largely ended during the early 19th century, when a chemically identical synthetic variety became available.

Lapis lazuli is commercially synthesized or simulated by the Gillson process, which is used to make artificial ultramarine and hydrous zinc phosphates. Spinel or sodalite, or dyed jasper or howlite, can be substituted for lapis.

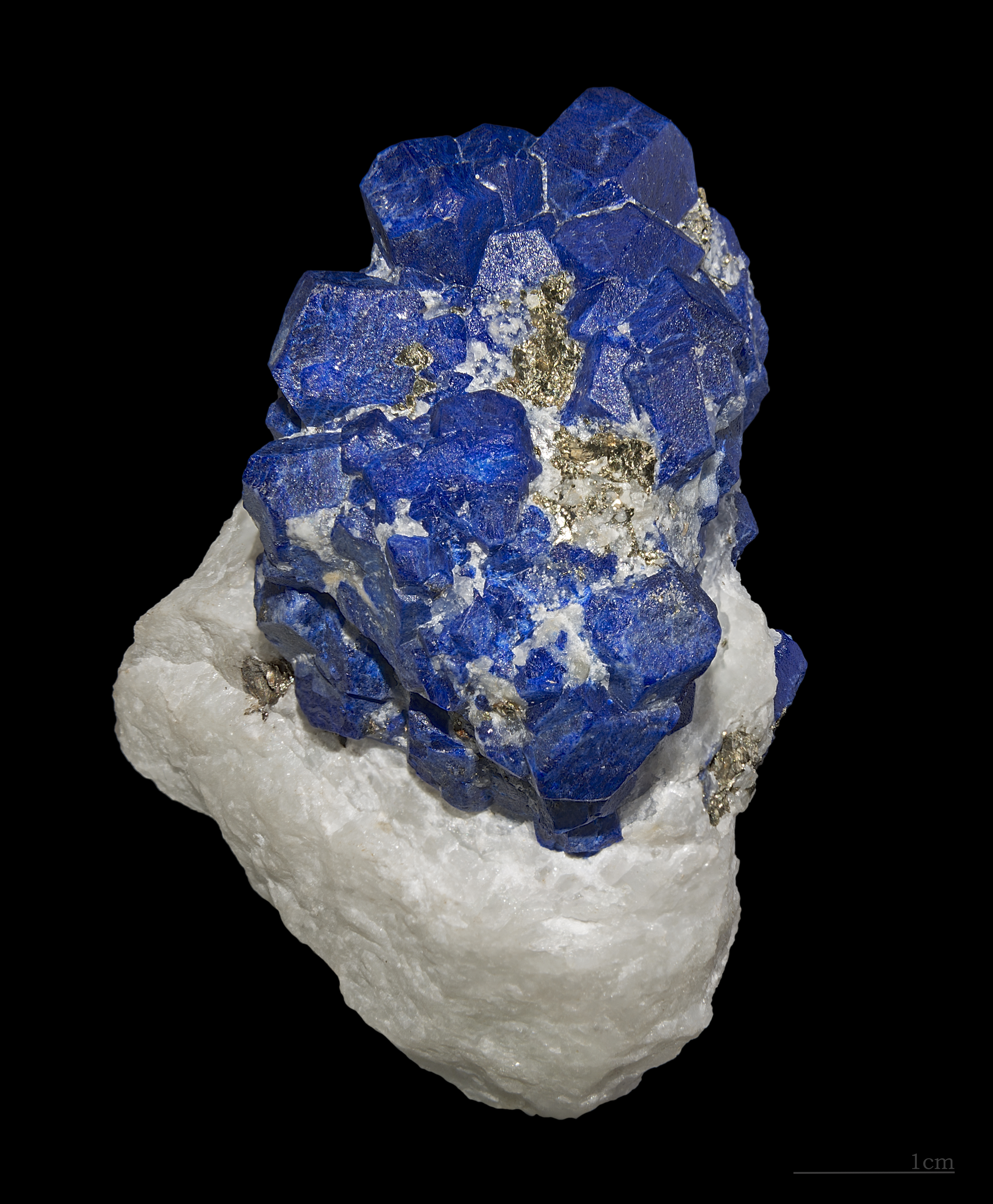
Crystals of lazurite (the main mineral in lapis lazuli) from the Sar-i Sang Mining District in Afghanistan

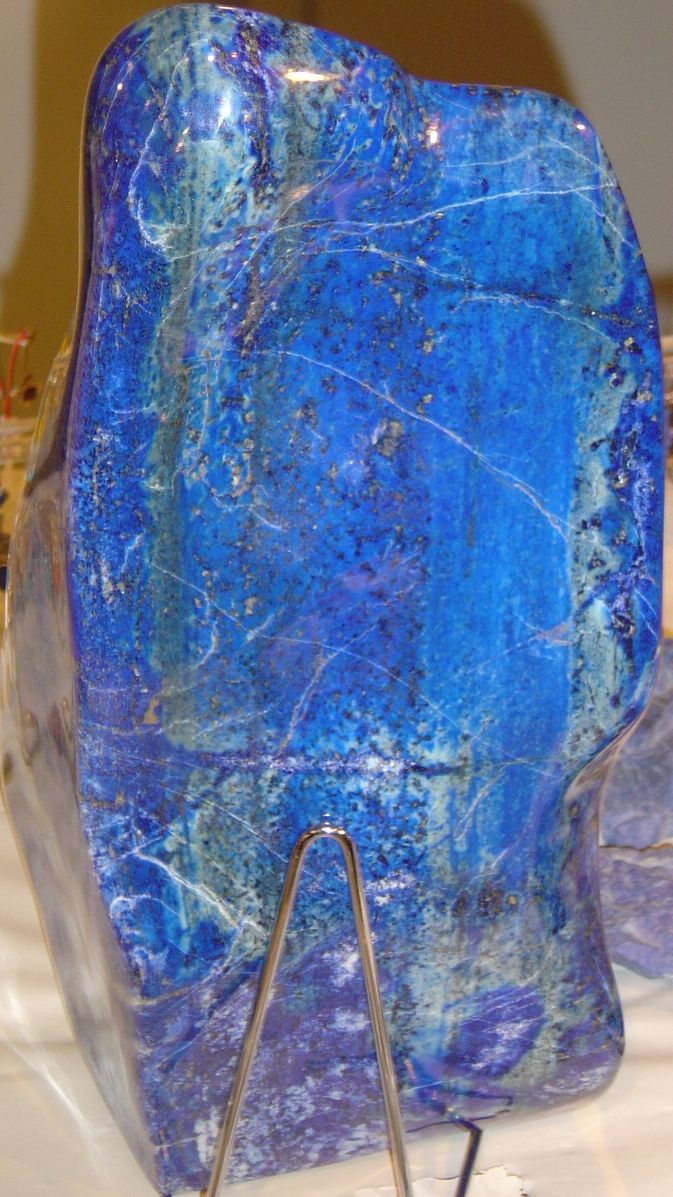
A polished block of lapis lazuli

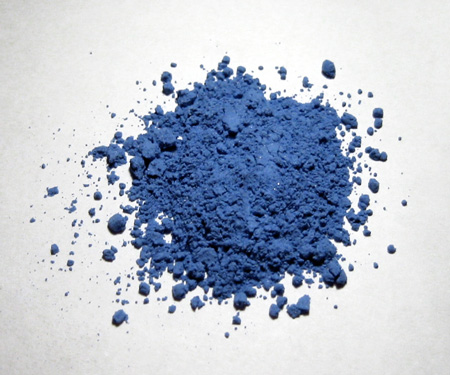
Natural ultramarine pigment made from ground lapis lazuli. During the Middle Ages and Renaissance it was the most expensive pigment available (gold being second) and was often reserved for depicting the robes of angels or the Virgin Mary.

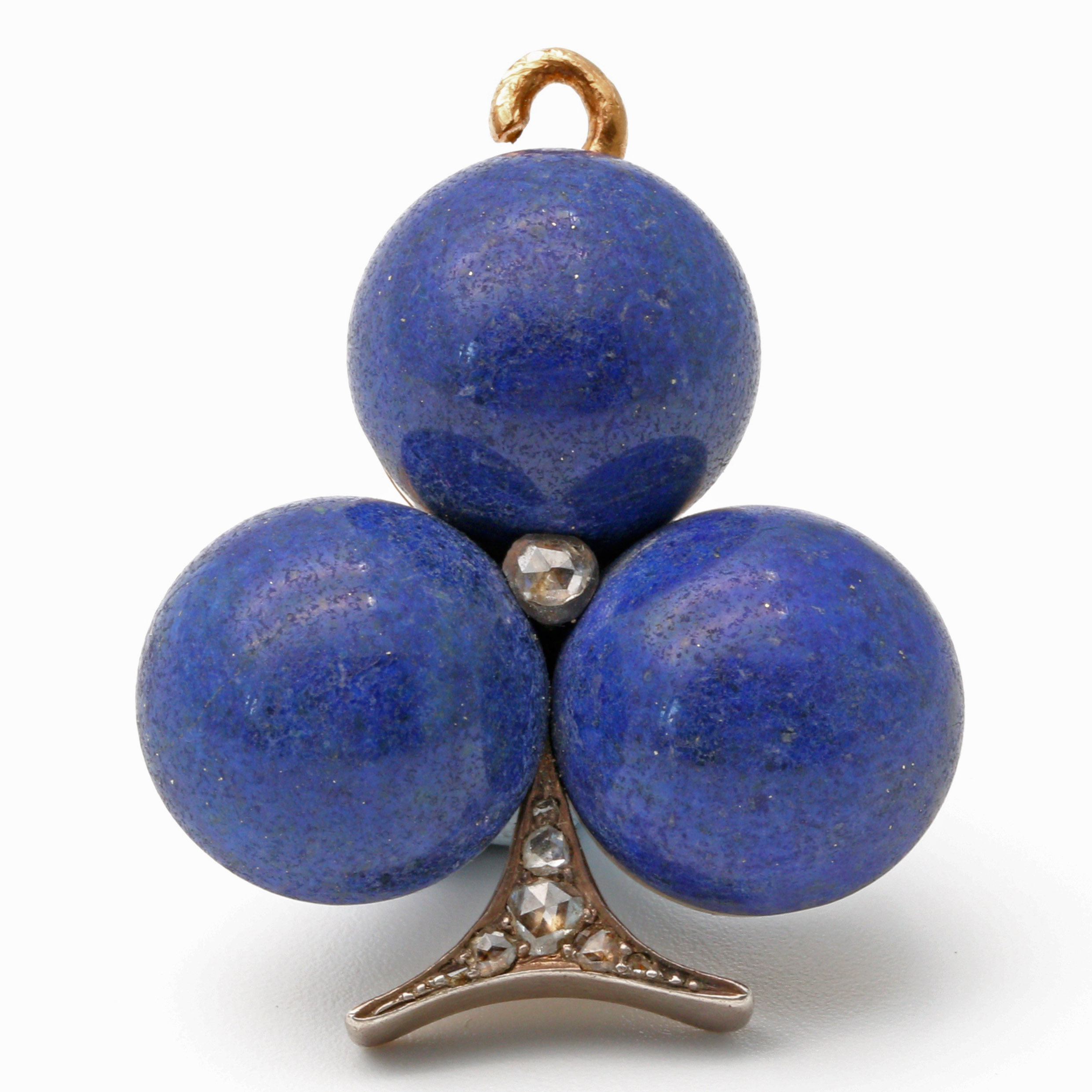
19th-century lapis lazuli and diamond pendant

== History and art ==
=== In the ancient world ===
Lapis lazuli has been mined in Afghanistan and exported to the Mediterranean world and South Asia since the Neolithic age, along the ancient trade route between Afghanistan and the Indus Valley dating to the 7th millennium BC. Quantities of these beads have also been found at 4th millennium BC settlements in Northern Mesopotamia, and at the Bronze Age site of Shahr-e Sukhteh in southeast Iran (3rd millennium BC). A dagger with a lapis handle, a bowl inlaid with lapis, amulets, beads, and inlays representing eyebrows and beards, were found in the Royal Tombs of the Sumerian city-state of Ur from the 3rd millennium BC.

Lapis was also used in ancient Persia, Mesopotamia by the Akkadians, Assyrians, and Babylonians for seals and jewelry. It is mentioned several times in the Mesopotamian poem, the Epic of Gilgamesh (17th–18th century BC), one of the oldest known works of literature. The Statue of Ebih-Il, a 3rd millennium BC statue found in the ancient city-state of Mari in modern-day Syria, now in the Louvre, uses lapis lazuli inlays for the irises of the eyes.

In ancient Egypt, lapis lazuli was a favorite stone for amulets and ornaments such as scarabs. Lapis jewellery has been found at excavations of the Predynastic Egyptian site Naqada (3300–3100 BC). At Karnak, the relief carvings of Thutmose III (1479–1429 BC) show fragments and barrel-shaped pieces of lapis lazuli being delivered to him as tribute. Powdered lapis was used as eyeshadow by Cleopatra.

Jewelry made of lapis lazuli has also been found at Mycenae attesting to relations between the Myceneans and the developed civilizations of Egypt and the East.

Pliny the Elder wrote that lapis lazuli is "opaque and sprinkled with specks of gold". Because the stone combines the blue of the heavens and golden glitter of the sun, it was emblematic of success in the old Jewish tradition. In the early Christian tradition lapis lazuli was regarded as the stone of the Virgin Mary.

In late classical times and as late as the Middle Ages, lapis lazuli was often called sapphire (Latin: sapphirus, Hebrew: סַפִּיר, romanized: sappir), though it had little to do with the stone today known as the blue corundum variety sapphire. In his book on stones, the Greek scientist Theophrastus described "the sapphirus, which is speckled with gold", a description which matches lapis lazuli.

Girl with a Pearl Earring by Vermeer

There are many references to "sapphire" in the Old Testament, but most scholars agree that, since sapphire was not known before the Roman Empire, they most likely are references to lapis lazuli. For instance, Exodus 24:10: "And they saw the God of Israel, and there was under his feet as it were a paved work of a sapphire stone ..." (KJV). The words used in the Latin Vulgate Bible in this citation are "quasi opus lapidis sapphirini", the terms for lapis lazuli. Modern translations of the Bible, such as the New Living Translation Second Edition, refer to lapis lazuli in most instances instead of sapphire.

=== Vermeer ===
Johannes Vermeer used lapis lazuli paint in the Girl with a Pearl Earring painting.

=== Yeats ===
The poet, William Butler Yeats, describes a figurine of sculpted lapis lazuli in a poem entitled "Lapis Lazuli". The sculpture of three men from China, a bird, and a musical instrument serves in the poem as a reminder of "gaiety" in the face of tragedy.

=== Twenty-first century ===
==== Usage by the Taliban ====
In 2014, a militia under Haji Abdul Malek, a former commander during the Afghan Civil War, gained control of the Kuran wa Munjan district, where major lapis mines were located. Under control of Malek, armed groups received about $20 million from the mines in 2014, an estimated $1 million of those profits going to the Taliban. The former Afghan government itself only declared about $20 million received across the whole of the country's lapis mines in 2013. The Taliban were reported to have taken around $4 million in profits from the mines in 2014. The working conditions in the mines are highly unethical.

==== Internet culture ====
Lapis lazuli appears as an in-game material in the video game Minecraft. In August 2026, lapis gave rise to the internet meme and slang term "La Peace" due to a mispronunciation of the rock's name. This occurred during a streamed Minecraft session where streamer IShowSpeed exclaimed that he thought he had discovered diamonds, while fellow streamer Kai Cenat corrected him by saying "That's lapis", pronouncing the word as if it rhymed with cerise.

== Gallery ==
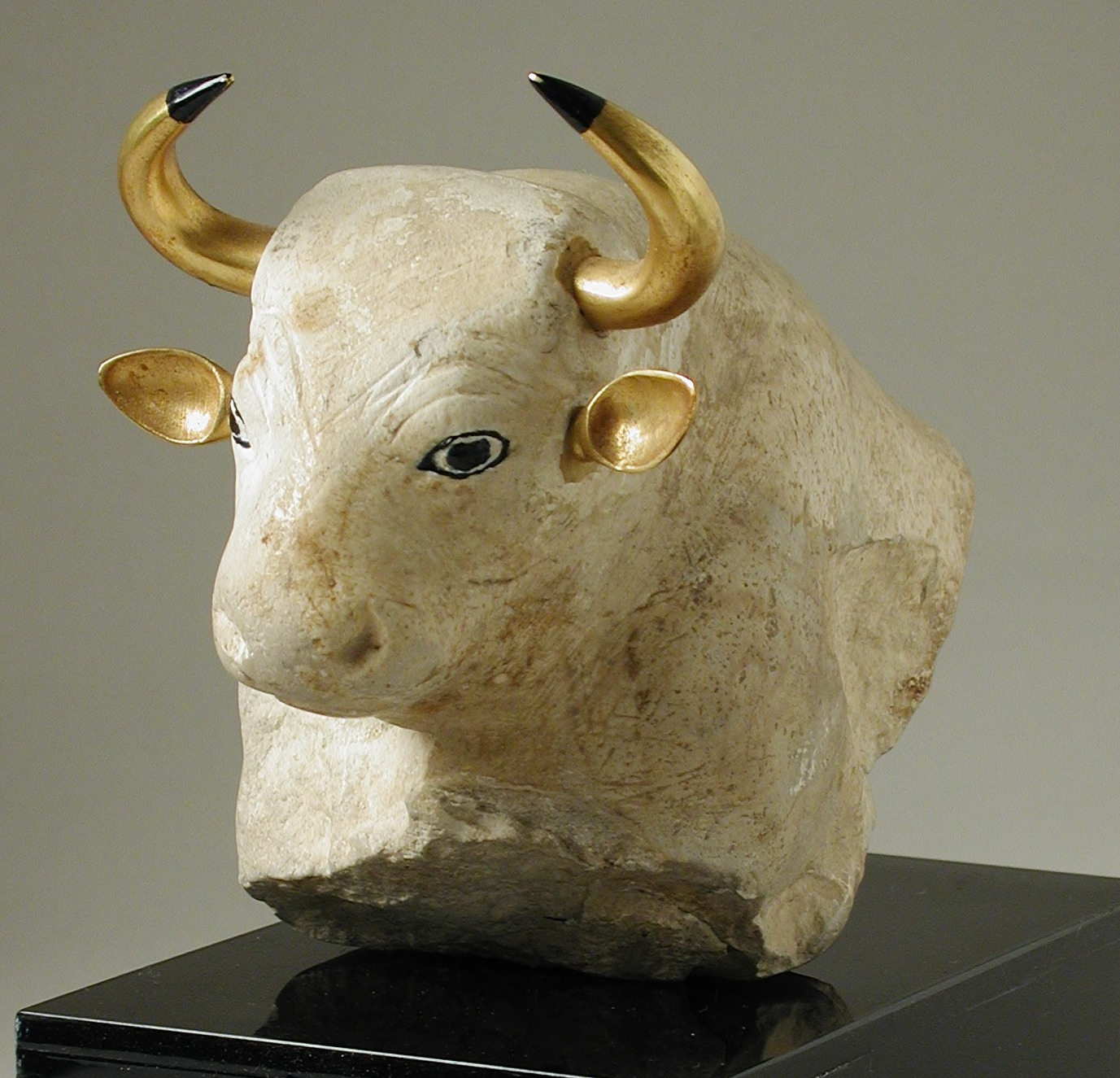
A bull with eyes decorated with lapis lazuli. Fertile Crescent, Sumerian, 889–853 B.C.

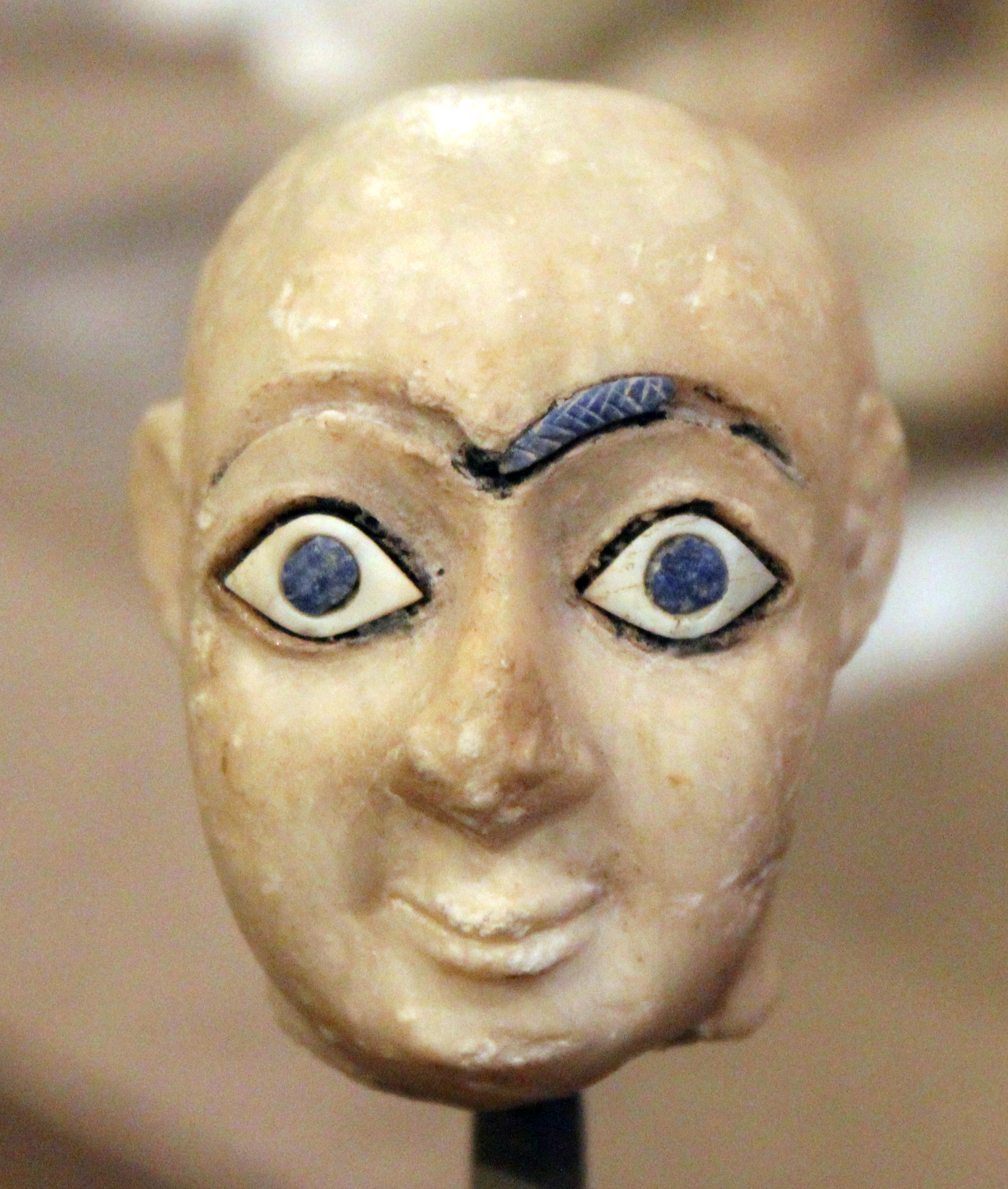
Sumerian bald clean-shaven male worshipper head, 2600–2500 BC; gypsum, shell, lapis lazuli and bitumen; from Nippur (Iraq); Museum of the Institute for the Study of Ancient Cultures (Chicago)

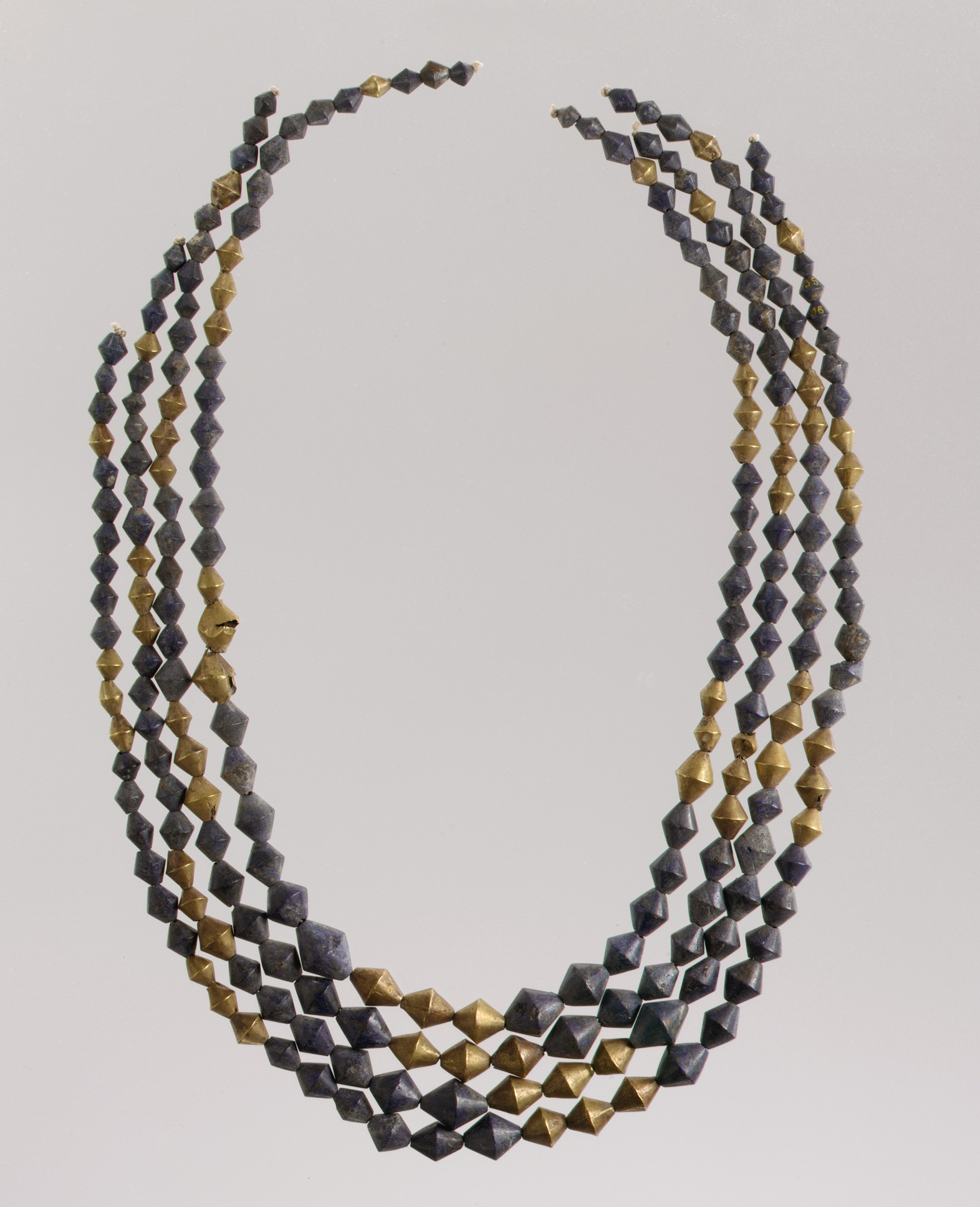
Sumerian necklace beads; 2600–2500 BC; gold and lapis lazuli; length: 54 cm (21 in); Metropolitan Museum of Art (New York City)

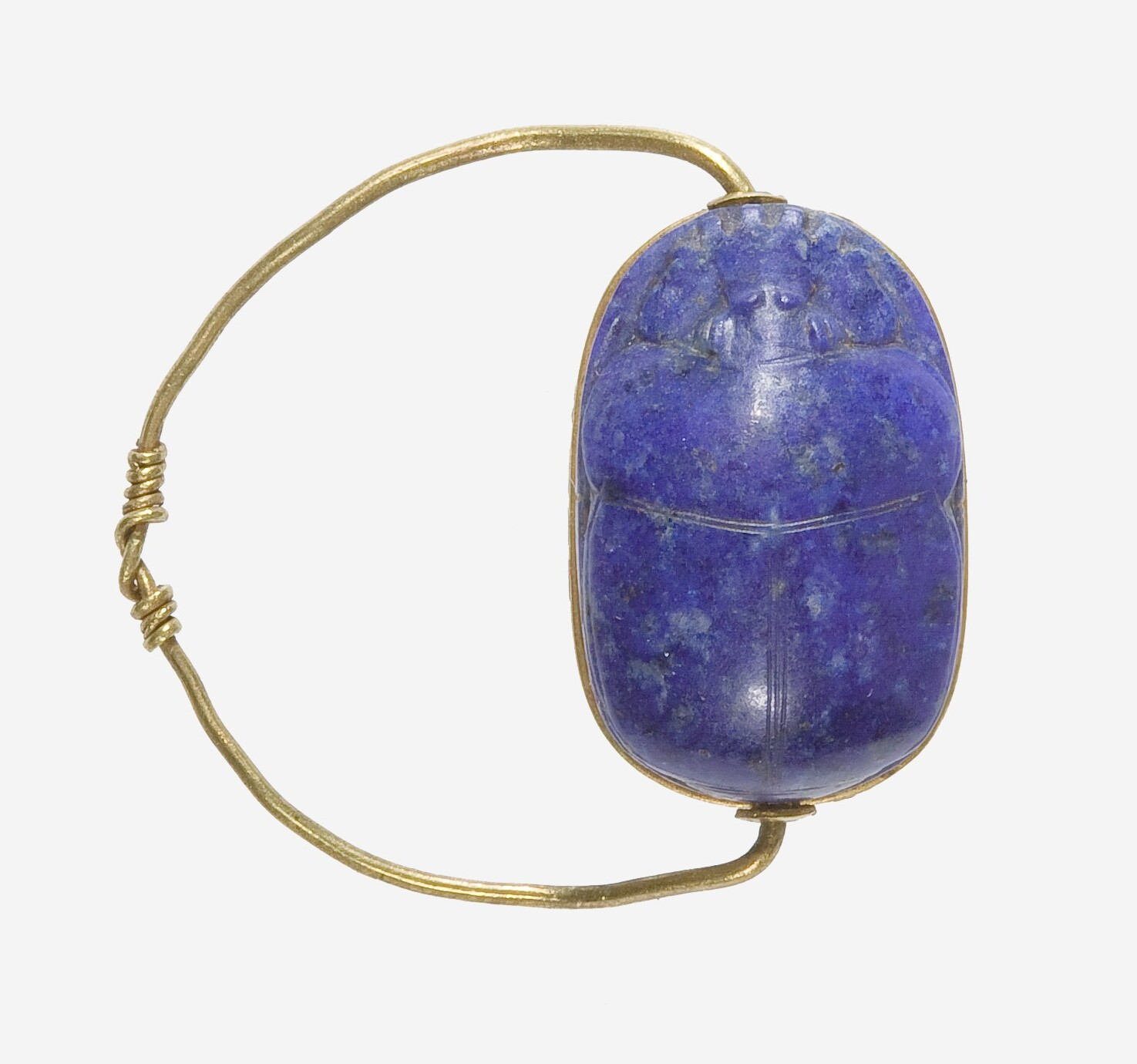
Ancient Egyptian scarab finger ring; 1850–1750 BC; lapis lazuli scarab set in gold plate and on a gold wire ring lapis-lazuli; diameter: 2.5 cm (0.98 in), the scarab: 1.8 cm (0.71 in); Metropolitan Museum of File:Lapis lazuli oval set in silver ring.jpgArt

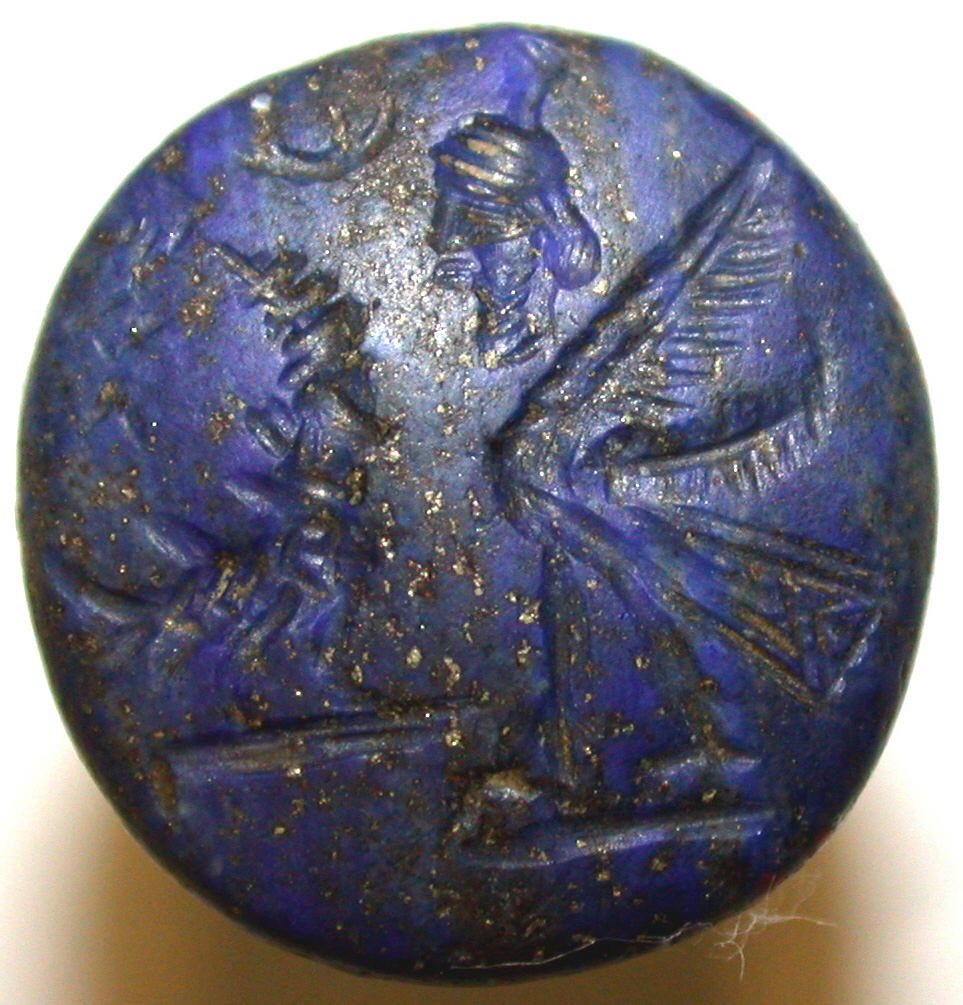
Neo-Babylonian conical seal; 7th–6th century BC; lapis lazuli; height: 2.7 cm (1.1 in), diameter: 2.1 cm (0.83 in); Metropolitan Museum of Art

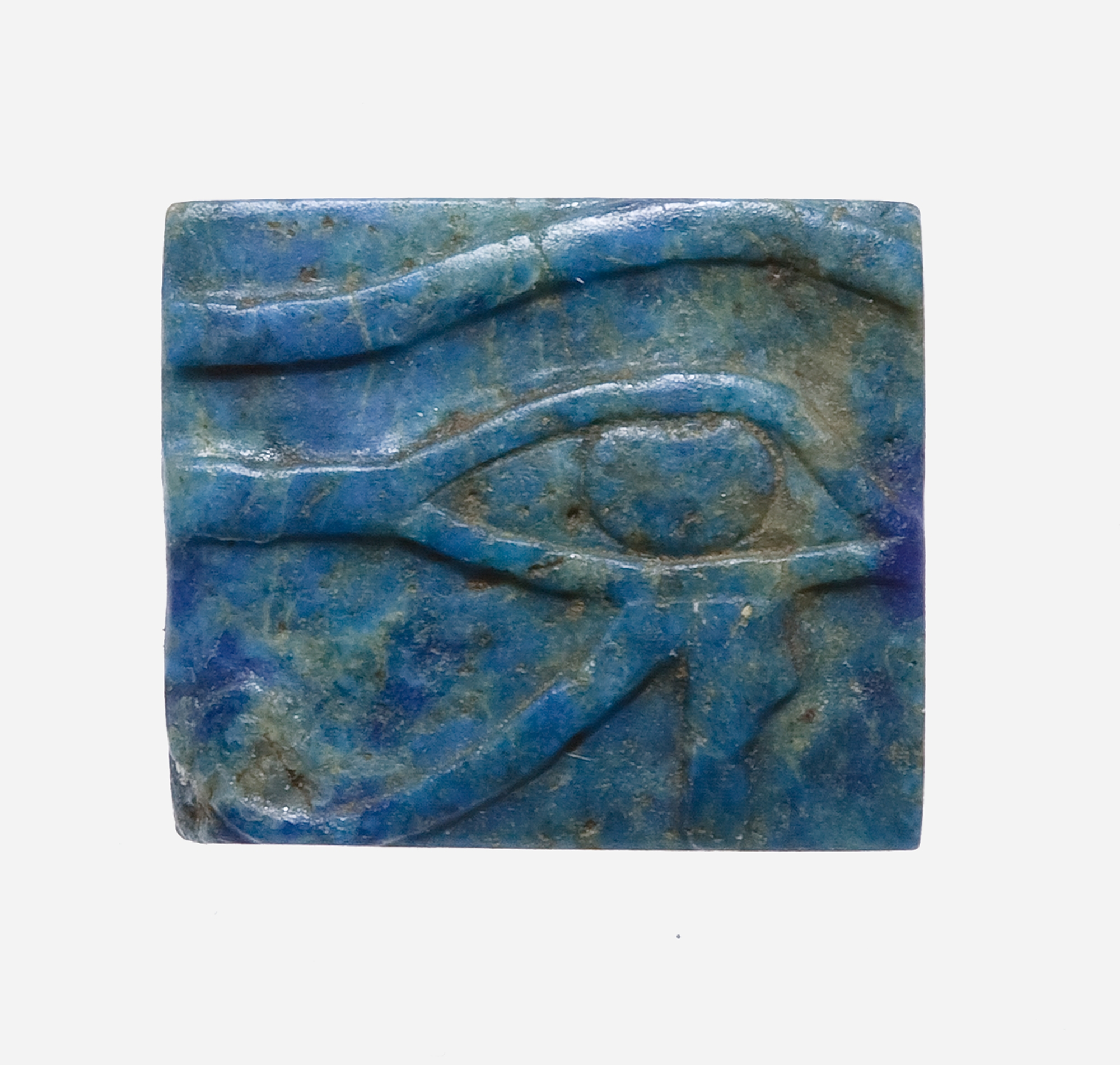
Ancient Egyptian plaque with an Eye of Horus; 664–332 BC; lapis lazuli; length: 1.8 cm (0.71 in), width: 1.6 cm (0.63 in); Metropolitan Museum of Art

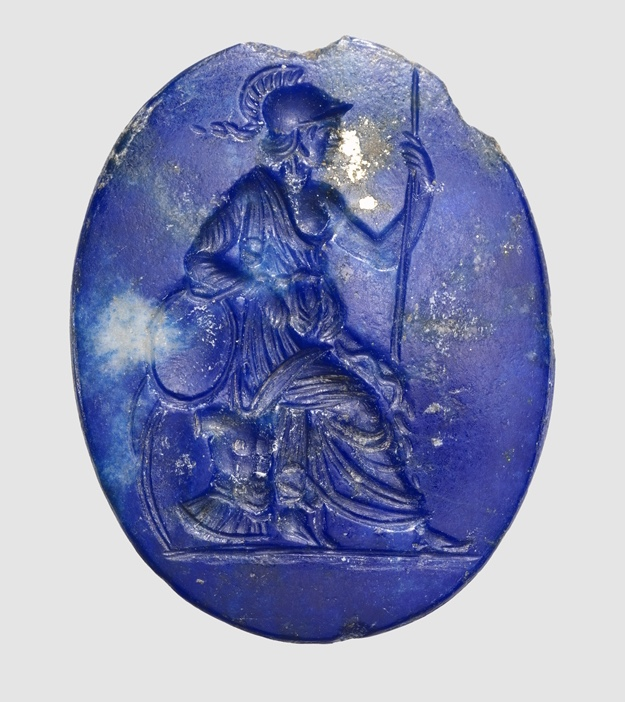
Greek or Roman ring stone; lapis lazuli; 2.1 cm × 1.6 cm × 0.3 cm (0.83 in × 0.63 in × 0.12 in); Metropolitan Museum of Art

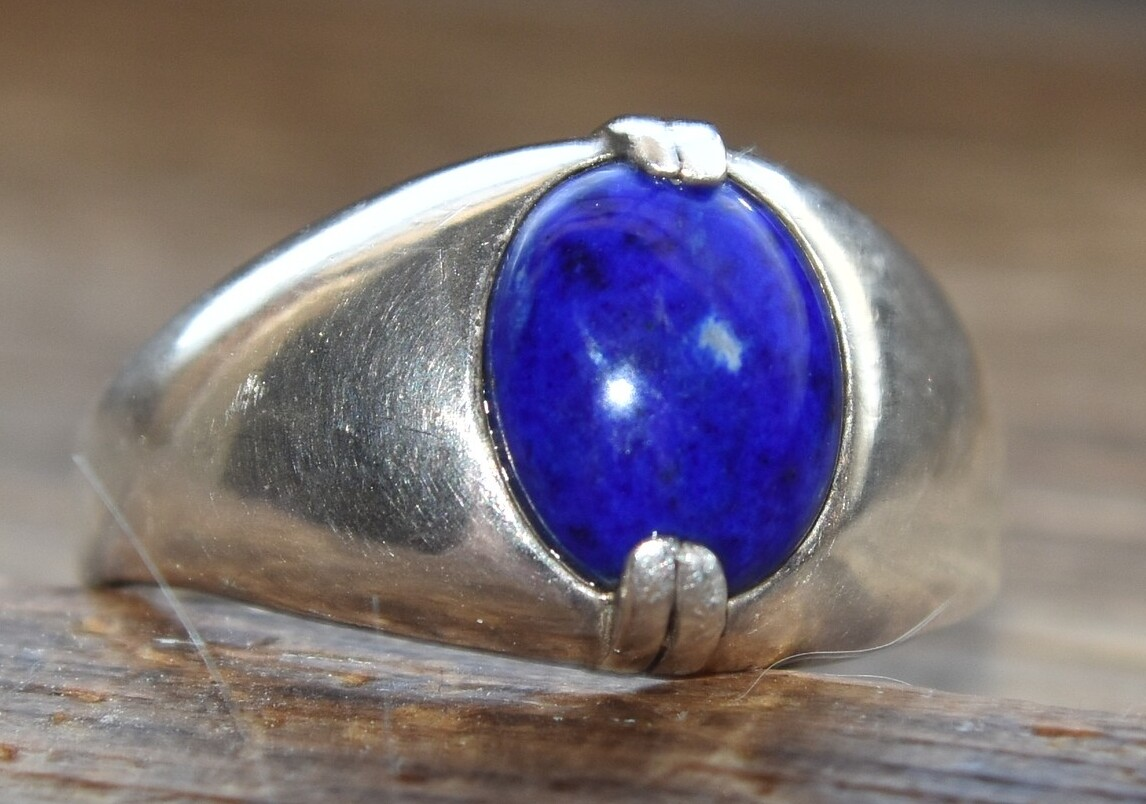
20th century silver ring with polished lapis oval; 2 cm × 2.4 cm × 1 cm (0.79 in × 0.94 in × 0.39 in)

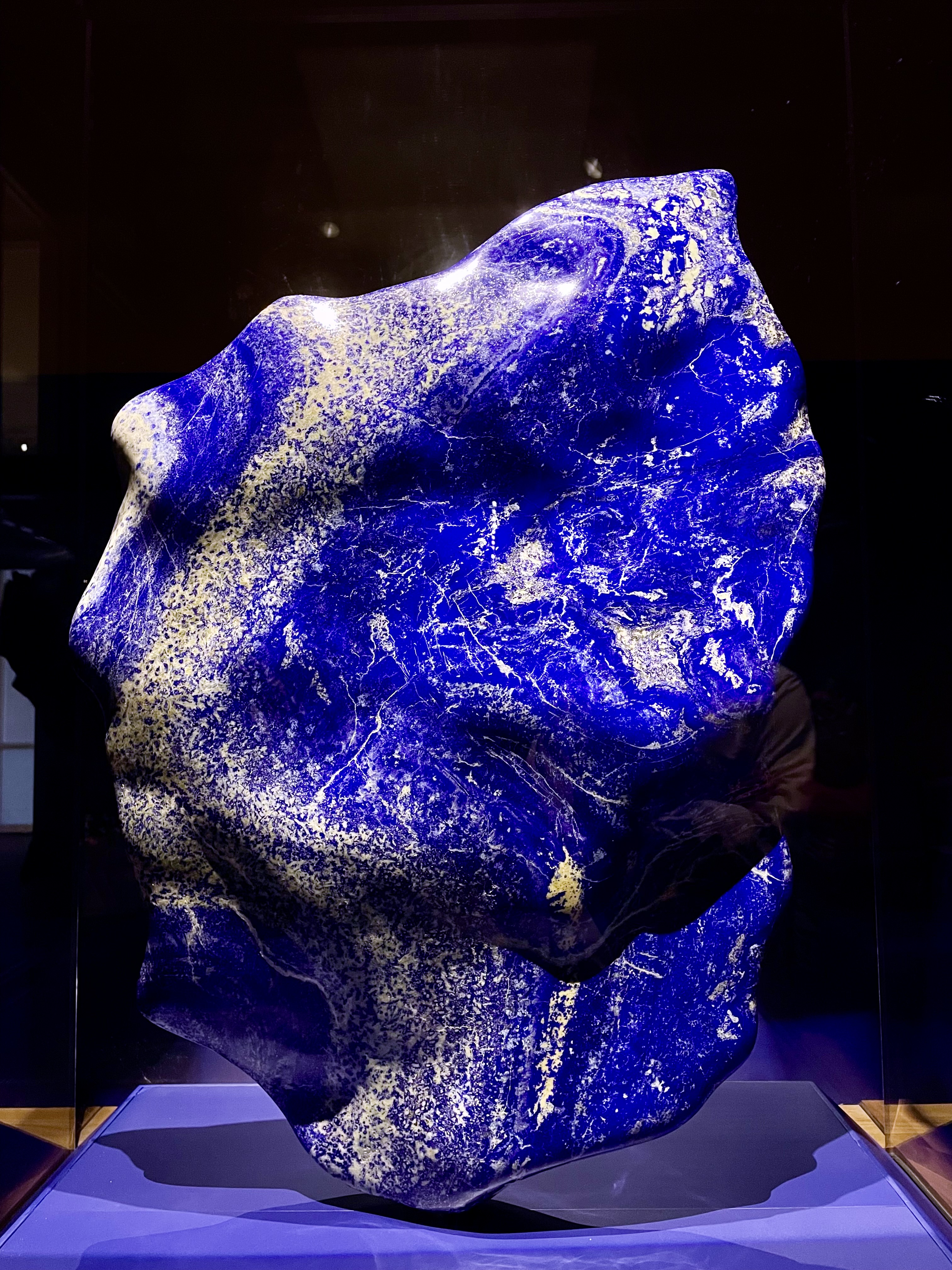
Large lapis lazuli specimen from Afghanistan's Hindu Kush mountains. National Museum of Natural History (Washington, D.C.)

== See also ==
- Dvārakā–Kamboja route – Silk Road trade route branch
- Hauyne – Rare feldspathoid mineral in the sodalite group
- Lapis armenus – Precious stone resembling lapis lazuli
- Sar-i Sang
- Shades of blue – Variety of the color blue
- Ultramarine – Deep blue pigment
