= Sodalite group =

Mineral group

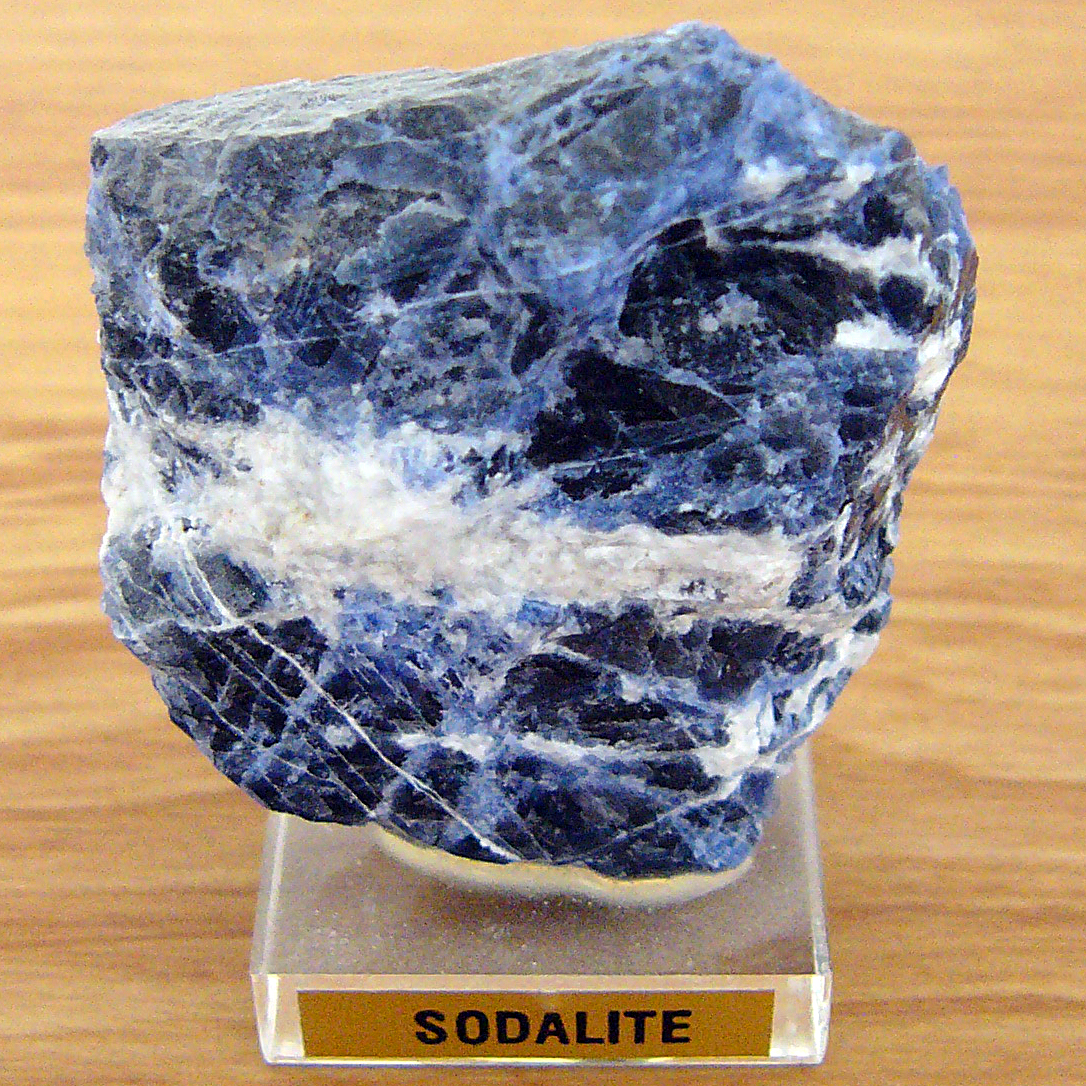

General
- Category: Tectosilicate minerals
- Group: Feldspathoid group
- IMA status: Mineral group

Identification

The sodalite group is a mineral group of feldspathoid minerals with a zeolitic crystal structure similar to that of the eponymous sodalite. In zeolite chemistry, the sodalite structure is abbreviated as SOD.

== Structure ==
The primary structure of sodalite-group minerals is a framework of truncated octahedral aluminosilicate "cages" surrounding smaller extra-framework anions and cations that serve to balance the charge. Specific ions are characteristic of specific members of the group, with partial substitution giving rise to varieties such as hackmanite.

== Members ==
The sodalite group includes the following minerals:

- Haüyne — Na_{3}Ca(Si_{3}Al_{3})O_{12}(SO_{4})
- Sodalite — Na_{4}(Al_{3}Si_{3})O_{12}Cl
- Nosean — Na_{8}(Al_{6}Si_{6})O_{24}(SO_{4})·H_{2}O
- Lazurite — Na_{3}Ca(Si_{3}Al_{3})O_{12}S
- Tsaregorodtsevite — N(CH_{3})_{4}Si_{4}(SiAl)O_{12}
- Tugtupite — Na_{4}BeAlSi_{4}O_{12}Cl
- Vladimirivanovite — Na Na_{6}Ca_{2}[Al_{6}Si_{6}O_{24}](SO_{4},S_{3},S_{2},Cl)_{2}·H_{2}O

The characteristic blue color of sodalite-group minerals arises mainly from caged S^{−}_{3} and S_{4} clusters.
