= Makhfi Badakhshi =

- مخفی بدخشی
- Born: 1876; Balkh Province, Afghanistan
- Died: 1963 (aged 86–87); Fayzabad, Badakhshan, Afghanistan
- Occupation: Poet

Sayyida Makhfi-Badakhshi (Dari: سیده مخفی بدخشی; 1876–1963); was a poet from Afghanistan. Her first publication was in 1992 by a monthly magazine. In the 1990s, her first collection of poetry was published in Faizabad, Afghanistan. Only a few of her works have been translated into English. Sayyida was famous for her ghazals.

== Life ==
Sayyida Makhfi-Badakhshi was educated privately until she moved from Kholm to Badakhshan. She had two brothers, Mir Muhammad Ghamgin and Mir Suhrab Shah Sawda, who were also poets. In 1951, she made an impression on contemporary poet Khalilullah Khalili.

== Works ==
- On Sayyida (Persian)
- Publication in the monthly periodical Kābul (Kābul, Number 271, Volume 20, Issue 11, August 24, 1950).
