= Tugtupite =

Feldspathoid mineral in the sodalite group

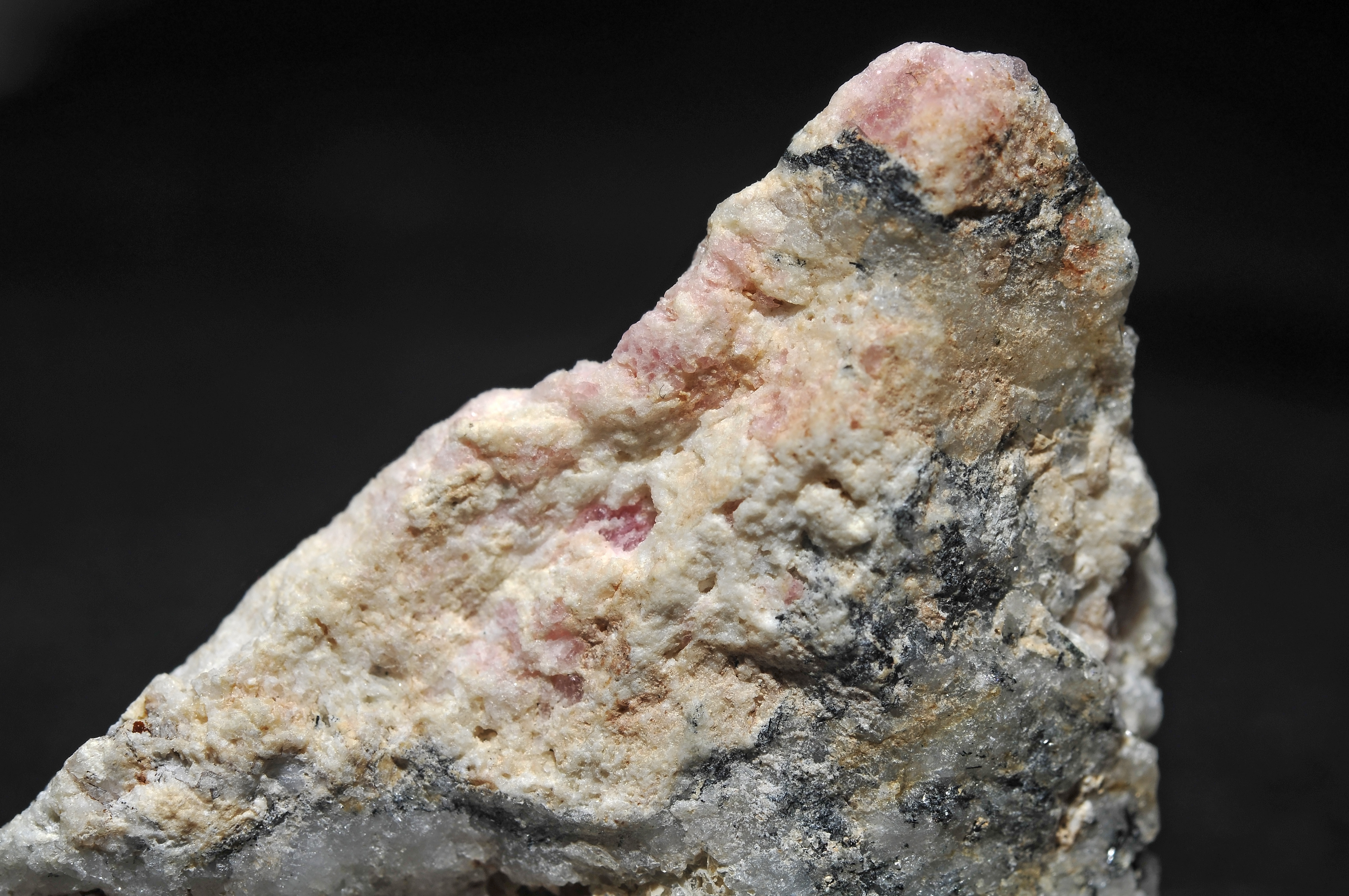

General
- Category: Tectosilicate minerals
- Group: Feldspathoid group, sodalite group
- Formula: Na_{4}(AlBeSi_{4}O_{12})Cl
- IMA symbol: Ttp
- Strunz classification: 9.FB.10
- Crystal system: Tetragonal
- Crystal class: Disphenoidal (4̅); H-M symbol: (4̅)
- Space group: I4̅

Identification
- Color: White, pink, crimson, blue, green
- Cleavage: none
- Fracture: conchoidal, uneven
- Mohs scale hardness: 4
- Luster: vitreous, greasy
- Diaphaneity: translucent to opaque
- Specific gravity: 2.36
- Optical properties: uniaxial (+)
- Refractive index: 1.496–1.502
- Birefringence: 0.006
- Pleochroism: dichroism, moderate purple–red to orange–red
- Ultraviolet fluorescence: SWUV: inert to strong red to orange red; LWUV: inert or red to orange red

Tugtupite is a beryllium aluminium tectosilicate. It also contains sodium and chlorine and has the formula Na_{4}AlBeSi_{4}O_{12}Cl. Tugtupite is a member of the silica-deficient feldspathoid mineral group. It occurs in high alkali intrusive igneous rocks.

Tugtupite is tenebrescent, sharing much of its crystal structure with sodalite, and the two minerals are occasionally found together in the same sample.

Tugtupite occurs as vitreous, transparent to translucent masses of tetragonal crystals and is commonly found in white, pink, to crimson, and even blue and green. It has a Mohs hardness of 4 and a specific gravity of 2.36. It fluoresces crimson under ultraviolet radiation.

It was first found in 1962 at Tugtup agtakôrfia Ilimaussaq intrusive complex of southwest Greenland. It has also been found at Mont-Saint-Hilaire in Quebec and in the Lovozero Massif of the Kola Peninsula in Russia, though only deposits in Greenland have been found to be of gem-quality thus far.

The name is derived from the Greenlandic Inuit word for reindeer (tuttu), and means "reindeer blood".

The U.S. Geological Survey reports that in Nepal, tugtupite (as well as jasper and nephrite) were found extensively in most of the rivers from the Bardia to the Dang.

It is used as a gemstone.
