= Sar-i Sang =

Sar-e Sang Sar-i Sang
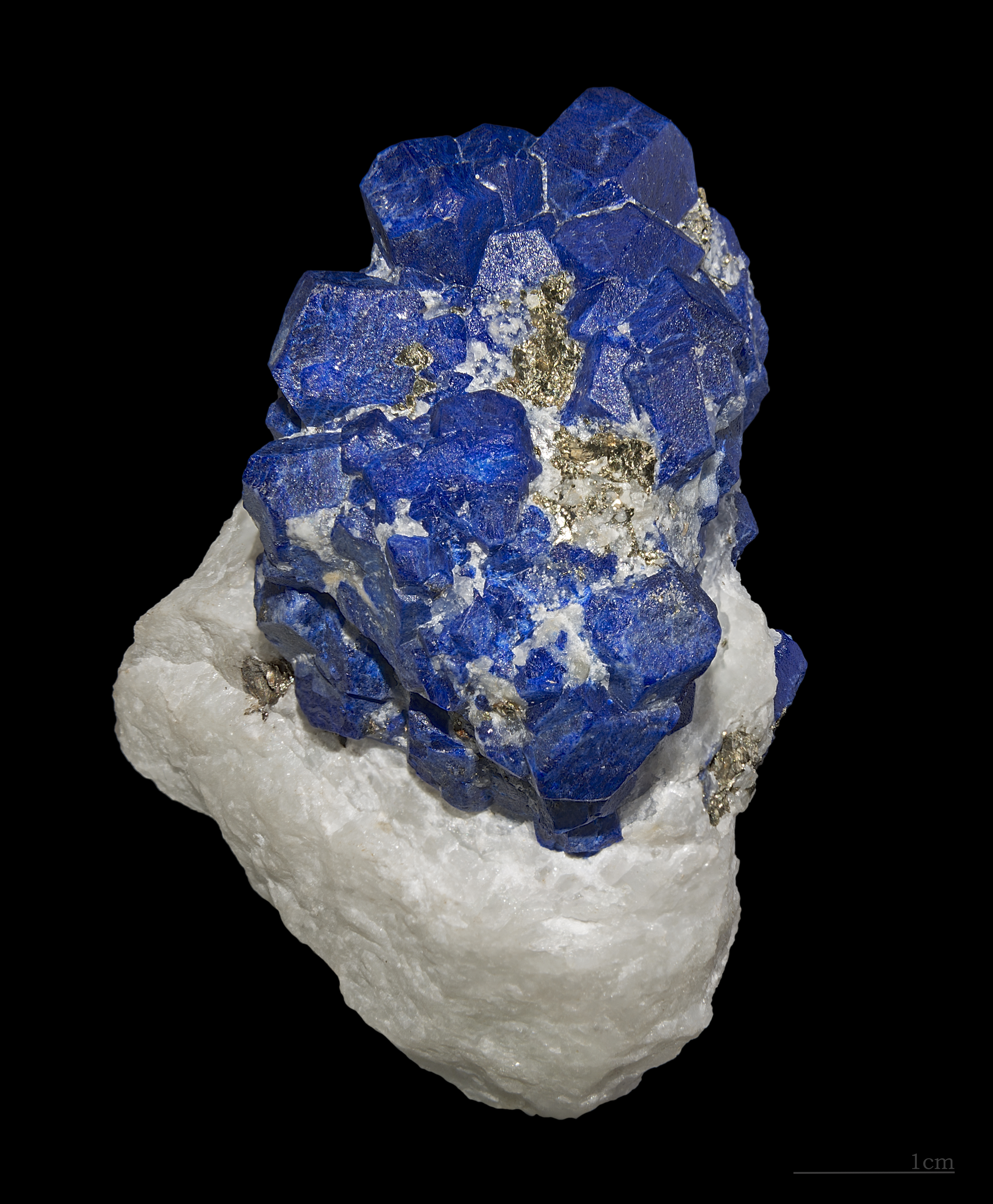
- Lazurite from Sar-e Sang

- Location in Afghanistan
- Coordinates: 36°12′36″N 70°47′36″E
- Country: Afghanistan
- Province: Badakhshan Province
- Time zone: + 4.30

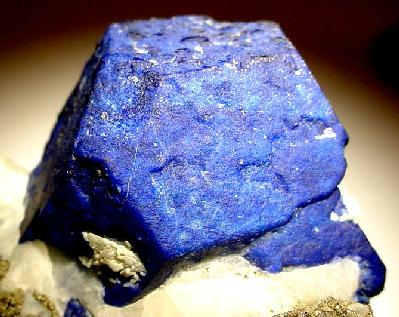
Another Sar-e Sang Lazurite crystal, with the classic deep azure-blue color. Crystal is 4.5 cm wide.

Sar-i Sang (or Sar-e Sang) (lit. "stone summit" in Persian) is a settlement in the Kuran Wa Munjan District of Badakhshan Province, Afghanistan, famous for its ancient lapis lazuli mines producing some of the world's finest lapis. It is located in the Kokcha valley.

== Lapis lazuli mines ==
The Sar-i Sang lapis lazuli mine probably dates from prehistoric times. It consists of one old disused shaft and two new shafts. This was the main source of lapis lazuli in the ancient world, with lapis from here occurring in such famous archaeological discoveries as the Royal Treasure of Ur and the Tomb of Tutankhamun.

== See also ==
- Mount Imeon
