= Hauyne =

Rare feldspathoid mineral in the sodalite group

Haüyne
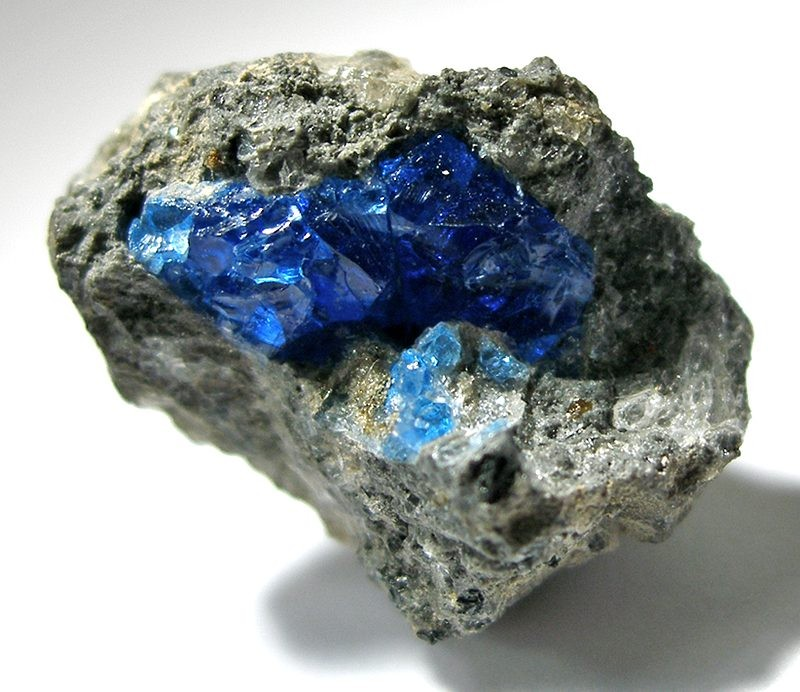
- Hauyne from Mayen, Eifel Mts, Rhineland-Palatinate, Germany

General
- Category: Tectosilicate minerals
- Group: Feldspathoid group, sodalite group
- Formula: Na_{3}Ca(Si_{3}Al_{3})O_{12}(SO_{4})
- IMA symbol: Hyn
- Strunz classification: 9.FB.10 (10 ed); 8/J.11-30 (8 ed)
- Dana classification: 76.2.3.3
- Crystal system: Isometric
- Crystal class: Hextetrahedral (4̅3m); H-M symbol (4̅ 3m)
- Space group: P4̅3n
- Unit cell: a = 9.08 – 9.13 Å; Z = 2

Identification
- Formula mass: 1,032.43 g/mol
- Color: Blue, white, gray, yellow, green, pink
- Crystal habit: Dodecahedral or pseudo-octahedral
- Twinning: Common on {111}
- Cleavage: Distinct on {110}
- Fracture: Uneven to conchoidal
- Tenacity: Brittle
- Mohs scale hardness: 5 to 6
- Luster: Vitreous to greasy
- Streak: Very pale blue to white
- Diaphaneity: Transparent to translucent
- Specific gravity: 2.4 to 2.5
- Optical properties: Isotropic
- Refractive index: n = 1.494 to 1.509
- Birefringence: None, isotropic
- Pleochroism: None, isotropic
- Fusibility: 4.5
- Solubility: Gelatinises in acids
- Other characteristics: May fluoresce orange to pink under longwave ultraviolet light

Hauyne or haüyne, also called hauynite or haüynite (/ɑːˈwiːnaɪt/ ah-WEE-nyte), old name Azure spar, is a rare tectosilicate sulfate mineral with endmember formula Na_{3}Ca(Si_{3}Al_{3})O_{12}(SO_{4}). As much as 5 wt % K_{2}O may be present, and also H_{2}O and Cl. It is a feldspathoid and a member of the sodalite group. Hauyne was first described in 1807 from samples discovered in Vesuvian lavas in Monte Somma, Italy, and was named in 1807 by Brunn-Neergard for the French crystallographer René Just Haüy (1743–1822). It is sometimes used as a gemstone.

== Related minerals ==
Haüyne forms a solid solution with nosean and with sodalite. Complete solid solution exists between synthetic nosean and haüyne at 600 °C, but only limited solid solution occurs in the sodalite-nosean and sodalite-haüyne systems.

== Unit cell ==
Haüyne belongs to the hexatetrahedral class of the isometric system, 4̅3m, space group P4̅3n. It has one formula unit per unit cell (Z = 1), which is a cube with side length of 9 Å. More accurate measurements are as follows:

- a = 8.9 Å
- a = 9.08 to 9.13 Å
- a = 9.10 to 9.13 Å
- a = 9.11(2) Å
- a = 9.116 Å
- a = 9.13 Å

== Structure ==
All silicates have a basic structural unit that is a tetrahedron with an oxygen ion O at each apex, and a silicon ion Si in the middle, forming (SiO_{4})^{4−}. In tectosilicates (framework silicates) each oxygen ion is shared between two tetrahedra, linking all the tetrahedra together to form a framework. Since each O is shared between two tetrahedra only half of it "belongs" to the Si ion in either tetrahedron, and if no other components are present then the formula is SiO_{2}, as in quartz.

Aluminium ions Al, can substitute for some of the silicon ions, forming (AlO_{4})^{5−} tetrahedra. If the substitution is random the ions are said to be disordered, but in haüyne the Al and Si in the tetrahedral framework are fully ordered.

Si has a charge 4+, but the charge on Al is only 3+. If all the cations (positive ions) are Si then the positive charges on the Si's exactly balance the negative charges on the O's. When Al replaces Si there is a deficiency of positive charge, and this is made up by extra positively charged ions (cations) entering the structure, somewhere in between the tetrahedra.

In haüyne these extra cations are sodium Na^{+} and calcium Ca^{2+}, and in addition the negatively charged sulfate group (SO_{4})^{2−} is also present. In the haüyne structure the tetrahedra are linked to form six-membered rings that are stacked up in an ..ABCABC.. sequence along one direction, and rings of four tetrahedra are stacked up parallel to another direction. The resulting arrangement forms continuous channels that can accommodate a large variety of cations and anions.

== Appearance ==
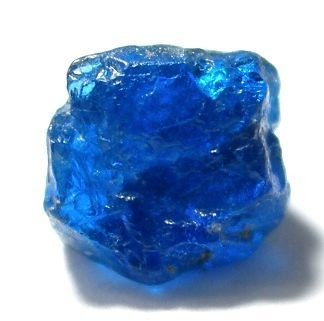
Gemmy Hauyne crystals from Mayen, Rhineland-Palatinate, Germany

Haüyne crystallizes in the isometric system forming rare dodecahedral or pseudo-octahedral crystals that may reach 3 cm across; it also occurs as rounded grains. The crystals are transparent to translucent, with a vitreous to greasy luster. The color is usually bright blue, but it can also be white, grey, yellow, green and pink. In thin section the crystals are colorless or pale blue, and the streak is very pale blue to white.

== Optical properties ==
Haüyne is isotropic. Truly isotropic minerals have no birefringence, but haüyne is weakly birefringent when it contains inclusions. The refractive index is 1.50, and although this is quite low, similar to that of ordinary window glass, it is the largest value for minerals of the sodalite group. It may show reddish orange to purplish pink fluorescence under longwave ultraviolet light.

== Physical properties ==
Cleavage is distinct to perfect, and twinning is common, as contact, penetration and polysynthetic twins. The fracture is uneven to conchoidal, the mineral is brittle, and it has hardness 5 1/2 to 6, almost as hard as feldspar. All the members of the sodalite group have quite low densities, less than that of quartz; haüyne is the densest of them all, but still its specific gravity is only 2.44 to 2.50. If haüyne is placed on a glass slide and treated with nitric acid HNO_{3}, and then the solution is allowed to evaporate slowly, monoclinic needles of gypsum form. This distinguishes haüyne from sodalite, which forms cubic crystals of chlorite under the same conditions. The mineral is not radioactive.

== Geological setting and associations ==
Haüyne occurs in phonolites and related leucite- or nepheline-rich, silica-poor, igneous rocks; less commonly in nepheline-free extrusives and metamorphic rocks (marble). Associated minerals include nepheline, leucite, titanian andradite, melilite, augite, sanidine, biotite, phlogopite and apatite.

== Localities ==
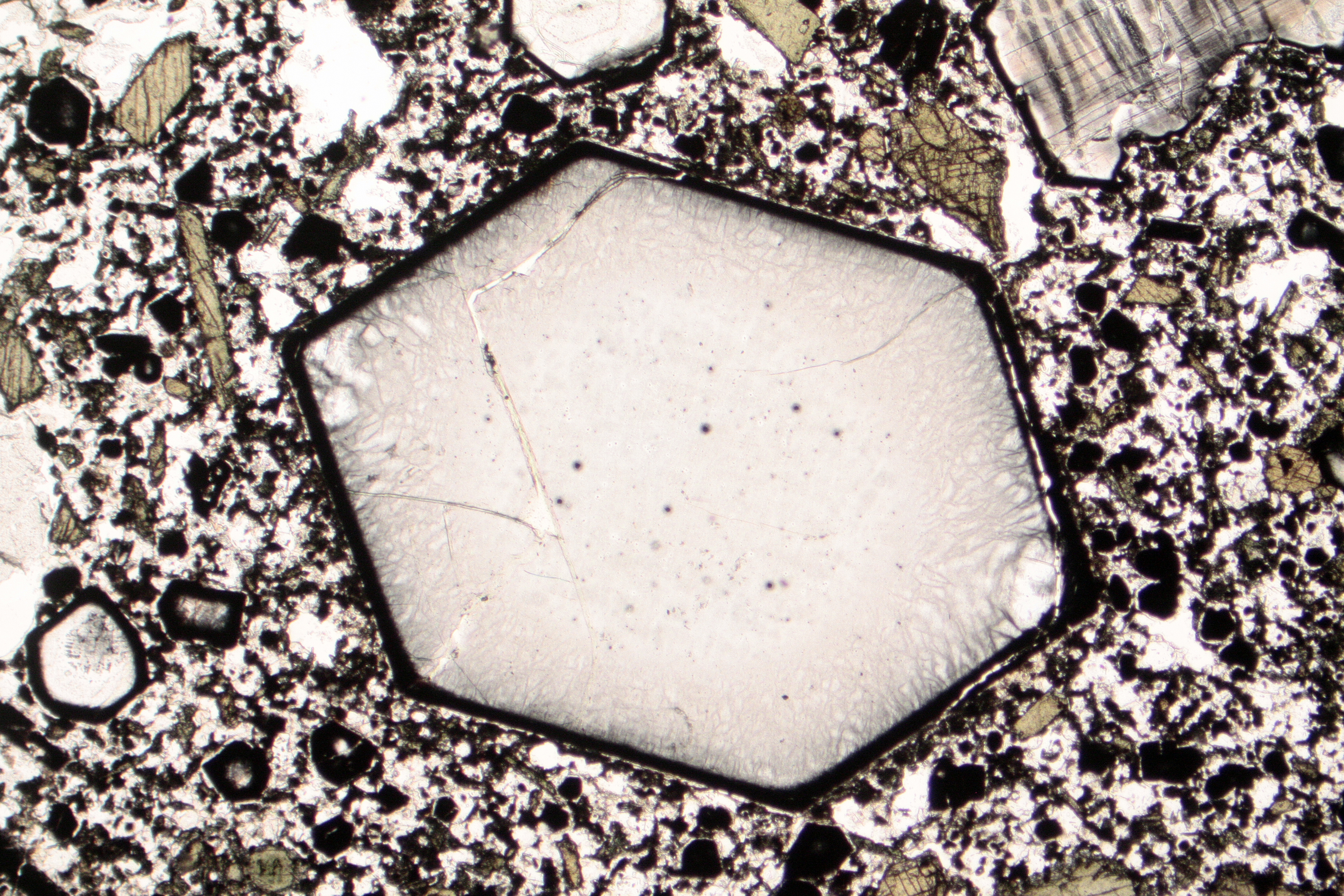
A six-sided phenocryst of haüyne (diameter about 1 mm) surrounded by a fine-grained groundmass in a foidite (volcanic rock) from Melfi (Italy), as seen in thin section under a petrographic microscope

The type locality is Lake Nemi, Alban Hills, Rome Province, Latium, Italy.

Occurrences include:

- Canary Islands: A pale blue mineral intermediate between haüyne and lazurite has been found in spinel dunite xenoliths from La Palma, Canary Islands.
- Ecuador: Phenocrysts found in alkaline extrusive rocks (tephrite), product of effusive volcanism of the Sumaco volcano, of northeast Ecuador.
- Germany: In ejected rocks of hornblende-haüyne-scapolite rock from the Laach lake volcanic complex, Eifel, Rhineland-Palatinate
- Italy: Anhedral blue to dark grey phenocrysts in leucite-melilite-bearing lava at Monte Vulture, Melfi, Basilicata, Potenza
- Italy: Millimetric transparent blue crystals in ejecta consisting mainly of K-feldspar and plagioclase from Albano Laziale, Roma
- Italy: Ejected blocks in the peperino of the Alban Hills, Rome Province, Latium, contain white octahedral haüyne associated with leucite, garnet, melilite and latiumite.
- US: Haüyne of metamorphic origin occurs at the Edwards Mine, St. Lawrence County, New York.
- US: Haüyne occurs in nepheline alnoite with melilite, phlogopite and apatite at Winnett, Petroleum County, Montana, US.
- US: Haüyne is common in small quantities as phenocrysts in phonolite and lamprophyre at the Cripple Creek, Colorado Mining District, Colorado, US.

== See also ==
- Lapis lazuli – Metamorphic rock containing lazurite, prized for its intense blue color
- Lazurite – Alumino-silicate mineral whose blue colour is due to a sulfide species and not copper
