= Lazurite =

Alumino-silicate mineral whose blue colour is due to a sulfide species and not copper

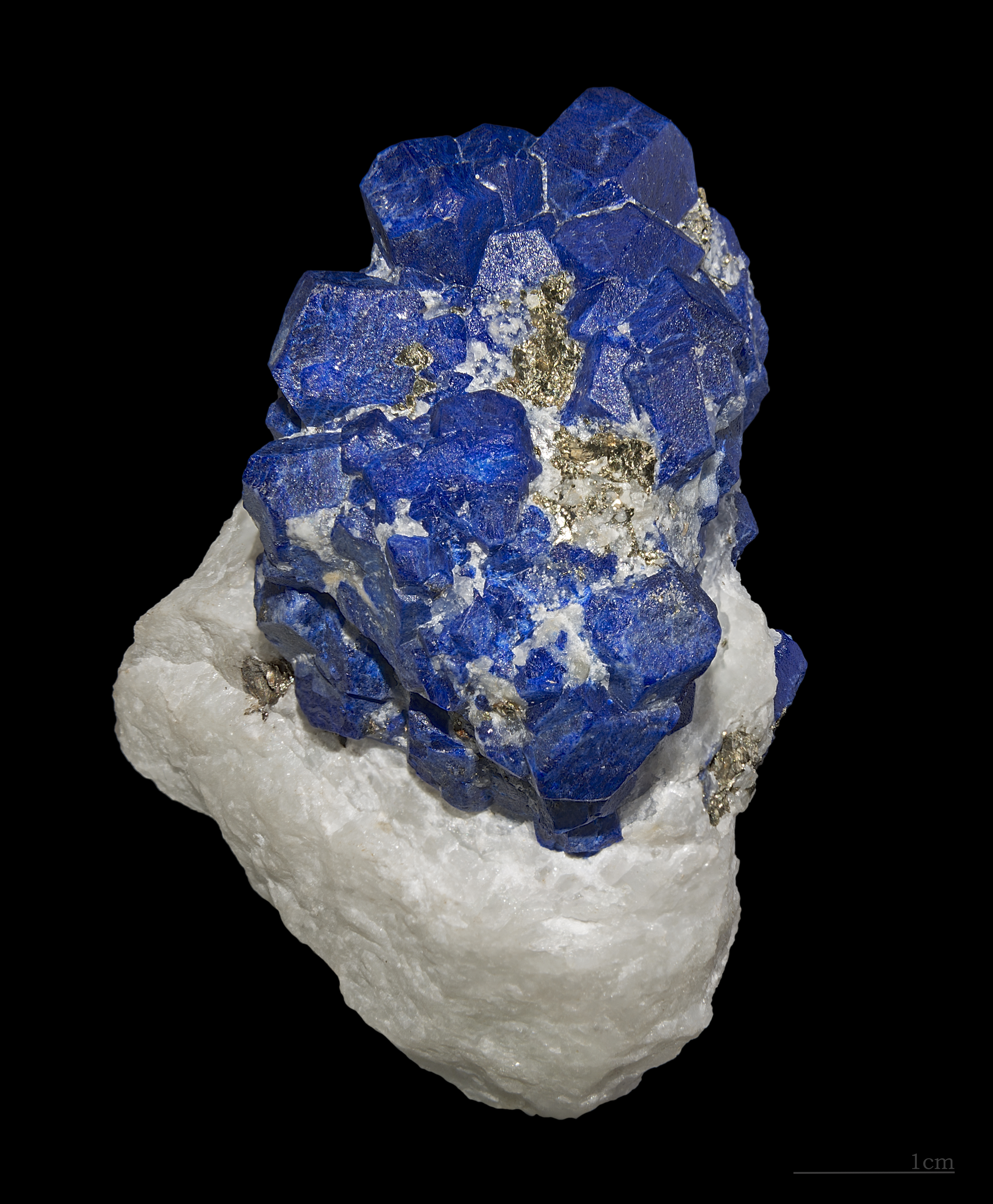
- Lazurite, Ladjuar Medam (Lajur Madan; Lapis-lazuli Mine), Sar-e-Sang District, Koksha Valley (Kokscha; Kokcha), Badakhshan (Badakshan; Badahsan) Province, Afghanistan

General
- Category: Tectosilicate minerals
- Group: Feldspathoid group, sodalite group
- Formula: (Na,Ca)_{8}[(S,Cl,SO_{4},OH)_{2}|(Al_{6}Si_{6}O_{24})]
- IMA symbol: Lzr
- Strunz classification: 9.FB.10
- Crystal system: Isometric
- Crystal class: Hextetrahedral (4̅3m); H-M symbol: (4̅ 3m)
- Space group: P4̅3n
- Unit cell: a = 9.09 Å; Z = 2

Identification
- Color: Deep blue, azure, violet-blue, greenish blue
- Crystal habit: Crystals occur as dodecahedra, or rarely cubes; granular, disseminated, or massive
- Cleavage: Imperfect on {110}
- Fracture: Uneven
- Tenacity: Brittle
- Mohs scale hardness: 5–5.5
- Luster: Vitreous
- Diaphaneity: Translucent to opaque
- Specific gravity: 2.38–2.45
- Optical properties: Isotropic; anomalously anisotropic
- Refractive index: 1.502–1.522
- Fusibility: 3.5
- Solubility: Soluble in HCl

Lazurite, old name Azure spar, is a tectosilicate mineral of sulfate, sulfur, and chloride with the formula (Na,Ca)_{8}[(S,Cl,SO_{4},OH)_{2}|(Al_{6}Si_{6}O_{24})]. It is a feldspathoid and a member of the sodalite group. Lazurite crystallizes in the isometric system although well‐formed crystals are rare. It is usually massive and forms the bulk of the gemstone lapis lazuli.

== Mineral ==
Lazurite is a deep‐blue to greenish‐blue. The colour is due to the presence of S^{−}_{3} anions. It has a Mohs hardness of 5.0 to 5.5 and a specific gravity of 2.4. It is translucent with a refractive index of 1.50. It is fusible at 3.5 on Wolfgang Franz von Kobell's fusibility scale, and soluble in HCl. It commonly contains or is associated with grains of pyrite.

Lazurite is a product of contact metamorphism of limestone and is typically associated with calcite, pyrite, diopside, humite, forsterite, hauyne, and muscovite.

Other blue minerals, such as the carbonate mineral azurite and the phosphate mineral lazulite, may be confused with lazurite, but are easily distinguished with careful examination. At one time, lazurite was a synonym for azurite.

Lazurite was first described in 1890 for an occurrence in the Sar-e-Sang District, Koksha Valley, Badakhshan Province, Afghanistan. It has been mined for more than 6,000 years in the lapis lazuli district of Badakhshan. It has been used as a pigment in painting and cloth dyeing since at least the 6th or 7th century. It is also mined at Lake Baikal in Siberia; Mount Vesuvius; Burma; Canada; and the United States. The name is from the Persian lajvard for blue.

The most important mineral component of lapis lazuli is lazurite. (25% to 40%)

== Redefinition ==
Most lapis lazuli gets its blue color from Hauyne and almost none contain "true lazurite". This was changed in 2021, as lazurite was redefined so that it is enough for a quarter (instead of half) of the cages to contain sulfide.

== Structure ==
Lazurite and hauyne seem to have the same structure and both are sulfate-dominant minerals. Lazurite is a pigment (opalescent) and has a bright blue streak (especially as a component of the semiprecious stone lapis lazuli). Many hauynes have a white or pale blue streak and are translucent. The difference might be a consequence of the redox state (sulfate to sulfide ratio).

== See also ==
- Hauyne – Rare feldspathoid mineral in the sodalite group
- Ultramarine – Deep blue pigment
