= Nosean =

Mineral of the feldspathoid group

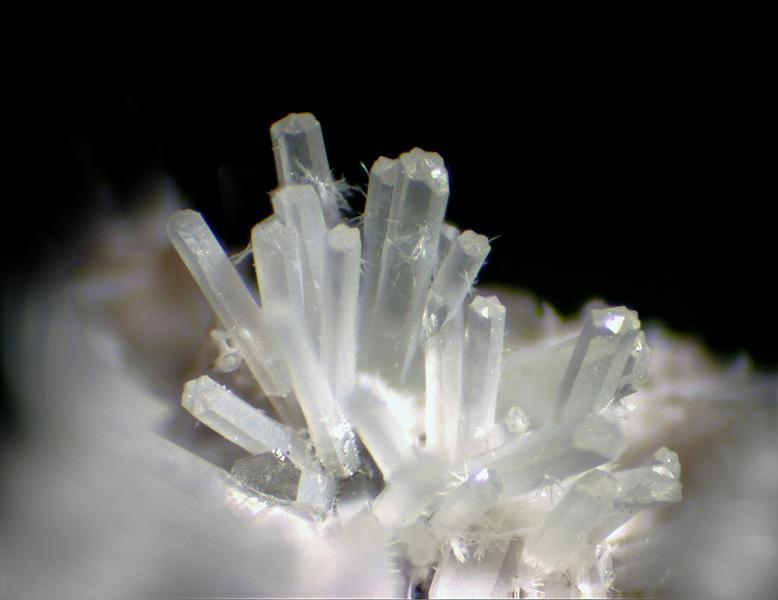
- Nosean crystal group from Ochtendung, Eifel, Germany

General
- Category: Tectosilicate minerals
- Group: Feldspathoid group, sodalite group
- Formula: Na_{8}(Al_{6}Si_{6}O_{24})(SO_{4})·H_{2}O
- IMA symbol: Nsn
- Strunz classification: 9.FB.10
- Crystal system: Cubic
- Crystal class: Hextetrahedral (4̅3m); H-M symbol: (4̅ 3m)
- Space group: P4̅3m

Nosean, also known as noselite, is a mineral of the feldspathoid group with formula: Na_{8}(Al_{6}Si_{6}O_{24})(SO_{4})·H_{2}O. It forms isometric crystals of variable color: white, grey, blue, green, to brown. It has a Mohs hardness of 5.5 to 6 and a specific gravity of 2.3 to 2.4. It is fluorescent. It is found in low-silica igneous rocks. There is a solid solution between nosean and hauyne, which contains calcium.

It was first described in 1815 from the Rhineland in Germany and named after the German mineralogist K. W. Nose (1753–1835). The mineral is rare but widespread, found in such diverse localities as ocean islands (e.g., Tahiti) and the La Sal Range in Utah.
