= Feldspathoid =

Mineral grouping of silica-poor tectosilicates

The feldspathoids are a group of tectosilicate minerals which resemble feldspars but have a different structure and much lower silica content. They occur in rare and unusual types of igneous rocks, and are usually not found in rocks containing primary quartz. A notable exception where feldspathoids and quartz-bearing rocks are found together is the Red Hill Syenite.

Foid, a contraction of the term feldspathoid, is applied to any igneous rock containing up to 60% modal feldspathoid minerals. For example, a syenite with significant nepheline present can be termed a nepheline-bearing syenite or nepheline syenite, with the term nepheline replaceable by any foid mineral. Such terminology is used in the Streckeisen (QAPF) classification of igneous rocks.

== Feldspathoid minerals ==
- Afghanite – Tectosilicate mineral in the feldspathoid group
- Analcime – Zeolite mineral
- Cancrinite – Feldspathoid mineral
- Kalsilite – Vitreous white to grey feldspathoidal mineral
- Leucite – Potassium and aluminium tectosilicate mineral
- Nepheline – Silica-undersaturated aluminosilicate mineral
- Sodalite Group
  - Hauyne – Rare feldspathoid mineral in the sodalite group
  - Lazurite – Alumino-silicate mineral whose blue colour is due to a sulfide species and not copper
  - Nosean – Mineral of the feldspathoid group
  - Sodalite – Blue tectosilicate mineral
  - Tugtupite – Feldspathoid mineral in the sodalite group
