= Leucite =

Potassium and aluminium tectosilicate mineral

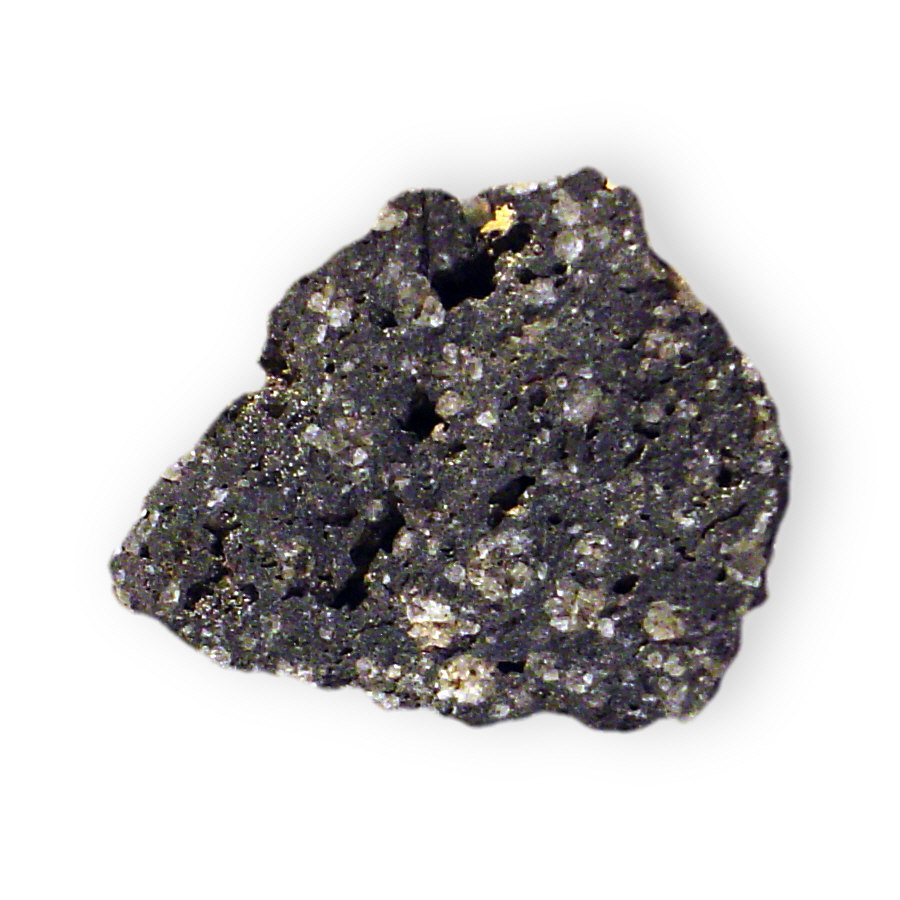
- Leucite crystals in a rock from Italy

General
- Category: Tectosilicate minerals
- Group: Feldspathoid group
- Formula: KAlSi_{2}O_{6}
- IMA symbol: Lct
- Strunz classification: 9.GB.05
- Crystal system: Tetragonal
- Crystal class: Dipyramidal (4/m) (same H-M symbol)
- Space group: I4_{1}/a
- Unit cell: a = 13.056, c = 13.751 [Å]; Z = 16

Identification
- Color: White to grey
- Crystal habit: Commonly as euhedral, pseudocubic crystals; rarely granular, massive
- Twinning: Common and repeated on {110} and {101}
- Cleavage: Poor on {110}
- Fracture: Conchoidal
- Tenacity: Brittle
- Mohs scale hardness: 5.5–6
- Luster: Vitreous
- Streak: White
- Diaphaneity: Transparent to translucent
- Specific gravity: 2.45–2.50
- Optical properties: Uniaxial (+)
- Refractive index: n_{ω} = 1.508 n_{ε} = 1.509
- Birefringence: δ = 0.001

Leucite (from the Greek word leukos meaning white) is a rock-forming mineral of the feldspathoid group, silica-undersaturated and composed of potassium and aluminium tectosilicate KAlSi_{2}O_{6}. Crystals have the form of cubic icositetrahedra but, as first observed by Sir David Brewster in 1821, they are not optically isotropic, and are therefore pseudo-cubic. Goniometric measurements made by Gerhard vom Rath in 1873 led him to refer the crystals to the tetragonal system. Optical investigations have since proved the crystals to be still more complex in character, and to consist of several orthorhombic or monoclinic individuals, which are optically biaxial and repeatedly twinned, giving rise to twin-lamellae and to striations on the faces. When the crystals are raised to a temperature of about 500 °C they become optically isotropic and the twin-lamellae and striations disappear, although they reappear when the crystals are cooled again. This pseudo-cubic character of leucite is very similar to that of the mineral boracite. Leucite is commonly found in igneous rocks, especially at Mt. Vesuvius

The crystals are white or ash-grey in colour, hence the name suggested by A. G. Werner in 1701, from λευκος, '(matt) white'. They are transparent and glassy when fresh, albeit with a noticeably subdued 'subvitreous' lustre due to the low refractive index, but readily alter to become waxy/greasy and then dull and opaque; they are brittle and break with a conchoidal fracture. The Mohs hardness is 5.5, and the specific gravity 2.47. Inclusions of other minerals, arranged in concentric zones, are frequently present in the crystals. On account of the color and form of the crystals the mineral was early known as 'white garnet'. French authors in older literature may employ René Just Haüy's name amphigène, but 'leucite' is the only name for this mineral species that is recognised as official by the International Mineralogical Association.
