= Fluoride phosphate =

Class of chemical compounds

The fluoride phosphates or phosphate fluorides are inorganic double salts that contain both fluoride and phosphate anions. In mineralogy, Hey's Chemical Index of Minerals groups these as 22.1. The Nickel-Strunz grouping is 8.BN.

Related mixed anion compounds are the chloride phosphates, the fluoride arsenates and fluoride vanadates.

They are distinct from the fluorophosphates: monofluorophosphate, difluorophosphate and hexafluorophosphate which have fluorine bonds to the phosphorus.

== Minerals ==
name	formula	ratio PO_{4}:F	formula weight	crystal system	space group	unit cell	volume	density	refractive index	comment	reference
Althausite	Mg_{4}(PO_{4})_{2}(OH,O)(F,☐)	2:~1		Orthorhombic	Pnma	a = 8.258 b = 6.054, c = 14.383	719.06	2.97	Biaxial (+) n_{α} = 1.588 n_{β} = 1.592 n_{γ} = 1.598 2V: measured: 70° , calculated: 80° Max birefringence: δ = 0.010		
Amblygonite	LiAl(PO_{4})F	1:1		Triclinic	P1̅	a = 6.644 b = 7.744 c = 6.91 α = 90.35°, β = 117.33°, γ = 91.01° Z=4	315.75	3.04-3.11	Biaxial (-) n_{α} = 1.577 - 1.591 n_{β} = 1.592 - 1.605 n_{γ} = 1.596 - 1.613 2V: Measured: 107° to 129.5° Birefringence: 0.020		
aravaite	Ba_{2}Ca_{18}(SiO_{4})_{6}(PO_{4})_{3}(CO_{3})F_{3}O	3:3		trigonal	R3̅m	a = 7.1255, c = 66.290 Z=3	2914.8				
Arctite	Na_{2}Ca_{4}(PO_{4})_{3}F	3:1		Trigonal	R3̅m	a = 7.078 c = 41.203 Z=6	1,787.64	3.13	Uniaxial (-) n_{ω} = 1.578 n_{ε} = 1.577 Birefringence: 0.001		
Ariegilatite	BaCa_{12}(SiO_{4})_{4}(PO_{4})_{2}F_{2}O			Trigonal	R3̅m	a = 7.1551 c = 41.303	1381.2		Uniaxial (-) n_{ω} = 1.650 n_{ε} = 1.647 Max Birefringence: δ = 0.003		
Babefphite	BaBePO_{4}(F,OH)	1:~1		Tetragonal					Uniaxial (+) n_{ω} = 1.629 n_{ε} = 1.632 Max birefringence: δ = 0.003		
Belovite-(Ce)	NaCeSr_{3}(PO_{4})_{3}F	3:1		Trigonal	P3̅	a = 9.692 c = 7.201	585.80	4.19	Uniaxial (-) n_{ω} = 1.653 - 1.660 n_{ε} = 1.634 - 1.640 Birefringence: 0.015		
Belovite-(La)	NaLaSr_{3}(PO_{4})_{3}F	3:1		Trigonal	P3̅	a = 9.647 c = 7.17	577.88	4.19	Uniaxial (-) n_{ω} = 1.653 n_{ε} = 1.635 - 1.636 Max birefringence: δ = 0.018		
Bøggildite	Na_{2}Sr_{2}Al_{2}PO_{4}F_{9}	1:9		Monoclinic					Biaxial (+) n_{α} = 1.462 n_{β} = 1.466 n_{γ} = 1.469 2V: 80° Max birefringence:δ = 0.007		
Carlgieseckeite-(Nd)	NaNdCa_{3}(PO_{4})_{3}F			Trigonal	P3̅	a = 9.4553 c = 6.9825	540.62	3.91			
Cloncurryite	Cu_{0.5}(VO)_{0.5}Al_{2}(PO_{4})_{2}F_{2} · 5H_{2}O	2:2		Monoclinic	P2_{1}/b	a = 4.9573 b = 12.1824 c = 18.9749 β = 90.933° Z=4	1145.78	2.525	Biaxial (-) n_{α} = 1.548(2) n_{γ} = 1.550(2) 2V: calculated: 56° Max brefringence: δ = 0.002		
Deloneite	(Na_{0.5}REE_{0.25}Ca_{0.25})(Ca_{0.75}REE_{0.25})Sr_{1.5}(CaNa_{0.25}REE_{0.25})(PO_{4})_{3}F_{0.5}(OH)_{0.5}			Trigonal	P3	a = 9.51 c = 7.01 Z=2	549.05	3.92	Uniaxial (-) n_{ω} = 1.682 n_{ε} = 1.660 Max birefringence: δ = 0.022		
Fluellite	Al_{2}(PO_{4})F_{2}(OH) · 7H_{2}O			Orthorhombic	Fddd	a = 11.22 b = 21.15 c = 8.54	2,027	2.139 - 2.17	Biaxial (+) n_{α} = 1.473 - 1.490 n_{β} = 1.490 - 1.496 n_{γ} = 1.506 - 1.511 Max birefringence: δ = 0.033		
Fluorapatite	Ca_{5}(PO_{4})_{3}F	3:1		Hexagonal	P6_{3}/m	a = 9.3973 c = 6.8782	526.03	3.1-3.25	Uniaxial (-) n_{ω} = 1.631 - 1.650 n_{ε} = 1.627 - 1.646 Birefringence: 0.004		
Fluorcaphite	SrCaCa_{3}(PO_{4})_{3}F	3:1		Hexagonal	P6_{3}/m	a = 9.485 c = 7.000 Z=2	545.39		Uniaxial (-) n_{ω} = 1.649 n_{ε} = 1.637 Max birefringence: δ = 0.012		
Fluorphosphohedyphane	Ca_{2}Pb_{3}(PO_{4})_{3}F	3:1		Hexagonal	P6_{3}/m	a = 9.640, c = 7.012 Z=2	564.4	5.445	Uniaxial (-) n_{ω} = 1.836 n_{ε} = 1.824 Max birefringence: δ = 0.012		
Fluorstrophite	SrCaSr_{3}(PO_{4})_{3}F	3:1		Hexagonal	P6_{3}/m	a = 9.565 c = 7.115 Z=2	563.74		Uniaxial (-) n_{ω} = 1.651 n_{ε} = 1.637 Max birefringence: δ = 0.014		
Francolite											
Herderite	CaBe(PO_{4})F			Monoclinic		a = 4.81, b = 7.7 c = 9.82 β = 90.1°	363.7	3.02	Biaxial (-) n_{α} = 1.556 - 1.592 n_{β} = 1.578 - 1.610 n_{γ} = 1.589 - 1.620 2V: calculated: 70° Max birefringence: δ = 0.033		
Iangreyite	Ca_{2}Al_{7}(PO_{4})_{2}(PO_{3}OH)_{2}(OH,F)_{15} · 8H_{2}O	4:~15		Trigonal	P3 2 1	a = 6.988 c = 16.707	706.5				
Isokite	CaMg(PO_{4})F			Monoclinic	B2/b	a = 6.52 b = 8.75 c = 7.51 β = 121.47°	365.4	3.15-3.27	Biaxial (+) n_{α} = 1.590 n_{β} = 1.595 n_{γ} = 1.615 2V: ,easured: 51° Max birefringence: δ = 0.025		
Kingite	Al_{3}(PO_{4})_{2}F_{2}(OH) · 7H_{2}O	2:2		Triclinic		a = 9.15 b = 10 c = 7.24 α = 98.6°, β = 93.6°, γ = 93.2°			Biaxial		
Kuannersuite-(Ce)	NaCeBa_{3}(PO_{4})_{3}F_{0.5}Cl_{0.5}	6:1		Trigonal	P3̅	a = 9.909 c = 7.402	629.42	4.51			
Lacroixite	NaAl(PO_{4})F	1:1		Monoclinic	B2/b	a = 6.414 b = 8.207 c = 6.885 β = 115.47°	327.20	3.126 - 3.29	Biaxial (-) n_{α} = 1.546 n_{β} = 1.563 n_{γ} = 1.580 2V: measured: 89° Birefringence: 0.034		
Mcauslanite	Fe_{3}Al_{2}(PO_{4})_{3}(PO_{3}OH)F · 18H_{2}O	4:1		Triclinic		a = 10.05 b = 11.56 c = 6.88 α = 105.84°, β = 93.66°, γ = 106.47°	728.7		Biaxial (-) n_{α} = 1.522 n_{β} = 1.531 n_{γ} = 1.534 2V: measured: 55° to 59.7°, calculated: 58° Max birefringence:δ = 0.012		
Minyulite	KAl_{2}(PO_{4})_{2}(OH,F) · 4H_{2}O	2:~1		Orthorhombic	Pba2	a = 9.34 b = 9.74 c = 5.52	502	2.47	Biaxial (+) n_{α} = 1.531 n_{β} = 1.534 n_{γ} = 1.538 2V: measured: 70° , calculated: 82° Max birefringence: δ = 0.007		
Miyahisaite	(Sr,Ca)_{2}Ba_{3}(PO_{4})_{3}F	3:1		Hexagonal	P6_{3}/m	a = 9.921, c = 7.469 Z=2	636.7	4.511			
Morinite	NaCa_{2}Al_{2}(PO_{4})_{2}(OH)F_{4} · 2H_{2}O	2:4		Monoclinic				2.94	Biaxial (-) n_{α} = 1.551 n_{β} = 1.563 n_{γ} = 1.565 2V: measured: 43° , calculated: 44° Max birefringence: δ = 0.014		
Nacaphite	Na_{2}Ca(PO_{4})F			Monoclinic	P2_{1}/b	a = 13.318 b = 7.0964 c = 10.6490 β = 113.526° Z=8	922.81		Biaxial (-) n_{α} = 1.508 n_{β} = 1.515 n_{γ} = 1.520 2V: 80° Max birefringence: δ = 0.012		
natrophosphate	Na_{7}(PO_{4})_{2}F.19H_{2}O	2:1		Isometric	Fd3c	a = 27.79 Z=56	21,461.78	1,71-1.72	Isotropic		
Nefedovite	Na_{5}Ca_{4}(PO_{4})_{4}F	4:1		Triclinic		a = 5.4 Å, b = 11.64 Å, c = 16.48 Å α = 134.99°, β = 90.04°, γ = 89.96°	732.60		Biaxial (+) n_{α} = 1.571 n_{γ} = 1.590 Max birefringence: δ = 0.019		
Nevadaite	(Cu^{2+},Al,V^{3+})_{6}Al_{8}(PO_{4})_{8}F_{8}(OH)_{2} · 22H_{2}O	8:8		Orthorhombic	P2_{1}mn	a = 12.123 b = 18.999 c = 4.961		2.54	Biaxial (-) n_{α} = 1.540 n_{β} = 1.548 n_{γ} = 1.553 2V: measured: 76°, calculated: 76° Max birefringence: δ = 0.013		
Panasqueiraite	CaMg(PO_{4})(OH,F)	1:~1		monoclinic		a = 6.53 b = 8.75 c = 6.91 β = 112.33°	365.2	3.27	Biaxial (+) n_{α} = 1.590 n_{β} = 1.596 n_{γ} = 1.616 2V: measured: 51° , calculated: 58° Max birefringence: δ = 0.026		
Richellite	CaFe^{3+}_{2}(PO_{4})_{2}(OH,F)_{2}	2:~2				a = 5.18 c = 12.61					
Stronadelphite	Sr_{5}(PO_{4})_{3}F	3:1		Hexagonal	P6_{3}/m	a = 9.845 c = 7.383	619.72		Uniaxial (-) n_{ω} = 1.630(1) n_{ε} = 1.623(1) Max birefringence: δ = 0.007		
Triplite	Mn^{2+}_{2}(PO_{4})F	1:1		Monoclinic	P2_{1}/b	a = 11.9 b = 6.52 c = 10.09 β = 105.62°	758.4	3.9	Biaxial (+) n_{α} = 1.650 n_{β} = 1.660 n_{γ} = 1.680 2V: measured: 70° to 90°, calculated: 72° Max birefringence: δ = 0.030		
Väyrynenite	Mn^{2+}Be(PO_{4})(OH,F)	1:~1		Monoclinic	P2_{1}/b	a = 5.411 b = 14.49 c = 4.73 β = 102.75°	361.71	3.22	Biaxial (-) n_{α} = 1.638 - 1.640 n_{β} = 1.658 - 1.662 n_{γ} = 1.664 - 1.667 2V: measured: 46° to 55°, Calculated: 51° to 57° Max birefringence: δ = 0.026 - 0.027		
Viitaniemiite	Na(Ca,Mn^{2+})Al(PO_{4})(F,OH)_{3}	1:~3		Monoclinic		a = 6.83 b = 7.14 c = 5.44 β = 109.37°	250.27		Biaxial (-) n_{α} = 1.557 n_{β} = 1.565 n_{γ} = 1.571 2V: measured: 81° , calculated: 80° Max birefringence: δ = 0.014		
Wagnerite	(Mg,Fe^{2+})_{2}(PO_{4})F	1:1		Monoclinic	P2_{1}/b	a = 9.645 b = 31.659 c = 11.914 β = 108.26(3)°	3454.8	3.15	Biaxial (+) n_{α} = 1.568 n_{β} = 1.572 n_{γ} = 1.582 2V: Measured: 25° to 35° ? Birefringence:0.046 Max birefringence: δ = 0.015		
Wavellite	Al_{3}(PO_{4})_{2}(OH,F)_{3} · 5H_{2}O	2:~3		Orthorhombic		a = 9.621 b = 17.363 c = 6.994	1168.3	2.36	Biaxial (+) n_{α} = 1.518 - 1.535 n_{β} = 1.524 - 1.543 n_{γ} = 1.544 - 1.561 2V: measured: 60° to 72°, calculated: 60° to 70° Max birefringence: δ = 0.026		
Zwieselite	Fe^{2+}_{2}(PO_{4})F	1:1		Monoclinic	P2_{1}/b		753.82		Biaxial (+) n_{α} = 1.686 - 1.696 n_{β} = 1.690 - 1.704 n_{γ} = 1.703 - 1.713 2V: measured: 58° , calculated: 60° Max birefringence: δ = 0.017		
	Na_{5-4.5}PO_{4}(CO_{3},F,Cl)	1:~1									

== Artificial ==
name	formula	formula weight	crystal system	space group	unit cell Å	volume	density	refractive index	comment	reference
EMM-9; 4-(dimethylamino)pyridine fluoroaluminophosphate	(DMAP)_{2}Al_{4}P_{4}O_{17}F_{2}•H_{2}O		monoclinic	P2_{1}/a	a=14.335 b=13.561 c=14.497 β =101.094°				layered	
	KBPO_{4}F		monoclinic	Cc						
Iron-Doped Sodium–Vanadium Fluorophosphate	Na_{3}V_{2–y}O_{2–y}Fe_{y}(PO_{4})_{2}F_{1+y} (y < 0.3)		tetrahedral	P42/mnm	a=9.0277 c=10.6259	866.0				
	Na_{3}V_{2}O_{1.6}(PO_{4})_{2}F_{1.4}									
	Na_{3}V_{2}(PO_{4})_{2}F_{3}									
	Na_{2}MnPO_{4}F									
	(N_{2}H_{5})Fe_{3}(PO_{4})F_{6}		orthorhombic	Imma	a = 7.3527 b = 12.7814 c = 10.764					
α	Na_{2}FePO_{4}F		monoclinic	P2_{1}/c	a = 13.675, b = 5.2503, c = 13.7202, β = 120.230°					
β	Na_{2}FePO_{4}F		orthorhombic							
	RbBPO_{4}F	210.25	cubic	P2_{1}3	a=7.5901 Z=4	437.26	3.194		colourless	
MIL-145	RbGa_{3}(PO_{4})_{2}(HPO_{4})F_{4}·C_{5}N_{2}H_{16}·2H_{2}O	3187.11	monoclinic	P2	a=14.4314 b=9.1152 c=16.7889 β = 112.708 Z=1	2037.30	2.598		colourless	
	K_{2}SnPO_{4}F_{3}	348.86	monoclinic	P2_{1}/c	a=10.039 b=9.415 c=21.602 beta=95.464 Z=12	2032.6	3.420		colourless	
	K_{6}Sn(P_{2}O_{7})_{2}F_{2}	739.17	monoclinic	P2_{1}/c	a=8.515 b=12.400 c=8.403 beta=99.58 Z=29	874.8	2.806		colourless	
	K_{2}Sb(P_{2}O_{7})F		tetragonal	P4bm	a=8.5239 c=5.572 Z=2	404.8	3.223		colourless SHG 4.0×KDP	
	CsBPO_{4}F		cubic	P2_{1}3	a=7.7090 Z=4	458.14	3.736		colourless	
	Na_{2}PrF_{2}(PO_{4})		cubic							
	Na_{2}NdF_{2}(PO_{4})		cubic							
	Na_{2}SmF_{2}(PO_{4})		cubic							
	Na_{2}EuF_{2}(PO_{4})		cubic							
	Na_{2}TbF_{2}(PO_{4})		cubic							
	Na_{2}TmF_{2}(PO_{4})		cubic							
	Sr_{4}Gd_{3}Na_{3}(PO_{4})_{6}F_{2}									
	PbZn(PO_{4})F	386.53	orthorhombic	Pna2_{1}	a=8.985 b=9.381 c=4.8212 Z=4	406.4	6.318		colourless	
