= Siilinjärvi carbonatite =

Carbonatite complex in Finland

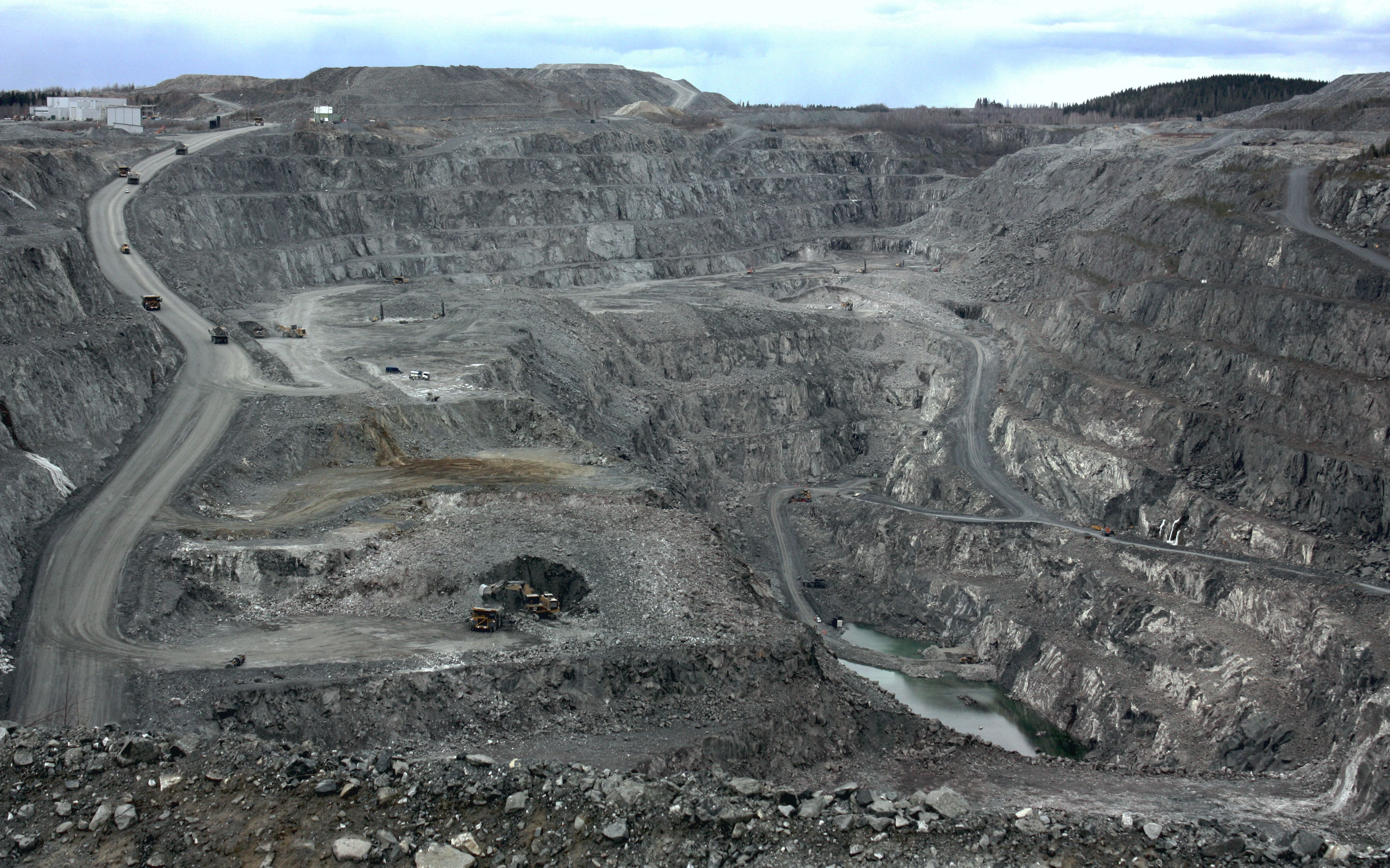
The Särkijärvi main pit seen from southern end of the mine in April 2016

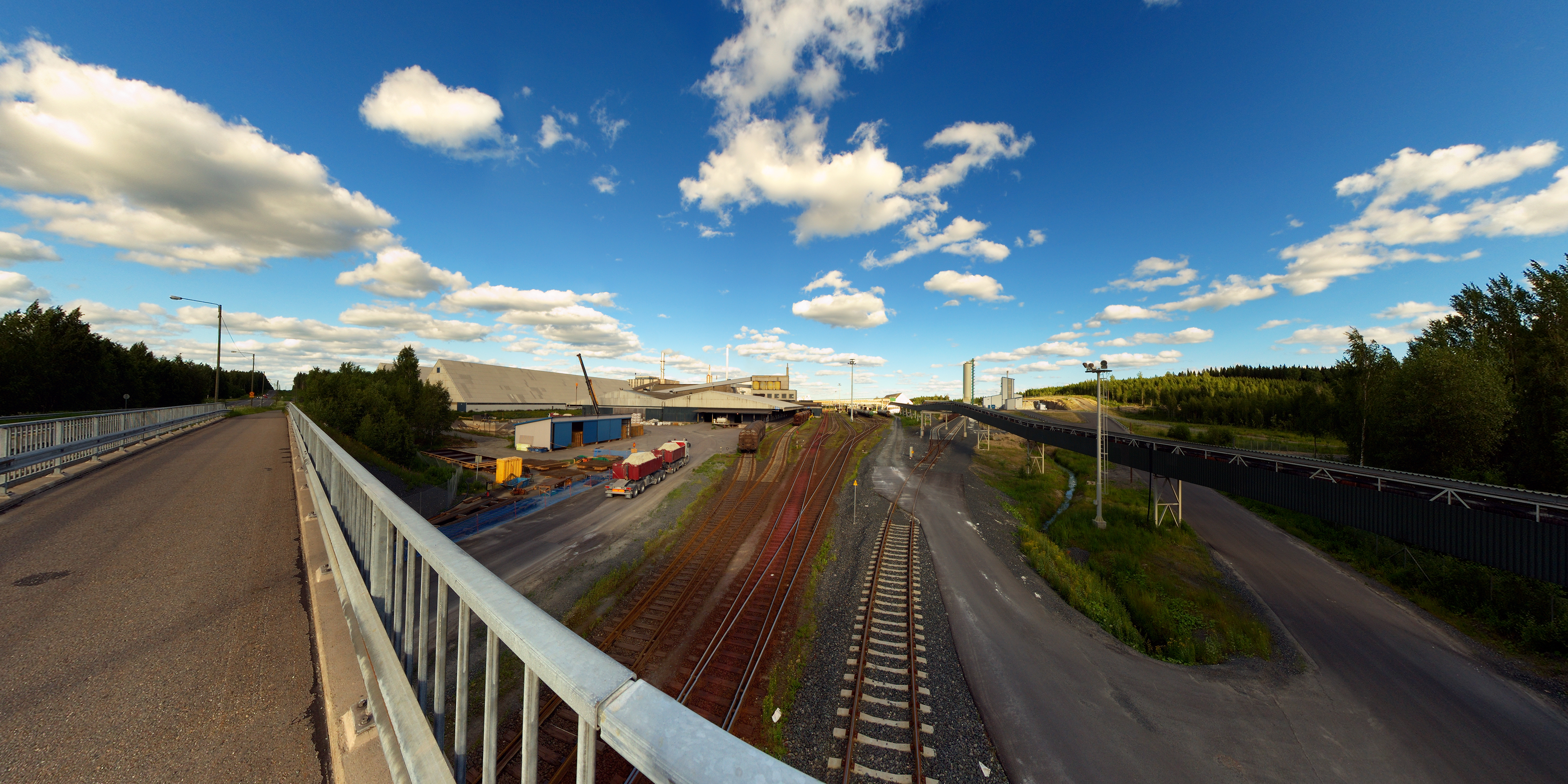
Fertilizer factories near to the mine

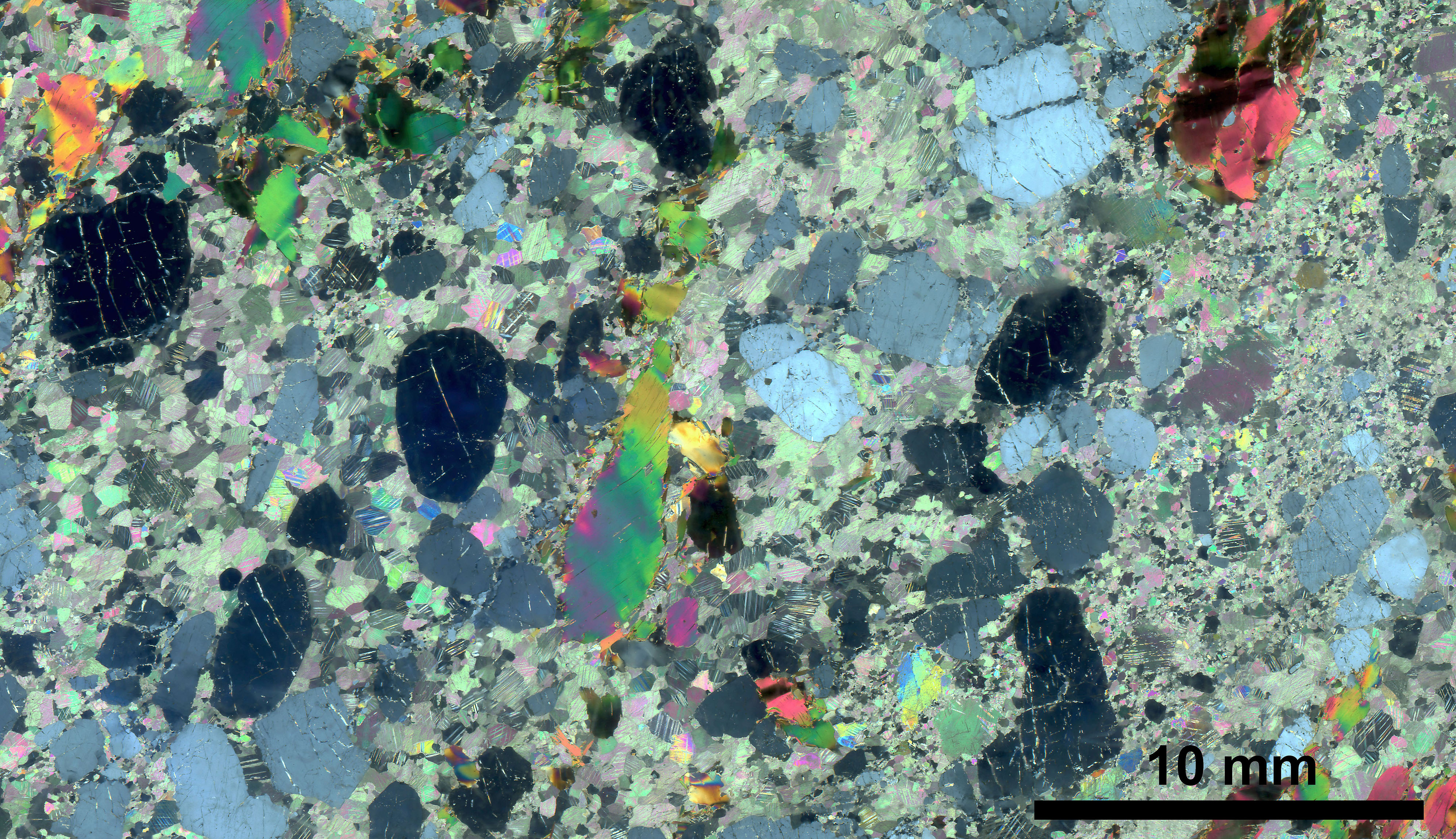
Thin section of apatite-rich carbonatite in cross-polarised transmitted light

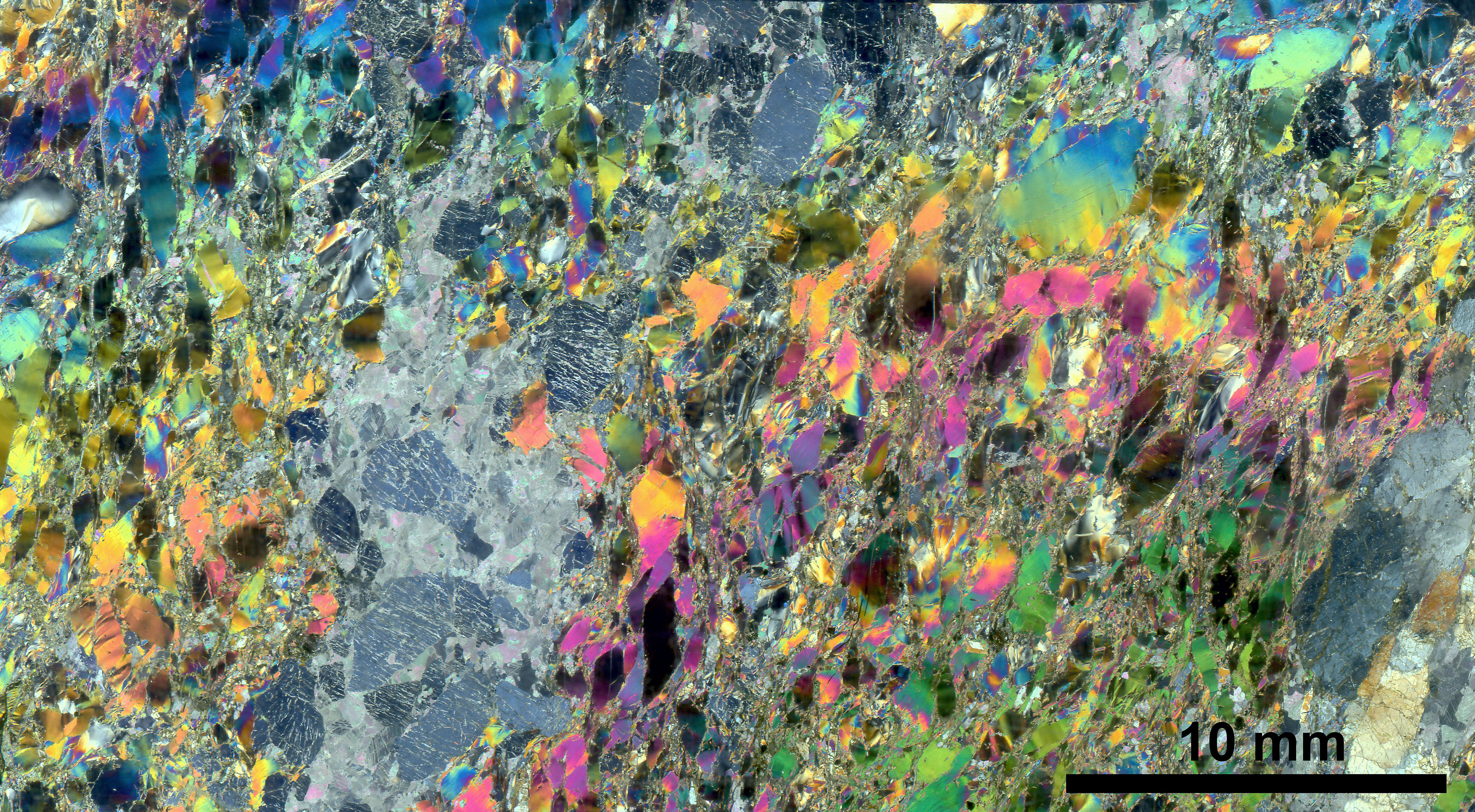
Thin section of apatite-rich glimmerite in cross-polarised transmitted light

The Siilinjärvi carbonatite complex is located in central Finland close to the city of Kuopio. It is named after the nearby town of Siilinjärvi, located approximately 5 km west of the southern extension of the complex. Siilinjärvi is the second largest carbonatite complex in Finland after the Sokli formation, and one of the oldest carbonatites on Earth at 2610±4 Ma. The carbonatite complex consists of a roughly 16 km long steeply dipping lenticular body surrounded by granite gneiss. The maximum width of the body is 1.5 km and the surface area is 14.7 km^{2}. The complex was discovered in 1950 by the Geological Survey of Finland with help of local mineral collectors. The exploration drilling began in 1958 by Lohjan Kalkkitehdas Oy. Typpi Oy continued drilling between years 1964 and 1967, and Apatiitti Oy drilled from 1967 to 1968. After the drillings, the laboratory and pilot plant work were made. The mine was opened by Kemira Oyj in 1979 as an open pit. The operation was sold to Yara in 2007.

The Siilinjärvi apatite mine is the biggest open pit in Finland. Currently the mine comprises two pits; the larger southern Särkijärvi and the smaller northern Saarinen satellite pit. The Särkijärvi pit is approximately 250 m deep, with a bench height of 28 m. The Saarinen pit is located some 5 km north of the main Särkijärvi pit.

The overall blast rate at the mine is 600 kt per week, 450 kt from the Särkijärvi pit and 150 kt from the Saarinen pit. Almost all of the glimmerite-carbonatite series rocks are ore-grade rocks; the fenites and crosscutting diabases are waste rocks. There are, however, some late apatite-poor carbonatite veins and certain blocks of carbonatite-glimmerite with < 0.5 wt-% P_{2}O_{5}. The reason why those are barren of apatite is unknown, but it could be related to metamorphism and fluid flow.

The Siilinjärvi mine is the only operating phosphorus mine in the European Union. Since 1979, over 400 Mt of rock have been mined, about 65% being ore. By year 2016, the mine had produced 24.7 Mt of the main product, apatite. Ore reserves were 205 Mt in January 2016. The current production is roughly 11 Mt of ore per year, while the average in situ grade is 4.0 wt-% of P_{2}O_{5}. Roughly 85% of the apatite concentrate is processed on-site in Siilinjärvi to produce phosphoric acid and fertilisers, the rest of the concentrate is used in the company's other factories. The by-products are mica and calcite concentrates. Apatite concentrate is produced by flotation in the concentrator near the Särkijärvi pit. The concentrate can be then processed into phosphoric acid using sulfuric acid. The sulfuric acid is currently derived from Pyhäsalmi mine pyrite.

== Surrounding rocks ==
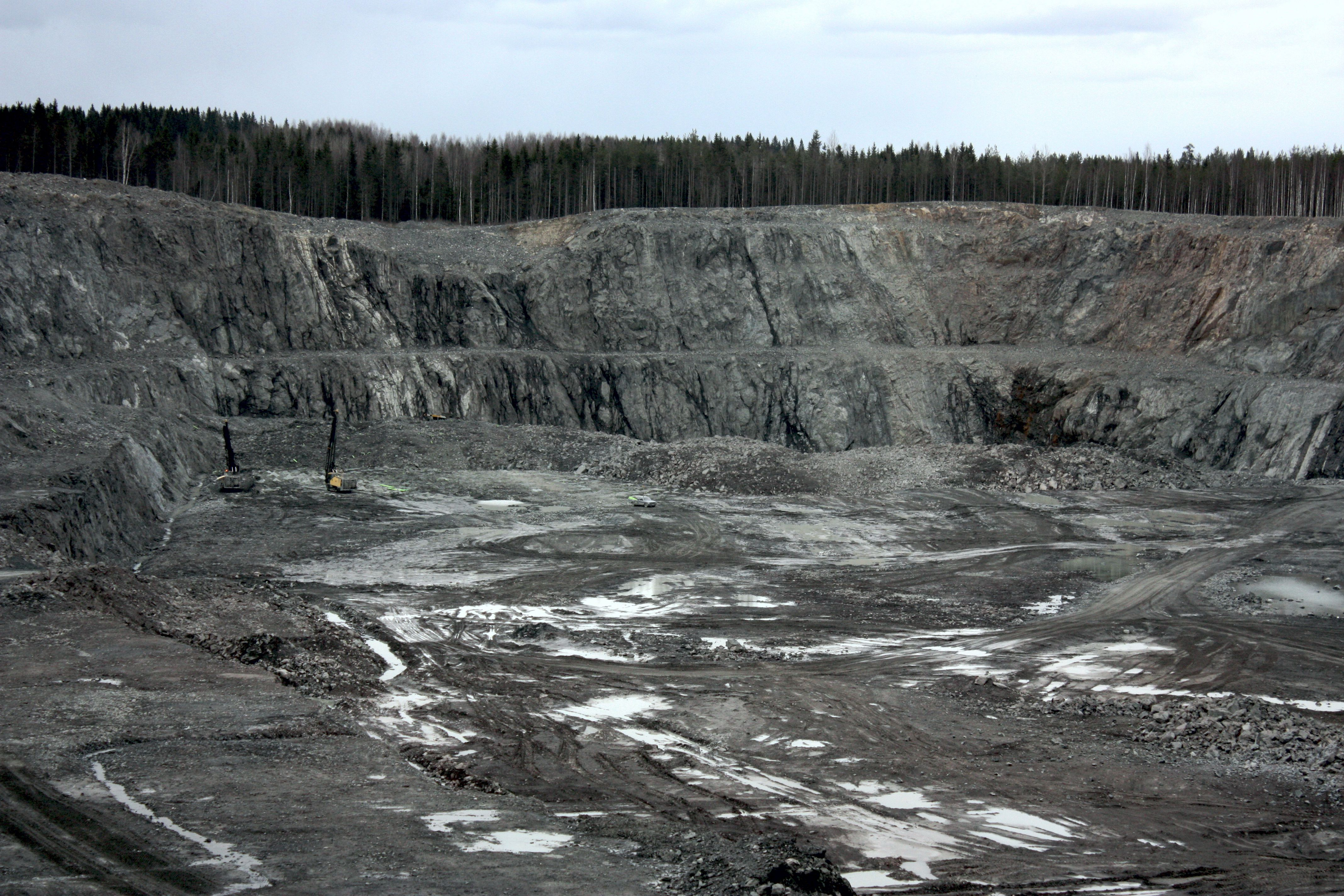
Saarinen satellite pit

The surrounding bedrock of Siilinjärvi intrusion is Archean, although the boundary between the Archean and Paleoproterozoic bedrock is near-by. The nearest Paleoproterozoic rocks belong to the North Savo Black Schist area.

The glimmerite-carbonatite intrusion in Siilinjärvi is located in the south-eastern part of the Iisalmi granite-gneiss terrain. The terrane records both some of the youngest and oldest Archean events in the Fennoscandian Shield, the 2.6 Ga Siilinjärvi intrusion and nearly 3.2 Ga mesosomes found in granulites. Seismic studies have shown that the crustal thickness inside the Iisalmi terrane is unusually thick, some 55–60 km. The terranes thickness is due to several processes, such as thrust-stacking during the Svecofennian collision and post-collisional underplating. At the present erosion level the western part of the terrane is mostly metamorphosed at greenschist facies during the Svecofennian orogeny.

The dominating surrounding rock type in the Siilinjärvi area is a granite gneiss with varying texture and to some extent, mineralogy. The main minerals are plagioclase feldspar, quartz, microcline feldspar, biotite, and hornblende. The surrounding granite gneiss extends some 100 km to the north from Siilinjärvi. The Karelian (2.0-1.9 Ga) sedimentary rocks occur in the west and north-west of Siilinjärvi. The rocks are folded mica schist-like gneisses.

The gabbros of Lapinlahti and Siilinjärvi are from the Archean Karelian orogeny. A fine-grained quartz-diorite, which intrudes the surrounding granitic gneiss, is located at the north-eastern side of the Siilinjärvi gabbro.

== Rock types of the complex ==
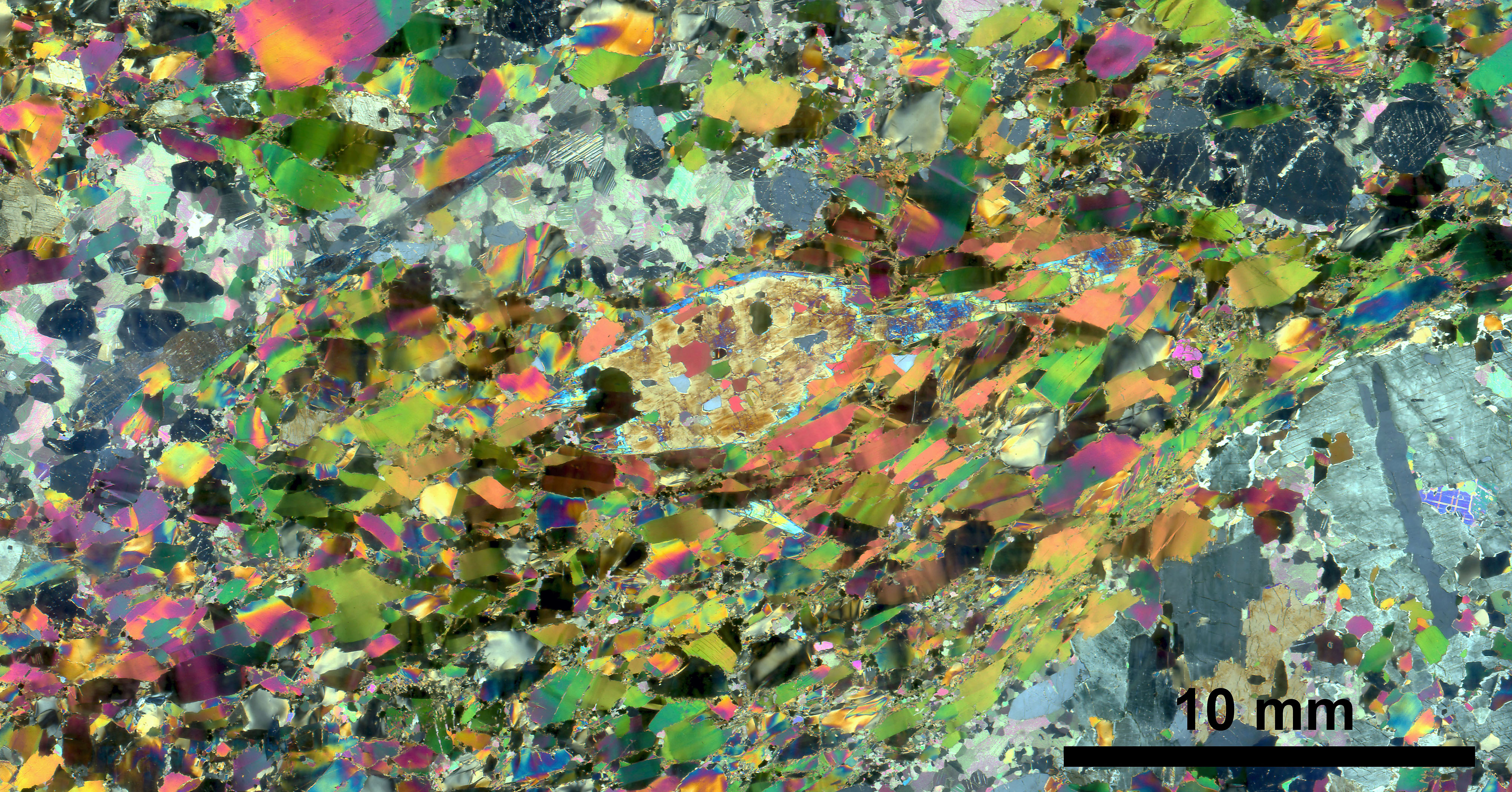
Glimmerite. Scanned image of thin section from Siilinjärvi apatite ore in cross-polarised transmitted light

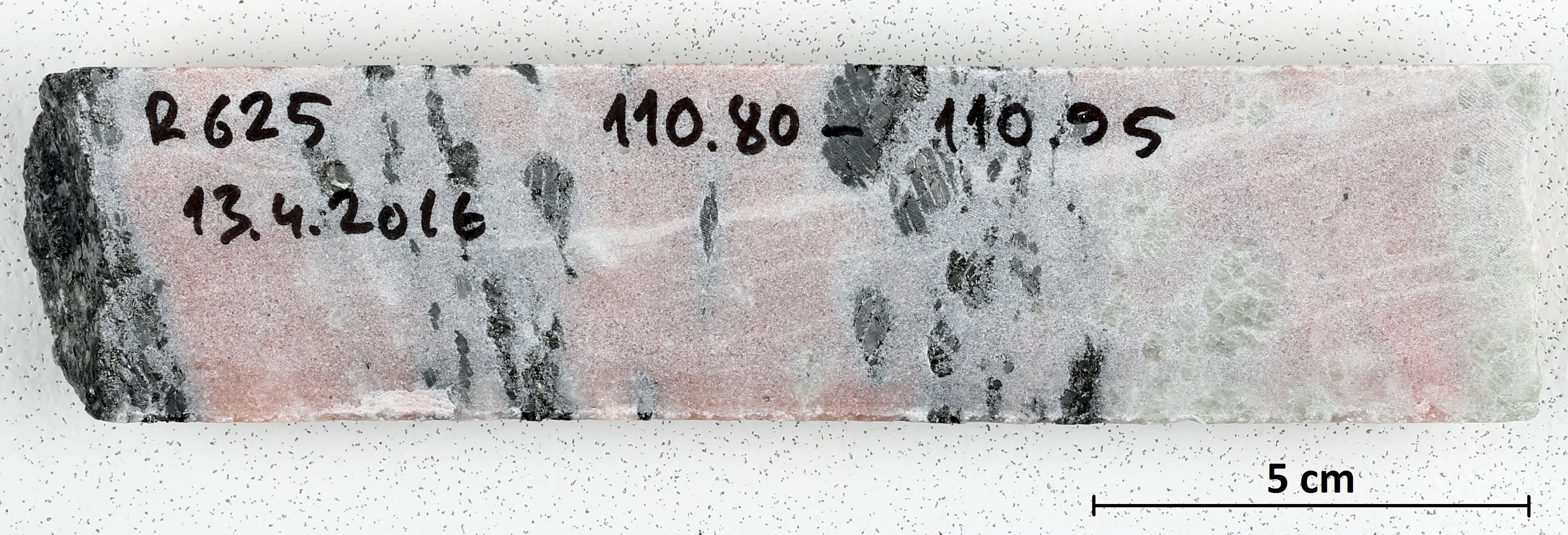
A drill core sample from Siilinjärvi

Five different rocks characterise the Siilinjärvi mine: glimmerite-carbonatite series rocks, fenites, diabase dykes, tonalite-diorites, and gneisses. Apatite is associated with the glimmerite-carbonatites.

Commonly, carbonatite complexes contain a core of intruded carbonatite which cuts a sequence of phlogopite-rich rocks. In Siilinjärvi, however, the glimmerites and carbonatites are well mixed and occur as subvertical to vertical laminated nearly pure glimmerites and nearly pure carbonatites. The volume of the carbonatite is greater in the center of the intrusion, and rocks near the edges of the body are almost completely glimmerites.

=== Ore-bearing rocks ===
The central ore body comprises glimmerites and carbonatites. The phlogopite-rich ore-bearing rocks vary from almost pure glimmerite to carbonate-glimmerite and silicocarbonates. Carbonatites, which contain more than 50% carbonates, represent only about 1.5 vol% of the main intrusion. These carbonatite rocks are more abundant in the center of the intrusion and they occur as thin veins in glimmerite. The ore body also contains blue-green rocks which are composed up to 50 modal% of richterite. The main minerals of the ore rocks are tetraferriphlogopite, calcite, dolomite, apatite, and richterite. Zircon, magnetite, pyrrhotite, chalcopyrite, and pyroxenes occur as accessory minerals. The apatite is fluorapatite and the amount of CO_{2} varies.

Glimmerite is intensely foliated, greenish black, dark, or reddish brown rock (depending on the dominating mica mineral) containing 0-15 % carbonate minerals. The oriented rocks are fine- to medium-grained and usually porphyritic. The matrix is composed of fine-grained, aphanitic phlogopite and the porphyroclasts are tabular phlogopite grains. The fine-grained glimmerites are often more equigranular. The mineral composition of the glimmerites are on average 82% phlogopite, 8% apatite, 7% amphiboles, 2% calcite, and 1% dolomite. At some areas, the apatite content is so high that the rock is named as apatite rock (at least 25% apatite). Apatite occurs as grand sized grains in these rocks, and the diameter of the crystals can be up to several decimeters. Accessory minerals of the glimmerites include ilmenite, magnetite, and pyrochlore.

The carbonate-glimmerites are lighter coloured rocks compared to the pure glimmerites. That is obviously because of the carbonate content (15-25 % carbonate minerals), but also because of the lighter, reddish brown colour of the mica. They are less oriented than the glimmerites and more equigranular. The grain size is medium. The mineral composition of the carbonate-glimmerites are on average 64% phlogopite, 10% apatite, 10% calcite, 9% dolomite, and 7% amphiboles.

The silicocarbonates contain 25-50 % carbonate minerals and are quite light coloured, the shade is dependent on the mica colour. The texture is quite similar to the carbonate-glimmerites, excluding the areas, where the carbonates and micas are banded and occur as their own phases. The average mineral composition is 46% phlogopite, 22% dolomite, 19% calcite, 9% apatite, and 4% amphiboles, although the amount of calcite should be higher than the one of dolomites. The accessory minerals of the silicocarbonates include strontianite, barite, zircon, ilmenite, and magnetite.

The carbonatitic rocks (> 50% carbonates) in Siilinjärvi are brecciated and are mostly composed of calcite, dolomite, and apatite. The accessory minerals include phlogopite, ilmenite, and magnetite. Generally, the dolomite content of the carbonate rocks varies quite a lot. The content is mostly very low and the rock consist mainly of calcite but, in some areas, the dolomite content can be as high as 50%. The Siilinjärvi carbonates are light grey, white, or slightly reddish fine- to medium-grained rocks with average grain size about 0.9-1.2 mm. These rocks occur commonly as vertical dykes.

=== Fenites ===
Fenites surround the ore-bearing rocks in the Siilinjärvi complex. They were formed metasomatically when the carbonatite-glimmerite rocks intruded into the granite gneiss host. The fenites consist mainly of perthitic microcline, richterite amphibole, and pyroxene, but there also are a wide variety of fenite types that include minerals like pyroxene, amphibole, carbonate, quartz, apatite, and quartz-aegirine. The fenites are also found as xenoliths in the glimmerite-carbonatites. The most common fenite type is a reddish or greenish grey rock with varying grain size. Microcline content of the fenites is on average about 50% and the microcline is abundant in perthite. The amount of plagioclase varies much more, and the highest percentages found are about 20-30 %. Anorthoclase content on individual plagioclase grains is 10-15 %. Amphibole percentage is 0-30 % and pyroxene percentage 0-15 % of the rock. Some fenite types contain as much as 15% biotite.

=== Cross-cutting dykes ===
Basaltic diabase dykes crosscut the entire Siilinjärvi complex. Their width varies from a couple of centimetres up to 60 metres. The diabase dykes have a very distinct northwest–southeast or north-northwest–south-southeast vertical orientation. The diabases are dark green, almost black aphanitic rocks without macroscopic orientation. The hornblende content of the Siilinjärvi diabases is 50-70 %, and plagioclase content is 25-40 %. The hornblende is altered to biotite in contact zones, and the plagioclase is albitic. The altered margins of the hornblende dyke are about 50 cm wide. The accessory minerals include titanite, epidote, pyrite, apatite, quartz, and zircon. The preliminary studies show that there are at least three different diabase varieties: calcite-bearing, sulfide-bearing, and barren diabase. The sulfide content is higher in the more sheared rocks.

The melasyenite, which crosscuts all the other parts of the complex but the diabase dykes, is composed of alkali feldspar, biotite, alkaline amphibole, apatite, and magnetite. The mafic melasyenite dyke is 4 km long and 20–30 m wide and appears to have a lamprophyric character. It is located in the northern part of the complex and is possibly related to the same intrusive event as the carbonatite.

== Minerals of the Siilinjärvi intrusion ==
Most common minerals of the Siilinjärvi intrusion are micas, carbonates, apatites, and amphiboles. The average composition of the Siilinjärvi ore is 65% phlogopite (including tetraferriphlogopite), 19% carbonates (calcite/dolomite ratio 4:1), 10% apatite (equivalent to 4% P_{2}O_{5} in the whole rock), 5% richterite, and 1% accessory minerals (mainly magnetite and zircon).

=== Micas ===
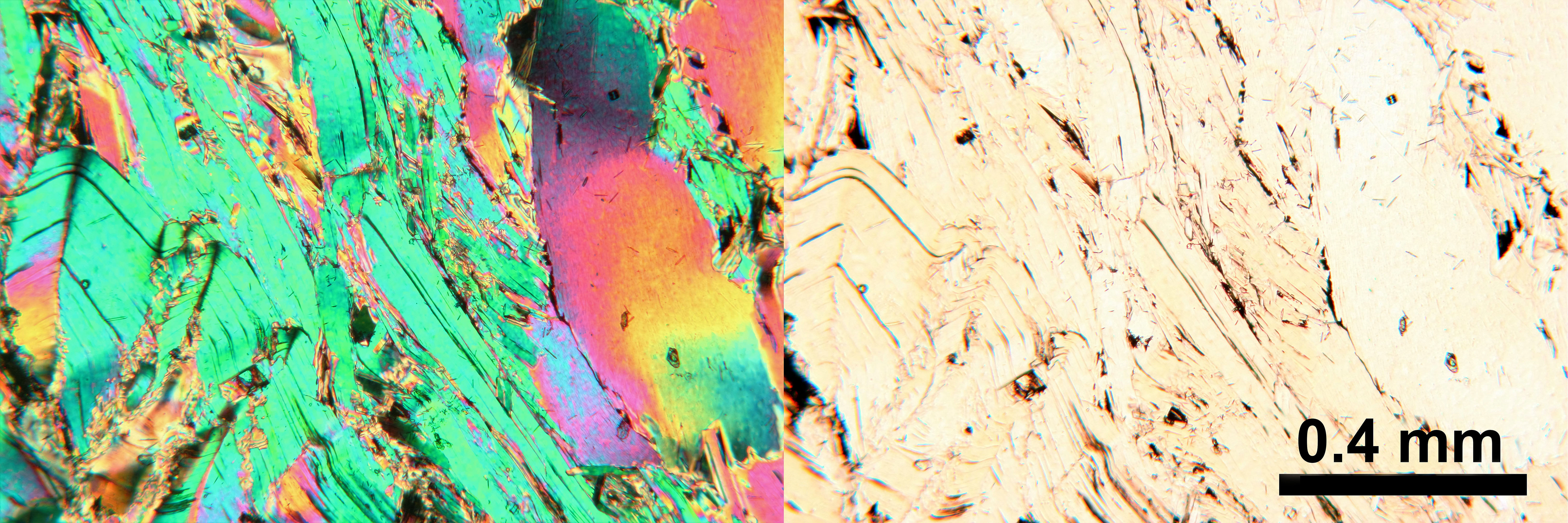
Tetraferriphlogopite grains. Photomicrograph from thin section in cross- and plane-polarised light

The most common mica mineral in Siilinjärvi complex is tetraferriphlogopite, which comprises 65% of the intrusion. Some glimmerites contain over 90% tetraferriphlogopite. The colour of the mineral is black or greenish black, dark brown, or reddish brown. The colour is dependent on the host rock and the intensity of the deformation of the rock. The reddish brown mica usually occurs with the carbonate-glimmerites and the black mica occurs with the glimmerites. Phlogopites show very strong red-brown to pinkish yellow reverse pleocroism, which is due to high Fe^{3+} contents. The phlogopite of Siilinjärvi is sold as soil conditioner under the trade name “Yara biotite”.

Phlogopite occurs as disseminated flakes, tabular crystals, and lamellar or foliated aggregates. The grain size of the micas varies from only a couple of μm to several centimetres, the average size is 1–2 mm in diameter. The phlogopite is altered into brown biotite-phlogopite in the shear zones, and in the most intensely sheared zones, into biotite and chlorite. The most common inclusion mineral in micas is magnetite, but generally the inclusions are rare. Some zircon inclusions can also be found.

=== Carbonates ===
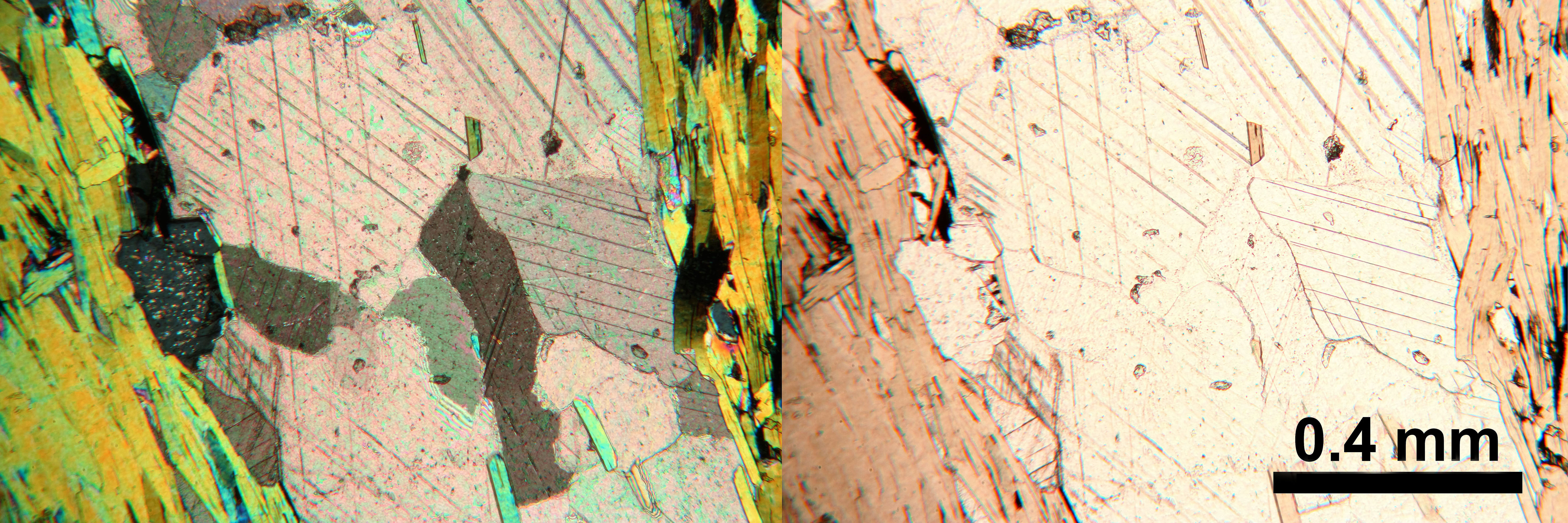
Carbonate vein. Photomicrograph from thin section in cross- and plane-polarised light

The dolomite of Siilinjärvi is yellowish or brownish white and it is hard to distinguish from calcite. The most common form of dolomite is roundish anhedral grains with diameter of 0.2-0.4 mm. The dolomites are also found as large, almost euhedral, grains with diameter of 4–6 mm. Other common textures are myrmekite and exsolution lamellae with calcite. Euhedral grains are only found in carbonatites. The microprobe studies of Siilinjärvi dolomite show homogeneous compositions with low FeO-, SrO-, and MnO –content.

=== Apatites ===
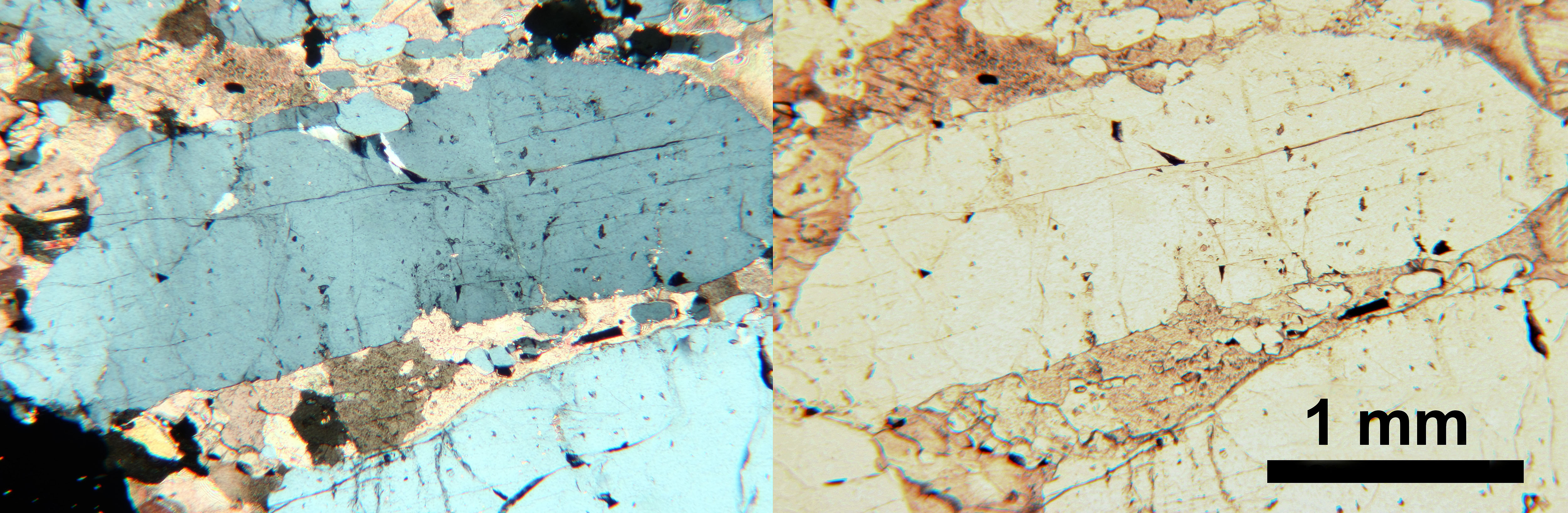
Fluorapatite grains in carbonate groundmass. The sample is taken from non-sheared ore, and apatite grains are large, rounded, and elongated. Photomicrograph from thin section in cross- and plane-polarised light.

The apatite in Siilinjärvi is mainly fluorapatite, but also carbonate-fluorapatite can be found. The ore-bearing rocks of Siilinjärvi contain roughly equal amounts (about 10%) of light green to grey apatite. The amount of fluorine is about 2-4 wt-% in the Siilinjärvi apatite. The apatites of the mine contain quite high amounts of SrO, and sometimes also CO_{2}. Apatite is found in companion with mica in mica rich rocks and with calcite, dolomite, or mica in carbonate-rich rocks.

Typically, the apatite occurs as rounded grains or as hexagonal prismatic crystals. The grain size varies from 10 μm to several decimeters in diameter, so the deposit is disseminated. Usually the grain size of apatite is bigger in the carbonates and smaller in the deformed areas. The hexagonal rods and cross sections are sparse in deformed areas, where the grains are disintegrated and broken. The inclusions in the apatite are more abundant in the sheared parts of the ore. The amount is also greater in bigger grains compared to smaller ones. Some grains do not have inclusions at all. The most common inclusion minerals are carbonates, mostly dolomite. Opaques appear also as inclusions, but they are rare.

=== Amphiboles ===
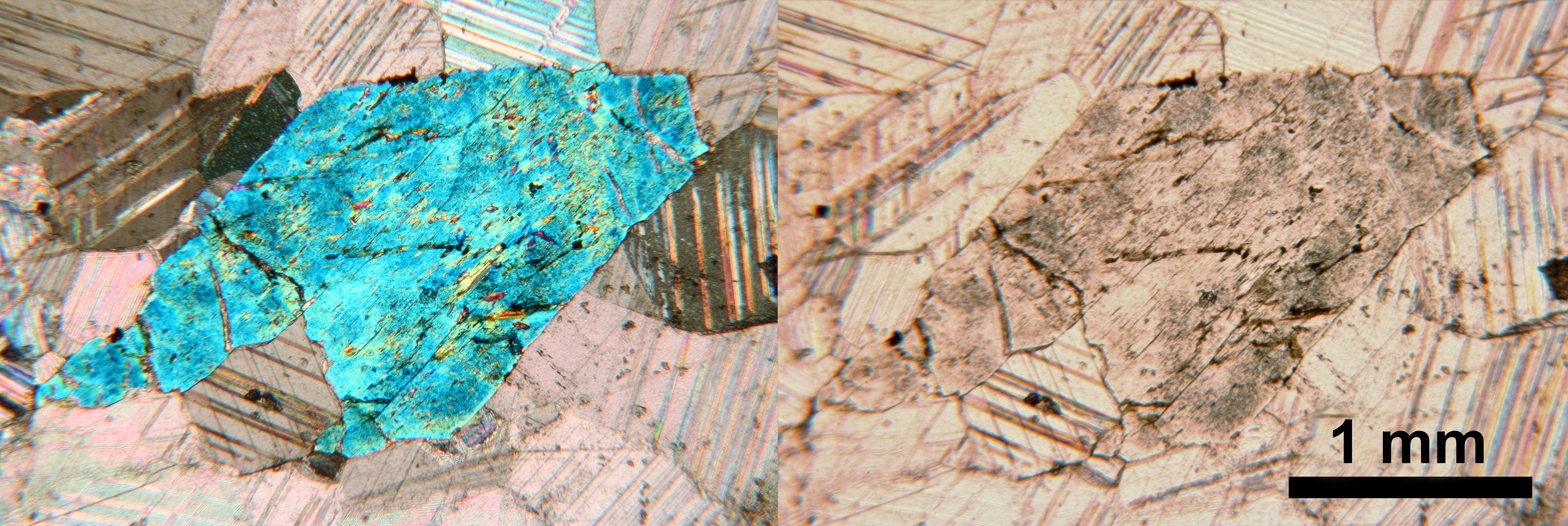
Almost euhedral amphibole crystal in carbonate groundmass. Photomicrograph from thin section in cross- and plane-polarised light.

The most common amphibole in Siilinjärvi is blue-green richterite, which forms about 5% of the overall volume of the intrusion and usually less than 15 vol-% of the glimmerites. The greatest percentages of amphiboles are found in the sheared parts of the ore glimmerites, where the percentage can be locally up to 40-50 %. Some carbonatite veins do not have amphiboles at all. The amphiboles of Siilinjärvi are usually subhedral and the typical grain size is about 0.1 mm. However, the grain size varies quite a lot, and large crystals with diameter of several centimeters are not uncommon. The largest found crystal clusters are up to 30 cm long. Inclusions are rare and the inclusion minerals are most commonly phlogopite and opaques. Altering of the mineral is uncommon.

=== Accessory minerals ===
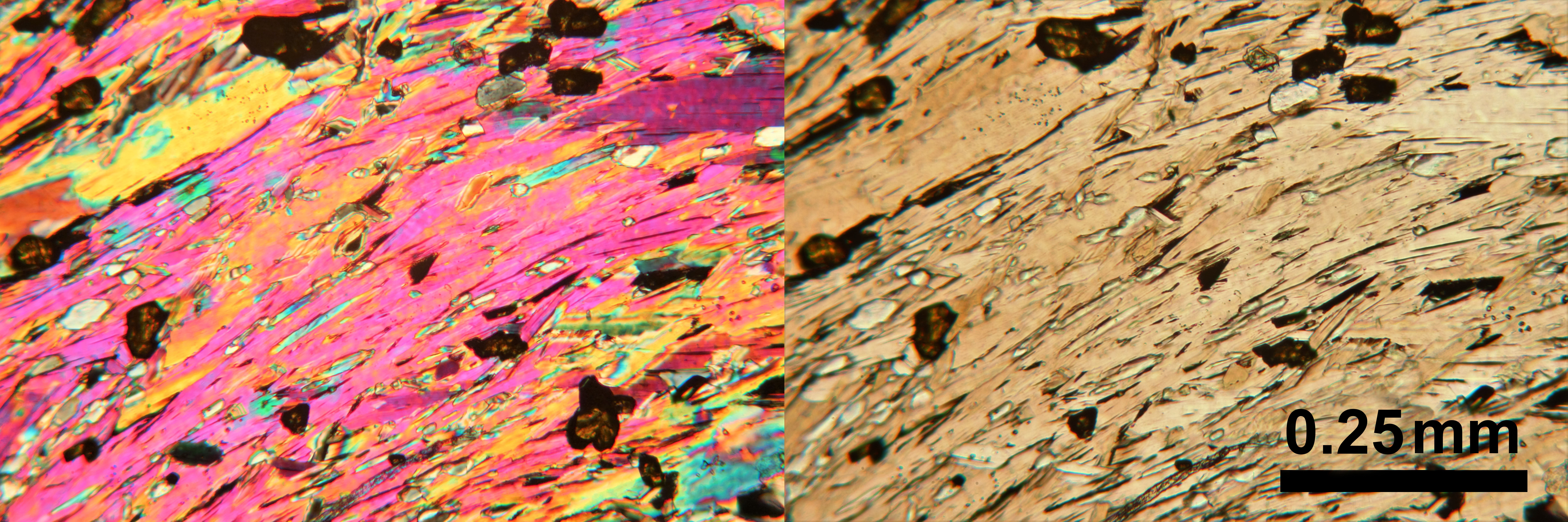
Rutile grains as accessory post-kinematic mineral in highly deformed mica-rich zone. Photomicrograph from thin section in cross- and plane-polarised light.

Magnetite is the most common accessory mineral in the ore rocks, and constitute usually less than 1 vol% of the ore. It is mostly found in the glimmerites. Sulfide minerals represented in the ore are pyrite, pyrrhotite, and lesser amounts of chalcopyrite. Sulfides can locally occur in massive form, despite their proportional rarity.

Barite, strontianite, monazite, pyrochlore, zircon, baddeleyite, rutile, and ilmenite have been identified in Siilinjärvi as rare accessory minerals. Barite can occur as intergrowths with strontianite in < 50 μm inclusions in calcite. Monazite can be found in two types: <50 μm subhedral inclusions in calcite or apatite and slightly larger sub-anhedral grains along grain boundaries. Pyrochlorite exists as inclusions mostly in phlogopite, grains are usually 50–200 μm wide. Zircon occurs as euhedral grains, which vary in size from 100 μm up to several centimeters long grains. However, zircon is an uncommon mineral in carbonates because of the low silica activity in the melt. Baddeleyite is found as inclusions in zircon.

== Geological structures ==
The dominant foliation dip direction in the Särkijärvi area is almost N-S (265-275°) and it dips nearly vertically (85-90°) toward west. The strike of the foliation is also the dominant direction of shearing. Other shearing trend is north-west to south-east, but it is weaker. This direction is also the dominating direction of the diabases.

Shearing is a common feature in the main Siilinjärvi ore body and the contact zone between the country rock and ore body. There are also contact zones which show the primary magmatic contact. Paleoproterozoic diabase dykes crosscut the sheared zone. At least two stages of deformation can be found in the Siilinjärvi complex rocks. The deformation took certainly place during the Svecofennian orogeny, but other earlier stages of deformation may have occurred.
