= Belovite group =

The belovite group is a group of phosphates in the apatite supergroup, related to fluorapatite

== Belovite group members ==
Members of the belovite group include:

- Belovite
  - Belovite-(Ce): NaCeSr_{3}(PO_{4})_{3}F
  - Belovite-(La): NaLaSr_{3}(PO_{4})_{3}F
- Carlgieseckeite-(Nd): NaNdCa_{3}(PO_{4})_{3}F
- Deloneite: (Na_{0.5}REE_{0.25}Ca_{0.25})(Ca_{0.75}REE_{0.25})Sr_{1.5}(CaNa_{0.25}REE_{0.25})(PO_{4})_{3}F_{0.5}(OH)_{0.5}
- Fluorcaphite: SrCaCa_{3}(PO_{4})_{3}F
- Fluorstrophite: SrCaSr_{3}(PO_{4})_{3}F
- Kuannersuite-(Ce): NaCeBa_{3}(PO_{4})_{3}F_{0.5}Cl_{0.5}
