= Phosphite fluoride =

Phosphite fluorides are mixed anion compounds containing phosphite and fluoride anions. They are not to be confused with phosphate fluorides or phosphide fluorides which have different numbers of oxygen atoms joined to the phosphorus.

== Structures ==
Phosphite ions have three oxygen atoms that can form complexes with metal ions. The hydrogen atom is covalently attached to the phosphorus atom and does not participate in hydrogen bonding. Compared the four bonds from phosphate, this results in lower dimensional structures, one or two dimensional rather than three-dimensional solid networks. The fluoride ion acts as a "mineralizer" stabilising different structures to the simple phosphite salt structures.

== List ==
name	formula	system	space group	unit cell	volume	density	comment	ref
ethylenediammonium	(C_{2}H_{10}N_{2})[V^{III}(HPO_{3})F_{3}]	orthorhombic	P2_{1}2_{1}2_{1}	a = 12.809 b = 9.518 c = 6.440 Z=4	785.2	2.115	green	
ethylenediammonium	(C_{2}H_{10}N_{2})[Cr^{III}(HPO_{3})F_{3}]	orthorhombic	P2_{1}2_{1}2_{1}	a = 12.801, b = 9.337 c = 6.508 Z = 4,	777.9	2.144	green	
	Mn_{2}(HPO_{3})F_{2}	orthorhombic	Pnma	a = 7.5607 b = 10.2342 c = 5.5156 Z = 4				
	H_{3.2}Mn_{3.4}[C_{6}N_{2}H_{11}]_{2}{Al_{12}(HPO_{3})_{15.0}(HPO_{4})_{3.0}F_{12}}·14H_{2}O	hexagonal	P6_{3}/m	a=13.2544 c=15.6722 Z=6	2384.41	1.864	colourless	
	Fe_{2}(HPO_{3})F_{2}	orthorhombic	Pnma	a = 7.346 b = 10.038 c = 5.495 Z = 4	405.16			
Ethylenediammonium (μ_{3}-hydrogen phosphito)-trifluoro-iron(iii)	(C_{2}N_{2}H_{10})[Fe(HPO_{3})F_{3}]	orthorhombic	P2_{1}2_{1}2_{1}	a=12.906 b=9.528 c=6.438 Z=4				
piperazin-diium	(C_{4}N_{2}H_{12})[Fe^{II}Fe^{III}(HPO_{3})_{2}F_{3}]	monoclinic	P2_{1}/n	a = 12.935 b = 6.4476 c = 15.693 β = 105.630° Z = 4	1260.4	2.196	brown	
piperazin-diium	(C_{4}N_{2}H_{12}) [Fe^{II}_{0.86}Fe^{III}_{1.14} (HPO_{3})_{1.39} (HPO_{4})_{0.47} (PO_{4})_{0.14}F_{3}]	orthorhombic	P2_{1}2_{1}2_{1}	a=12.790 b=6.440 c=15.167 Z=4	1249.3	2.25	brown	
DETA	|C_{4}N_{3}H_{14}|[Fe_{3}(HPO_{3})_{4}F_{2}(H_{2}O)_{2}]	monoclinic	C2/c	a=12.877 b=12.170 c=12.159 β=93.99 Z=4	1900.9	2.326	light pink; 3D framework with 6, 8 and 10-membered rings	
	(C_{6}N_{2}H_{16})_{0.5}[Fe^{II}(HPO_{3})F]	monoclinic	P2_{1}/c	a=5.607 b=21.276 c=11.652 β=93.74°				
	[C_{6}N_{2}H_{14}]_{2}[Fe^{III}_{2}F_{2}(HPO_{3})_{2}(C_{2}O_{4})_{2}							
N,N′-bis(2-aminoethyl)-1,3-propanediamine (C_{7}N_{4}H_{20})	(H_{4}baepn)_{0.5}[Fe^{III}_{2.3}Fe^{II}_{1.7}(H_{2}O)_{2}(HPO_{3})_{3.57}(HPO_{4})_{0.13}(PO_{4})_{0.3}F_{4}]	monoclinic	P2_{1}/c	a = 13.6808 b = 12.6340 c = 12.7830 β = 116.983° Z=4				
ethylene diamine	(C_{2}N_{2}H_{10})[Fe_{0.44}V_{0.56}(HPO_{3})F_{3}]	orthorhombic	P2_{1}2_{1}2_{1}	a = 12.8494 b = 9.5430 c = 6.4372			brown; 1-D double chains	
ethylene diamine	(C_{2}N_{2}H_{10})[Fe_{0.72}V_{0.28}(HPO_{3})F_{3}]	orthorhombic	P2_{1}2_{1}2_{1}	a = 12.8578 b = 9.5342, c = 6.4370			brown; 1-D double chains	
1,4-Diazoniobicyclo(2.2.2)octane (μ_{3}-phosphito)-fluoro-(oxalato-O,O')-iron(iii) monohydrate	[C_{6}N_{2}H_{14}]_{2}[Fe^{III}_{2}F_{2}(HPO_{3})_{2}(C_{2}O_{4})_{2}]·2 H_{2}O	monoclinic	P2_{1}/n	a=12.511 b=6.3728 c=33.153 β=90.953° Z=4	2643.0	1.875	brown	
	(C_{6}N_{2}H_{16})_{0.5}[Co^{II}(HPO_{3})F]	monoclinic	P2_{1}/c	a=5.5822 b=21.325 c=11.4910 β=93.464°				
N,N′-bis(2-aminoethyl)-1,3-propanediamine (C_{7}N_{4}H_{20})	(H_{4}baepn)_{0.5}[Fe^{III}_{2.0}Fe^{II}_{0.71}Co^{II}_{1.29}(H_{2}O)_{2}(HPO_{3})_{3.63}(HPO_{4})_{0}_{.38}F_{4}]	monoclinic	P2_{1}/c	a = 13.6823 b = 12.6063 c = 12.7535 β = 116.988° Z = 4.				
N,N′-bis(2-aminoethyl)-1,3-propanediamine (C_{7}N_{4}H_{20})	(H_{4}baepn)_{0.5}[Fe^{III}_{2.0}Fe^{II}_{0.62}Co^{II}_{1.38}(H_{2}O)_{2}(HPO_{3})_{3.62}(HPO_{4})_{0.38}F_{4}]							
3-picoline	Hpic·Ga_{2}(HPO_{3})_{3}F(H_{2}O)·2H_{2}O	monoclinic	P2_{1}/c	a = 11.3213 b = 15.8208 c = 9.6156 β = 104.485° Z = 4	1667.53	2.177	proton conductor	
diethylenetriamine	(H_{3}DETA)Ga_{3}(HPO_{3})_{4}F_{4}	monoclinic	C2/c	a=12.741 b=12.068 c=11.988 β=94.902^{o} Z=4	1836.6			
bis(piperazine-1,4-diium) tetrakis(μ_{3}-phosphito)-bis(μ_{2}-fluoro)-bis(μ_{2}-hydrogen phosphito)-tetrafluoro-tetra-gallium	(C_{4}N_{2}H_{12})[Ga_{2}F_{3}(HPO_{3})_{2}(H_{2}PO_{3})]	triclinic	P1̅	a=7.1072 b=9.4094 c=11.7847 α=71.602° β=78.165° γ=70.296°				
(ethan-1,2-diammonium) (μ3-hydrogen phosphito)-trifluorogallium(III)	(C_{2}H_{10}N_{2})[GaF_{3}(HPO_{3})]	orthorhombic	P2_{1}2_{1}2_{1}	a = 6.358 b = 9.423 c = 12.968 Z = 4	777.0			
ethylene diamine	(C_{2}N_{2}H_{10})[Ga_{0.98}Cr_{0.02}(HPO_{3})F_{3}]	orthorhombic	P2_{1}2_{1}2_{1}	a=12.9417 b=9.4027 c=6.3502 Z=4.				
2,2′-bipyridine	Ga_{3}F_{2}(2,2′-bipy)_{2}(HPO_{3})_{2}(H_{1.5}PO_{3})_{2}	monoclinic	C2/c	a=17.633 b=9.883 c=16.793 β=109.88° Z=4	2752.1			
1,2-diaminocyclohexane (DACH)	Ga(HPO_{3})F_{3}·(trans-C_{6}N_{2}H_{16})	monoclinic	P2_{1}/c	a = 11.2635 b = 9.8212 c = 10.1458 β = 102.981° Z = 4				
2-methyl piperazine	Ga(HPO_{3})F_{2}·(H_{2}C_{5}N_{2}H_{12})_{0.5}	trigonal	R3̅	a = 18.315 c = 13.136 Z = 9	3815.9			
N,N′-dimethyl piperazine	Ga(HPO_{3})F_{2}·(H_{2}C_{6}N_{2}H_{14})_{0.5}	trigonal	R3̅	a=17.8476 c = 13.5159 Z = 18	3728.5			
hexakis(4-(dimethylamino)pyridinium) hexakis(μ-hydrogen phosphonato)-hexakis(μ-phosphonato)-hexakis(μ-fluoro)-hexa-gallium	(C_{7}H_{11}N_{2})6(HPO_{3})6(H_{2}PO_{3})_{6}F_{6}Ga_{6}	triclinic	P1̅	a 9.9573(7)Å b 10.8486(6)Å c 19.2188(11)Å, α 93.803(5)° β 96.919(5)° γ 109.024(6)°				
(μ-fluoro)-(μ-phosphonato)-(4-(dimethylamino)pyridine)-gallium	(C_{7}H_{11}N_{2})(HPO_{3})FGa	trigonal	R3̅	a=13.5471 c=32.687				
tris(4-(dimethylamino)pyridinium) oxonium tris(μ-hydroxo)-tetradecakis(μ-phosphonato)-hexa-aqua-nona-gallium	(C_{7}H_{11}N_{2})_{3}(HPO_{3})_{14}(H_{3}O)(OH)_{3}Ga_{9}(H_{2}O)_{6}	trigonal	P3̅_{1}c	a=13.282 c=22.59				
Propane-1,2-diaminium (μ_{3}-hydrogen phosphito)-(μ_{2}-hydrogen phosphito)-fluoro-indium	[C_{3}H_{12}N_{2}][InF(HPO_{3})_{2}]	triclinic	P1̅	a=5.412 b=10.234 c=10.511 α=113.234° β=95.522° γ=92.534°			1D chain	
	SbHPO_{3}F	monoclinic	P2_{1}/c	a=4.5655 b=13.1125 c=6.7048 β=98.650° Z=4	396.82	3.695		
