= Last Interglacial =

Interglacial period which began 130,000 years ago

Two ice core temperature records; the Last Interglacial is at a depth of about 1500–1800 meters in the lower graph

CO_{2} concentrations over the last 800,000 years as measured from ice cores

The Last Interglacial was the interglacial period that began about 130,000 years ago at the end of the Penultimate Glacial Period, and ended about 115,000 years ago at the beginning of the Last Glacial Period. It corresponds to Marine Isotope Stage 5e. It was the second-to-latest interglacial of the current Ice Age, the most recent being the Holocene which extends to the present day (having followed the Last Glacial Period). During the Last Interglacial, the proportion of CO_{2} in the atmosphere was about 280 parts per million. The Last Interglacial was one of the warmest periods of the last 800,000 years, with temperatures comparable to and at times warmer (by up to on average 2 degrees Celsius) than the contemporary Holocene interglacial, with the maximum sea level being up to 6 to 9 metres higher than at present, with global ice volume likely also being smaller than the Holocene interglacial.

The Last Interglacial is known as the Eemian in northern Europe (sometimes used to describe the global interglacial), Ipswichian in Britain, the Mikulino (also spelled Milukin) interglacial in Russia, the Kaydaky in Ukraine, the Valdivia interglacial in Chile, and the Riss-Würm interglacial in the Alps. Depending on how a specific publication defines the Sangamonian of North America, the Last Interglacial is equivalent to either all or part of it.

The period falls into the Middle Paleolithic and is of some interest for the evolution of early modern humans, who were present in West Asia (the Skhul and Qafzeh hominins) as well as in Southern Africa by this time, representing the earliest split of modern human populations that persists to the present time (associated with mitochondrial haplogroup L0). As the most recent point in time with a climate comparable to the Holocene, the Last Interglacial is also of relevance as a point of reference (baseline) for nature conservation.

== Definition ==
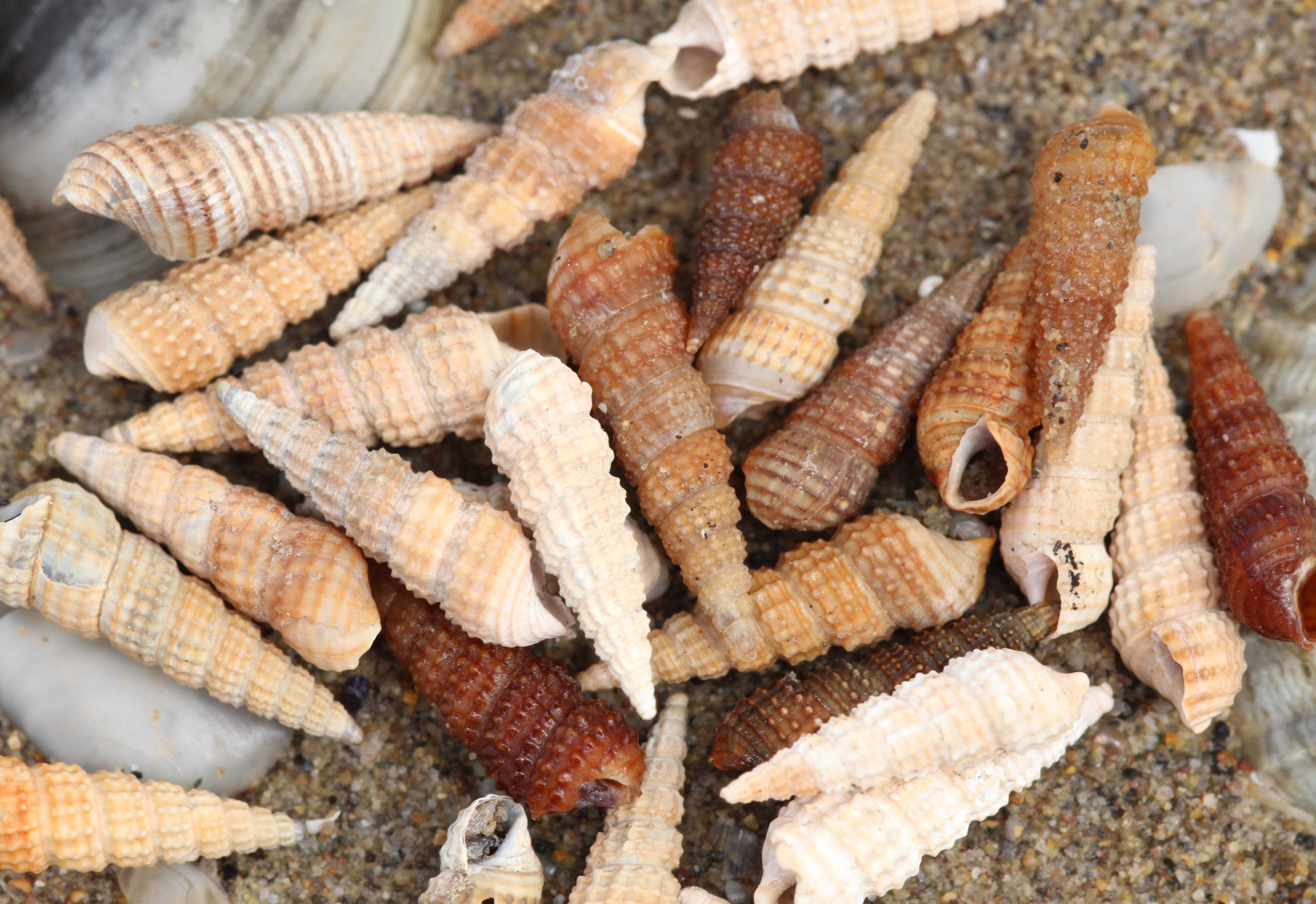
Pieter Harting (1886) assigned Bittium reticulatum as the index fossil for the Last Interglacial.

The Last Interglacial was first recognized from boreholes in the area of the city of Amersfoort, Netherlands, by Pieter Harting (1875). He named the beds "Système Eémien", after the river Eem on which Amersfoort is located. Harting noticed the marine molluscan assemblages to be very different from the modern fauna of the North Sea. Many species from the Last Interglacial layers nowadays show a much more southern distribution, ranging from South of the Strait of Dover to Portugal (Lusitanian faunal province) and even into the Mediterranean (Mediterranean faunal province). More information on the molluscan assemblages is given by Lorié (1887), and Spaink (1958). Since their discovery, Last Interglacial beds in the Netherlands have mainly been recognized by their marine molluscan content combined with their stratigraphical position and other palaeontology. The marine beds there are often underlain by tills that are considered to date from the Saale glaciation and overlain by local fresh water or wind-blown deposits from the Weichselian glaciation. In contrast to, for example, deposits in Denmark, the Last Interglacial deposits in the type area have never been found overlain by tills, nor in ice-pushed positions.

Van Voorthuysen (1958) described the foraminifera from the type site, whereas Zagwijn (1961) published the palynology, providing a subdivision of this stage into pollen stages. At the end of the 20th century, the type site was re-investigated using old and new data in a multi-disciplinary approach (Cleveringa et al., 2000). At the same time, a parastratotype was selected in the Amsterdam glacial basin in the Amsterdam-Terminal borehole and was the subject of a multidisciplinary investigation (Van Leeuwen et al., 2000). These authors also published a U/Th age for late Last Interglacial deposits from this borehole of 118,200 ± 6,300 years ago. A historical review of Dutch Last Interglacial research is provided by Bosch, Cleveringa and Meijer, 2000.

== Climate ==
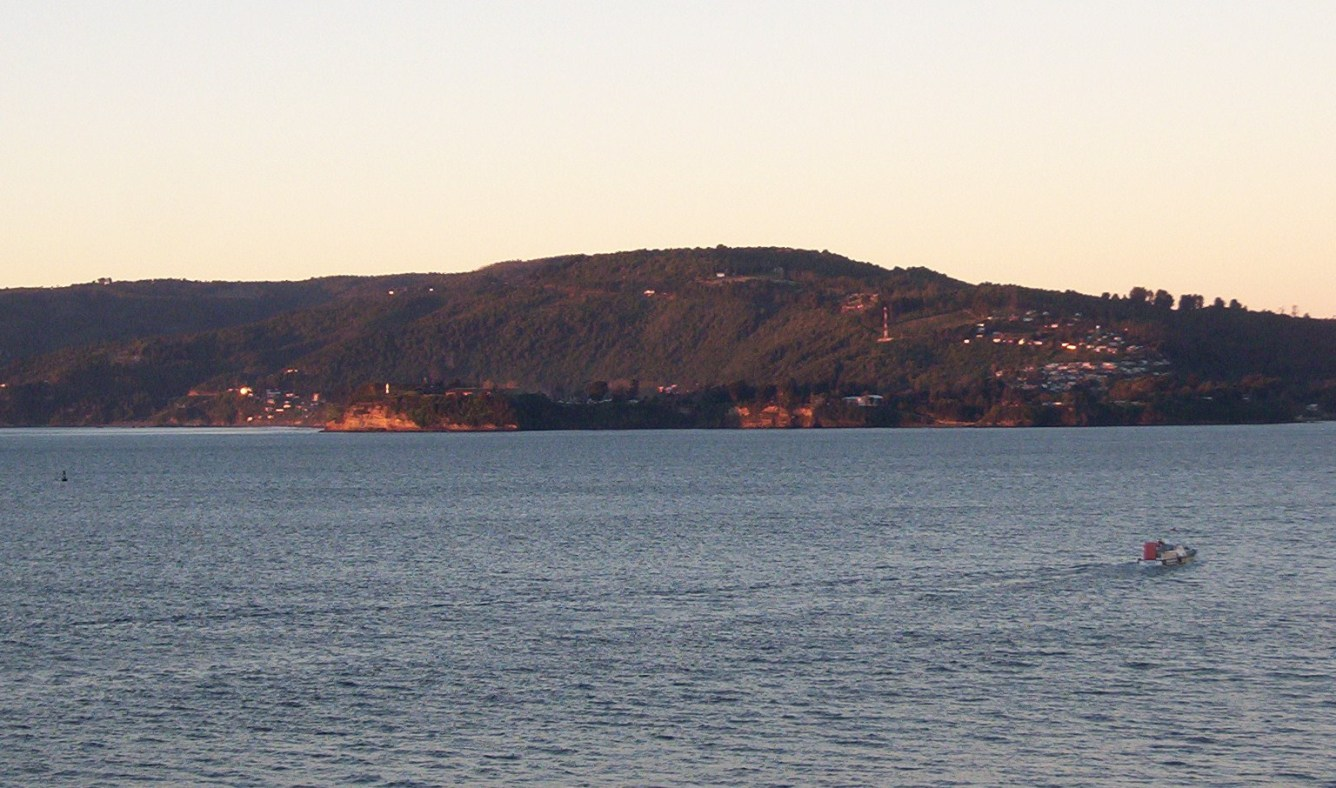
View of the Last Interglacial–aged coastal terraces of Niebla near Valdivia, Chile.

=== Global temperatures ===
The Last Interglacial climate is believed to have been warmer than the current Holocene. The temperature of the Last Interglacial peaked during the early part of the period, around 128,000 to 123,000 years Before Present, before declining during the latter half of the period. Changes in the Earth's orbital parameters from today (greater obliquity and eccentricity, and perihelion), known as Milankovitch cycles, probably led to greater seasonal temperature variations in the Northern Hemisphere. As the Last Interglacial cooled, pCO_{2} remained stable.

During the northern summer, temperatures in the Arctic region were about 2–4 °C higher than in 2011. The Arctic Last Interglacial climate was highly unstable, with pronounced temperature swings revealed by δ^{18}O fluctuations in Greenlandic ice cores, though some of the instability inferred from Greenland ice core project records may be a result of mixing of Last Interglacial ice with ice from the preceding or succeeding glacial intervals.

The warmest peak of the Last Interglacial was around 125,000 years ago, when forests reached as far north as North Cape, Norway (which is now tundra) well above the Arctic Circle at 71°10′21″N 25°47′40″E. Hardwood trees such as hazel and oak grew as far north as Oulu, Finland. At the peak of the Last Interglacial, the Northern Hemisphere winters were generally warmer and wetter than now, though some areas were actually slightly cooler than today. A cooling event similar to but not exactly mirroring the 8.2-kiloyear event is recorded from Beckentin during the E5 phase of the Eemian, some 6,290 years after the start of interglacial afforestation. A 2018 study based on soil samples from Sokli in northern Finland identified abrupt cold spells ca. 120,000 years ago caused by shifts in the North Atlantic Current, lasting hundreds of years and causing temperature drops of a few degrees and vegetation changes in these regions. In Northern Europe, winter temperatures rose over the course of the Last Interglacial while summer temperatures fell. During an insolation maximum from 133,000 to 130,000 BP, meltwater from the Dnieper and Volga caused the Black and Caspian Seas to connect. During the middle of the Last Interglacial, a weakened Atlantic Meridional Overturning Circulation (AMOC) began to cool the eastern Mediterranean region. The period closed as temperatures steadily fell to conditions cooler and drier than the present, with a 468-year-long aridity pulse in central Europe at about 116,000 BC, and by 112,000 BC, ice caps began to form in southern Norway, marking the start of a new glacial period. The Eemian lasted about 1,500 to 3,000 years longer in Southern Europe than in Northern Europe. Kaspar et al. (GRL, 2005) performed a comparison of a coupled general circulation model (GCM) with reconstructed Last Interglacial temperatures for Europe. Central Europe (north of the Alps) was found to be 1–2 °C (1.8–3.6 °F) warmer than present; south of the Alps, conditions were 1–2 °C cooler than today. The model (generated using observed greenhouse gas concentrations and Last Interglacial orbital parameters) generally reproduces these observations, leading them to conclude that these factors are enough to explain the Last Interglacial temperatures. δ^{18}O_{CO3} measurements from equid teeth at Neumark-Nord 2 in Germany suggest that European summers were about 5 °C warmer than present.

Meltwater pulse 2B, approximately 133,000 BP, substantially weakened the Indian Summer Monsoon (ISM).

Trees grew as far north as southern Baffin Island in the Canadian Arctic Archipelago: currently, the northern limit is further south at Kuujjuaq in northern Quebec. Coastal Alaska was warm enough during the summer due to reduced sea ice in the Arctic Ocean to allow Saint Lawrence Island (now tundra) to have boreal forest, although inadequate precipitation caused a reduction in the forest cover in interior Alaska and Yukon Territory despite warmer conditions. The prairie-forest boundary in the Great Plains of the United States lay further west near Lubbock, Texas, whereas the current boundary is near Dallas.

Interglacial conditions ended on Antarctica while the Northern Hemisphere was still experiencing warmth.

== Sea level ==
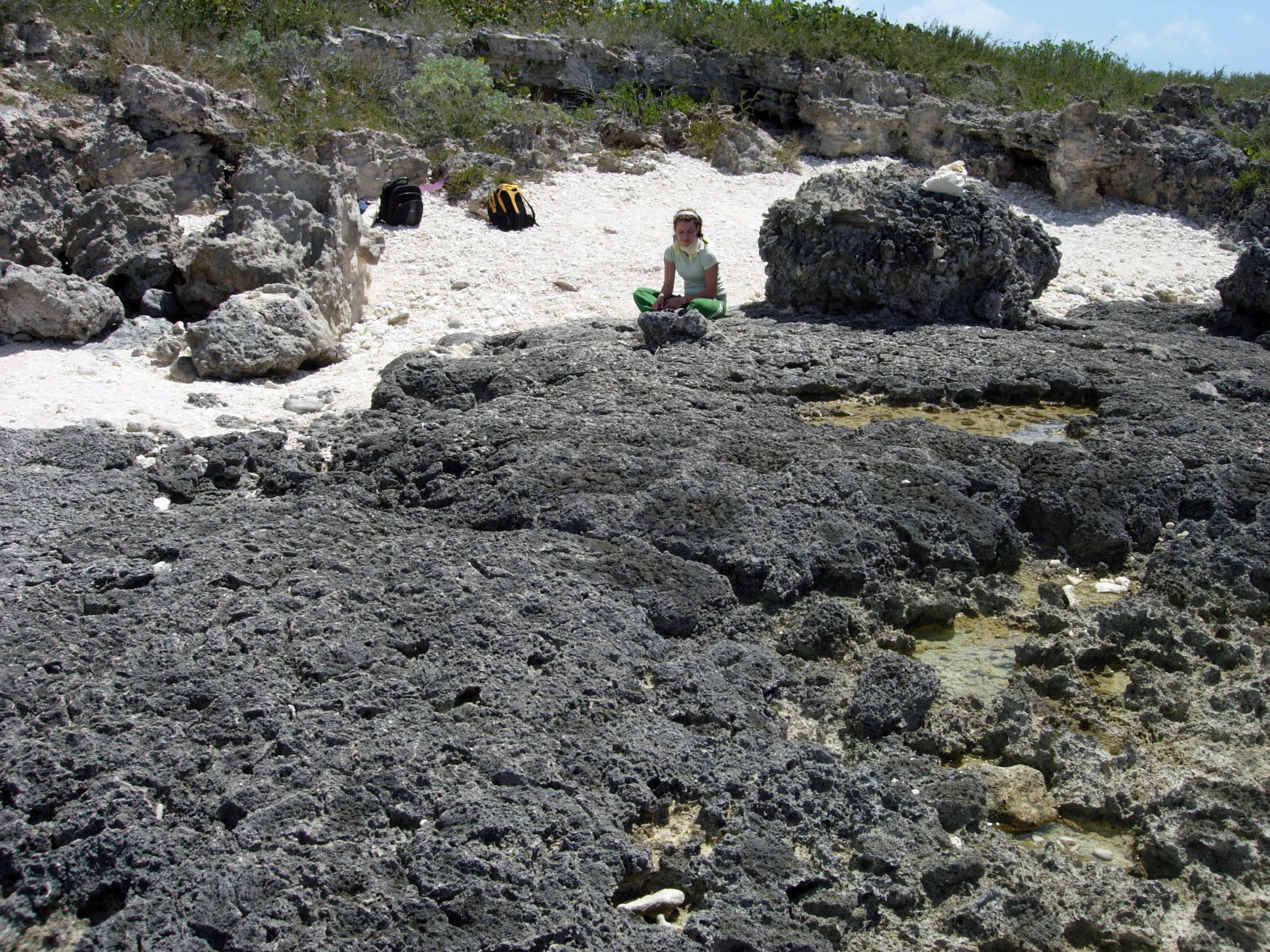
Last Interglacial erosion surface in a fossil coral reef on Great Inagua, The Bahamas. Foreground shows corals truncated by erosion; behind the geologist is a post-erosion coral pillar which grew on the surface after sea level rose again.

Sea level at peak was probably 6 to 9 metres (20 to 30 feet) higher than today, with Greenland contributing 0.6 to 3.5 m (2.0 to 11.5 ft), thermal expansion and mountain glaciers contributing up to 1 m (3.3 ft), and an uncertain contribution from Antarctica. A 2007 study found evidence that the Greenland ice core site Dye 3 was glaciated during the Last Interglacial, which implies that Greenland could have contributed at most 2 m (6.6 ft) to sea level rise. Recent research on marine sediment cores offshore of the West Antarctic Ice Sheet suggest that the sheet melted during the Last Interglacial, and that ocean waters rose as fast as 2.5 meters per century. Global mean sea surface temperatures are thought to have been higher than in the Holocene, but not by enough to explain the rise in sea level through thermal expansion alone, and so melting of polar ice caps must also have occurred.

Because of the sea level drop since the Last Interglacial, exposed fossil coral reefs are common in the tropics, especially in the Caribbean and along the Red Sea coastlines. These reefs often contain internal erosion surfaces showing significant sea level instability during the Last Interglacial.

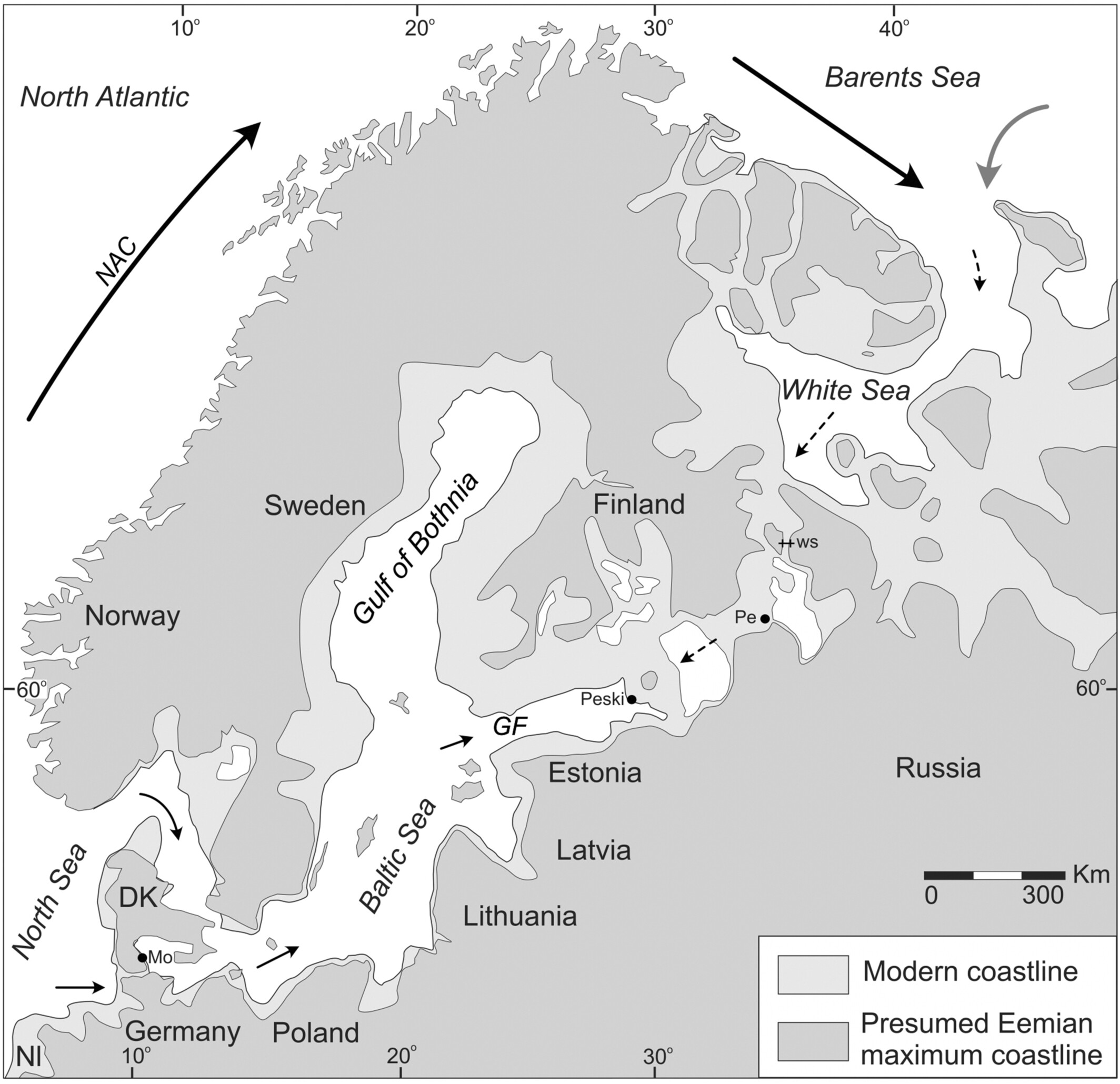
Map of the Baltic and White seas during the Last Interglacial, showing difference between modern and Last Interglacial coastlines in light grey, including passageway between the White Sea and Baltic Sea

Along the Central Mediterranean Spanish coast, sea levels were comparable to those of the present. Due to high sea levels, Fennoscandia formed an island during the Last Interglacial because of a seaway passage existing between the Gulf of Finland of the Baltic Sea and the White Sea of Russia, resulting in the Baltic Sea (sometimes referred to as the Eemian Sea during this time period) having a much higher salinity (salt content) than today, with the coastline of the Baltic Sea also being considerably further inland relative to today's coastlines, with Jutland also forming an island. Vast areas of northwestern Europe and the West Siberian Plain were also inundated.

== Fauna ==
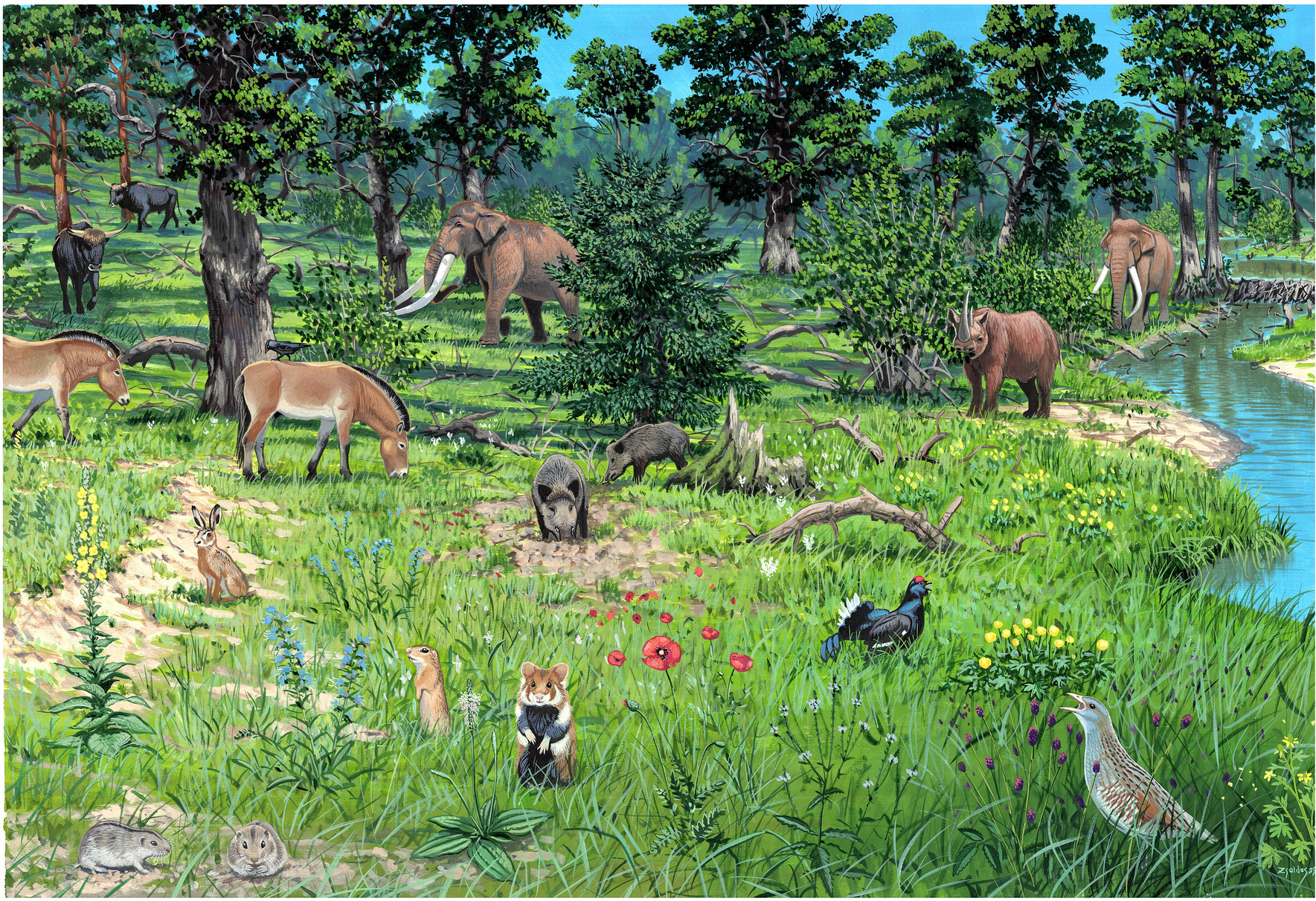
Landscape of Central Europe during the Last Interglacial featuring large herbivorous animals including straight-tusked elephant, Merck's rhinoceros, wild boar, wild horse and aurochs. Other featured animals include western jackdaw, corn crake, black grouse, steppe lemming, the extinct ground squirrel Spermophilus citelloides, European hare and European hamster

The warmness of the interval allowed temperate-adapted taxa to extend their range considerably northward, with the range of the hippopotamus (Hippopotamus amphibius) notably extending as far north as Stockton-on-Tees in northern England, though their range outside of southern Europe did not extend much further east than the Rhine. The temperate landscapes of Europe were inhabited by large now extinct megafauna including the straight-tusked elephant (Palaeoloxodon antiquus), the narrow-nosed rhinoceros (Stephanorhinus hemitoechus), Merck's rhinoceros (Stephanorhinus kirchbergensis), Irish elk (Megaloceros giganteus) and aurochs (Bos primigenius), alongside still-living species like red deer (Cervus elaphus), fallow deer (Dama dama), roe deer (Capreolus capreolus) and wild boar (Sus scrofa), with predators including lions (the extinct Panthera spelaea) and cave hyenas (Crocuta (Crocuta) spelaea), brown bears (Ursus arctos) and wolves (Canis lupus). The Last Interglacial ecosystems of Europe, which existed prior to the global wave of megafauna extinctions that occurred during the following Last Glacial Period, has been suggested as a "baseline" reference point for the analysis and restoration of modern European ecosystems.

Due to having higher water temperatures than today, the Mediterranean Sea was colonised during the Last Interglacial by now exotic species of marine invertebrates of the "Senegalese Fauna", such as the conch Thetystrombus latus, the cone snail Conus ermineus and the sea snail Linatella caudata, currently only found much further south in the tropical waters of the Atlantic, including off the coast of West Africa.

Following the melting of the Laurentide Ice Sheet, a number of North American megafauna species migrated northwards to inhabit northern Canada and Alaska during the Last Interglacial, including the American camel Camelops hesternus, mastodons (genus Mammut) the large ground sloth Megalonyx jeffersonii, and the bear sized giant beaver Castoroides, with the lower latitudes of Canada being inhabited (in addition to the aforementioned taxa) by species like Columbian mammoth (Mammuthus columbi), stag-moose (Cervalces), and the llama Hemiauchenia. The steppe bison (Bison priscus) migrated into the heartlands of North America from Alaska at the beginning of the Last Interglacial, giving rise to the giant long-horned bison Bison latifrons (which is first known from the Snowmass site in Colorado, dating to around 120,000 years ago) and ultimately all North American bison species, and marking the beginning of the Rancholabrean faunal age in North America. Also during this time period the American lion (Panthera atrox) appeared and become widespread across North America, having descended from populations of the Eurasian cave lion (Panthera spelaea) that had migrated into Alaska during the preceding Penultimate Glacial Period.

The range of cold-adapted taxa like the woolly mammoth (Mammuthus primigenius) contracted towards refugia, in the case of the woolly mammoth likely the far north of Siberia. Genetic analysis indicates that the population of woolly rhinoceros substantially declined during this period, though suitable habitat remained in the Altai and Russian Far East, and there is some evidence woolly rhinoceroses inhabited habitats considerably warmer than they are typically associated with during the Last Interglacial, such as at the Neumark-Nord locality in central Germany, where it occurs alongside temperate-adapted fauna.

== Paleoanthropology ==
Neanderthals managed to colonise the higher latitudes of Europe during this time interval, after having retreated from the region due to unfavourable conditions during the Penultimate Glacial Period. However, unlike previous interglacials, they were absent from Britain, likely due to Britain being an island during this time. During the Last Interglacial, Neanderthals engaged in a variety of food-gathering activities, including fishing, as well as big-game hunting, including the largest animals living in Europe at the time, straight-tusked elephants. Modern humans were present outside Africa in Arabia during this interval, as far east as the Persian Gulf.

== See also ==
- Marine Isotope Stage 5
- Paleoclimatology
- Timeline of glaciation
