= Thulium phosphate =

Names
- Other names Thulium orthophosphate

Identifiers
CAS Number	15883-44-0
3D model (JSmol)	Interactive image
ChemSpider	13658171
EC Number	240-018-8
PubChem CID	22118043
CompTox Dashboard (EPA)	DTXSID20166531
- InChI: InChI=1S/H3O4P.Tm/c1-5(2,3)4;/h(H3,1,2,3,4);/q;+3/p-3 Key: OKBGNVIROKPBTK-UHFFFAOYSA-K
- SMILES: [O-]P(=O)([O-])[O-].[Tm+3]

Properties
Chemical formula	TmPO_{4}
Molar mass	263.90 g/mol
Appearance	Solid
Solubility in water	Very slightly soluble in water

Structure
Crystal structure	Tetragonal, xenotime type
Space group	I4_{1}/amd, No. 141
- Except where otherwise noted, data are given for materials in their standard state (at 25 °C [77 °F], 100 kPa). Infobox references

Thulium phosphate is an inorganic compound of thulium and phosphate with the chemical formula TmPO_{4}. Hydrated forms are also known.

== Structure and properties ==
Anhydrous thulium phosphate crystallizes in the tetragonal crystal system with the xenotime structure, which is closely related to the zircon structure. It belongs to space group I4_{1}/amd (No. 141).

The structure consists of isolated PO_{4} tetrahedra and eight-coordinate Tm^{3+} ions. Single-crystal X-ray diffraction and first-principles calculations have been used to study its compression, elastic properties and structural stability. TmPO_{4} is more resistant to volume compression than to shear deformation, and its elastic anisotropy increases under pressure.

TmPO_{4} is also a Van Vleck paramagnet. Its magnetic behaviour is dominated by the crystal field splitting of the Tm^{3+} 4f levels, and high-field measurements show a field-induced crossover near 30 T at low temperature.

Crystal-field excitations in TmPO_{4} have also been studied by inelastic neutron scattering.

== Preparation ==
Hydrated thulium phosphate can be prepared by precipitation from aqueous solutions of thulium(III) chloride and sodium phosphate. A dihydrate has been reported, which can be converted to anhydrous TmPO_{4} by heating.

Single crystals of anhydrous TmPO_{4} can also be grown from a melt containing thulium(III) oxide, ammonium dihydrogen phosphate, lead(II) oxide and phosphorus pentoxide.

== Reactions ==
Thulium phosphate reacts with sodium fluoride under suitable solid-state conditions to form the fluoride phosphate Na_{3}Tm_{2}F_{3}PO_{4}.
