= Glimmerite =

Igneous rock

- Igneous rock
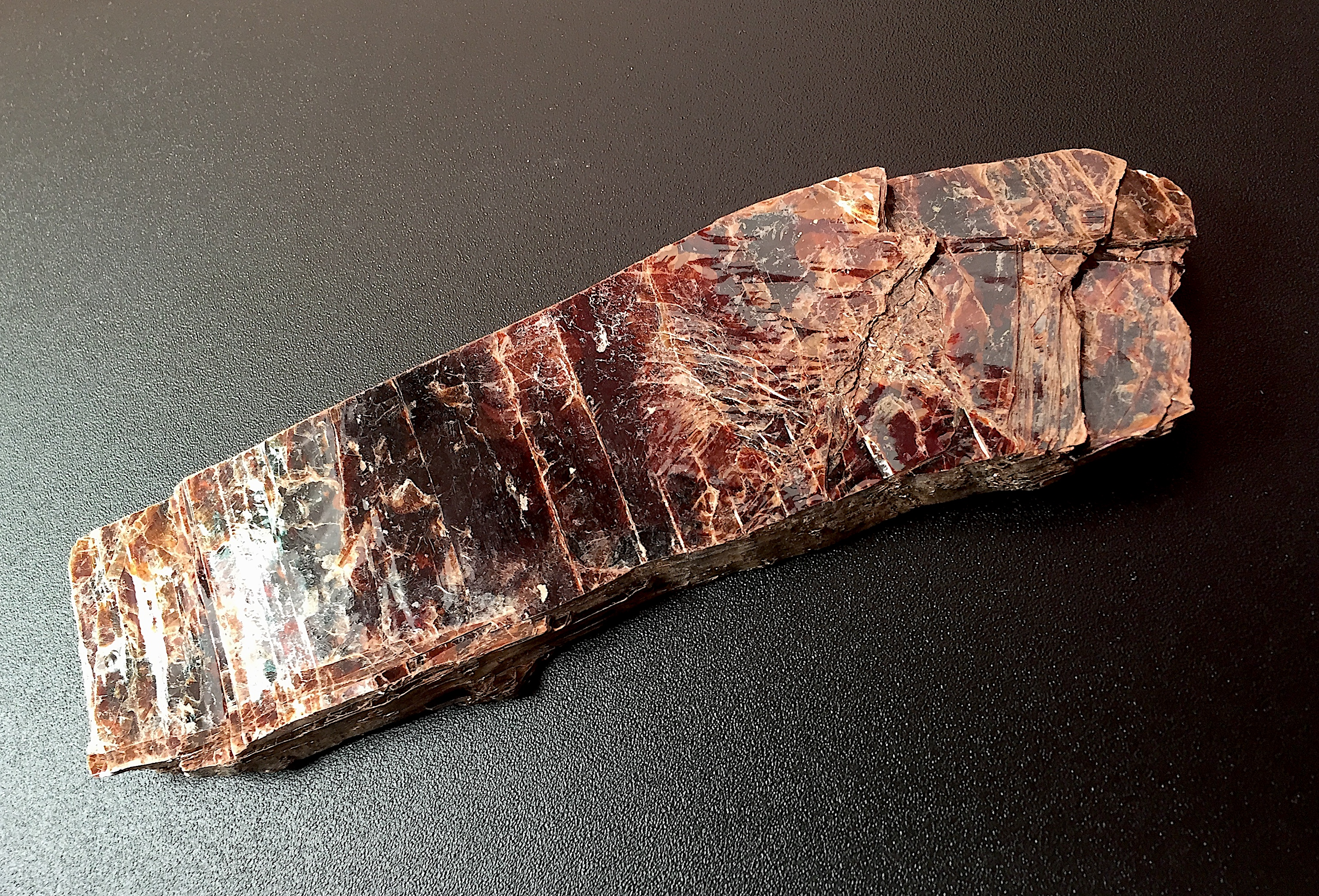
- Glimmerite from Namibia.

Composition
- Biotite or phlogopite

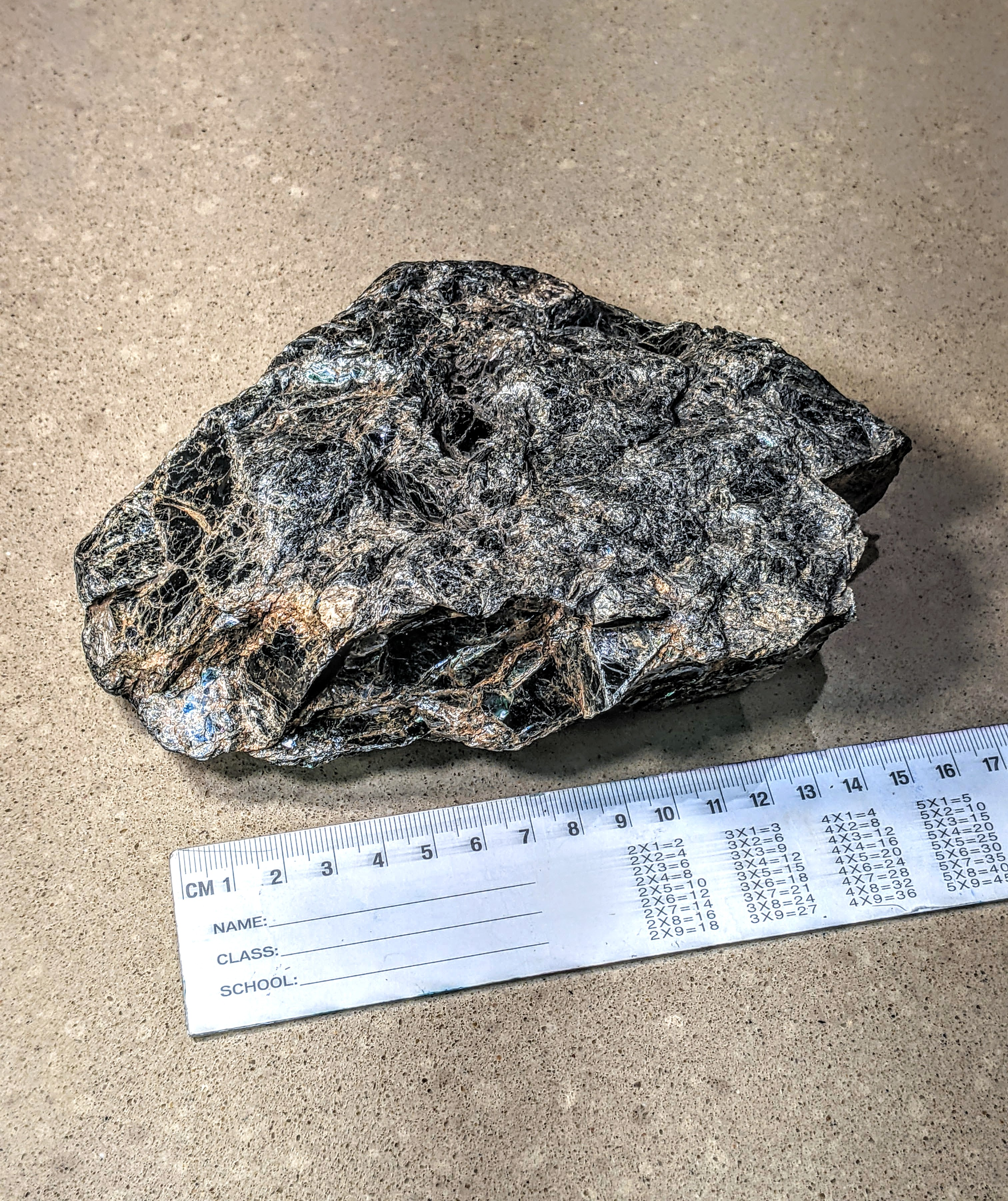
Glimmerite (biotite - annite w/magnetite), Newark, DE, pegmatite /schist contact zone

Glimmerite is an igneous rock consisting almost entirely of dark mica (biotite or phlogopite). Glimmerite has also been referred to as biotitite, though the use of this term to describe phlogopite-rich rocks has been criticized. Glimmerite may contain minor rutile and ilmenite, and variants of glimmerite bearing graphite, spinel, ankerite, pyrite, apatite, and the carbonate minerals calcite and dolomite have been described.

Glimmerite was first described by Larsen and Pardee (1929).
