= Fluorophosphate =

A fluorophosphate is one of several classes of ions or salts containing phosphorus in the +5 oxidation state and fluorine. Without the numerical prefix, monofluorophosphate is the most likely use.

- Monofluorophosphate PO_{3}F^{2−}
- Difluorophosphate PO_{2}F^{−}_{2}
- Hexafluorophosphate PF^{−}_{6}
