= Belovite-(Ce) =

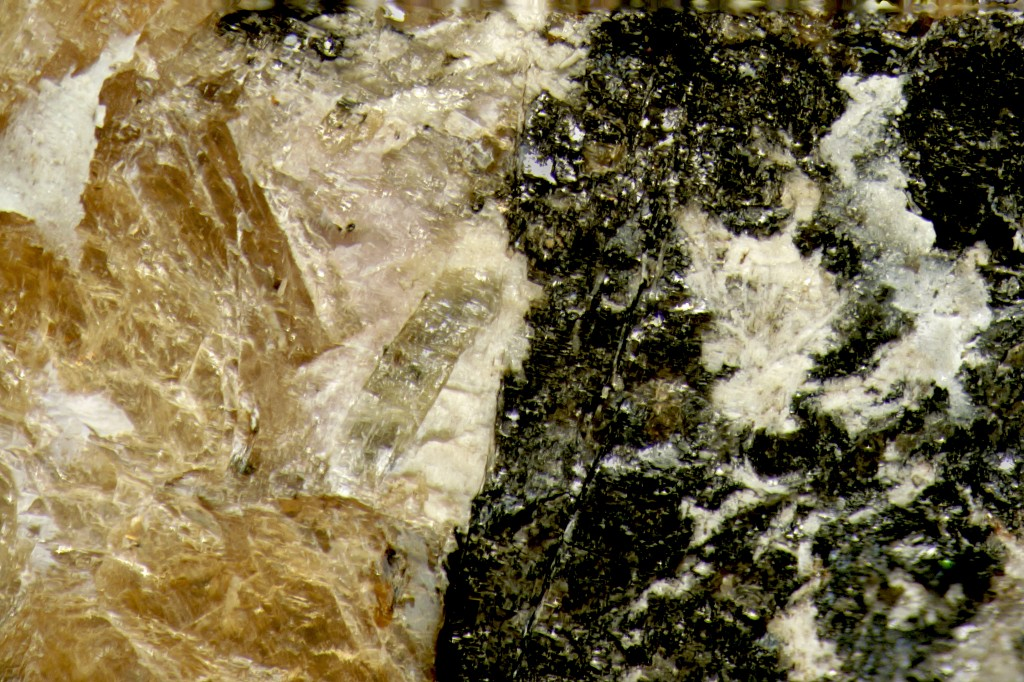

General
- Category: Phosphate mineral
- Formula: (NaCeSr_{3}(PO_{4})_{3}F)
- IMA symbol: Blv-Ce
- Strunz classification: 8.BN.05
- Dana classification: 41.8.1.6
- Crystal system: Trigonal

Identification
- Color: Honey-yellow, greenish yellow
- Fracture: Irregular
- Tenacity: Brittle
- Mohs scale hardness: 5
- Luster: Sub-vitreous, resinous, greasy
- Streak: White
- Specific gravity: 4.19

Belovite-(Ce) (NaCeSr_{3}(PO_{4})_{3}F) is the cerium analogue of belovite-(La). It is a member in the belovite group being a subgroup of the apatite group.

Belovite-(Ce) was first described in 1954 and named for Nikolai Belov. Its type locality is Malyi Punkaruaiv mountain in Lovozersky District, Russia.
