= Belovite-(La) =

General
- Category: Phosphate mineral
- Formula: (NaLaSr_{3}(PO_{4})_{3}F)
- IMA symbol: Blv-La
- Strunz classification: 8.BN.05
- Crystal system: Trigonal

Identification
- Color: Honey-yellow, greenish yellow
- Fracture: Irregular
- Tenacity: Brittle
- Mohs scale hardness: 5
- Luster: Sub-vitreous, resinous, greasy
- Streak: White
- Specific gravity: 4.19

Belovite-(La) (NaLaSr_{3}(PO_{4})_{3}F) is the lanthanum analogue of belovite-(Ce). It is a member in the belovite group being a subgroup of the apatite group.

Belovite-(La) was first described in 1996, it inherited the name belovite. and named for Nikolai Belov. Two type localities are given in the Khibiny Mountains in Murmansk Oblast, Russia.
