= Fluorapatite =

Phosphate mineral

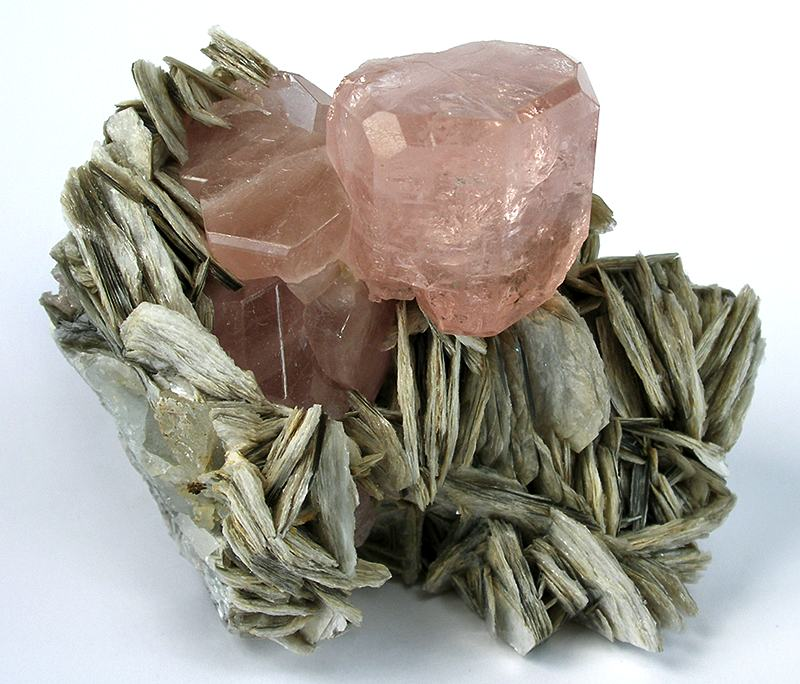
- Fluorapatite (pink) on top of muscovite (green)

General
- Category: Phosphate mineral Apatite group
- Formula: Ca_{5}(PO_{4})_{3}F
- IMA symbol: Fap
- Strunz classification: 8.BN.05
- Crystal system: Hexagonal
- Crystal class: Dipyramidal (6/m); H-M symbol: (6/m)
- Space group: P6_{3}/m

Identification
- Color: Sea-green, violet, purple, blue, pink, yellow, brown, white, colorless, may be zoned
- Crystal habit: Massive to prismatic crystalline
- Twinning: Contact twins rare
- Cleavage: Indistinct
- Fracture: Brittle to conchoidal
- Mohs scale hardness: 5
- Luster: Vitreous, resinous to dull
- Streak: White
- Diaphaneity: Transparent to opaque
- Specific gravity: 3.1 to 3.2
- Optical properties: Uniaxial (−)
- Refractive index: nω = 1.631 – 1.650 nε = 1.633 – 1.646
- Birefringence: δ = 0.002
- Ultraviolet fluorescence: Fluorescent and phosphorescent

Fluorapatite, often with the alternate spelling of fluoroapatite, is a phosphate mineral with the formula Ca_{5}(PO_{4})_{3}F (calcium fluorophosphate). Fluorapatite is a hard crystalline solid. Although samples can have various colors (green, brown, blue, yellow, violet, or colorless), the pure mineral is colorless, as expected for a material lacking transition metals. Along with hydroxyapatite, it can be a component of tooth enamel, especially in individuals who use fluoridated toothpaste, but for industrial use both minerals are mined in the form of phosphate rock, whose usual mineral composition is primarily fluorapatite but often with significant amounts of the other.

Fluorapatite crystallizes in a hexagonal crystal system. It is often combined as a solid solution with hydroxyapatite (Ca_{5}(PO_{4})_{3}OH or Ca_{10}(PO_{4})_{6}(OH)_{2}) in biological matrices. Chlorapatite (Ca_{5}(PO_{4})_{3}Cl) is another related structure. Industrially, the mineral is an important source of both phosphoric and hydrofluoric acids.

Fluorapatite as a mineral is the most common phosphate mineral. It occurs widely as an accessory mineral in igneous rocks and in calcium rich metamorphic rocks. It commonly occurs as a detrital or diagenic mineral in sedimentary rocks and is an essential component of phosphorite ore deposits. It occurs as a residual mineral in lateritic soils.

Effect of fluoridation on hydroxyapatite in tooth enamel

Fluorapatite is found in the teeth of sharks and other fishes in varying concentrations. It is also present in human teeth that have been exposed to fluoride ions, for example, through water fluoridation or by using fluoride-containing toothpaste. The presence of fluorapatite helps prevent tooth decay or dental caries. Fluoroapatite has a mild bacteriostatic property as well, which helps decrease the proliferation of Streptococcus mutans, the predominant bacterium related to dental caries.

== Synthesis ==
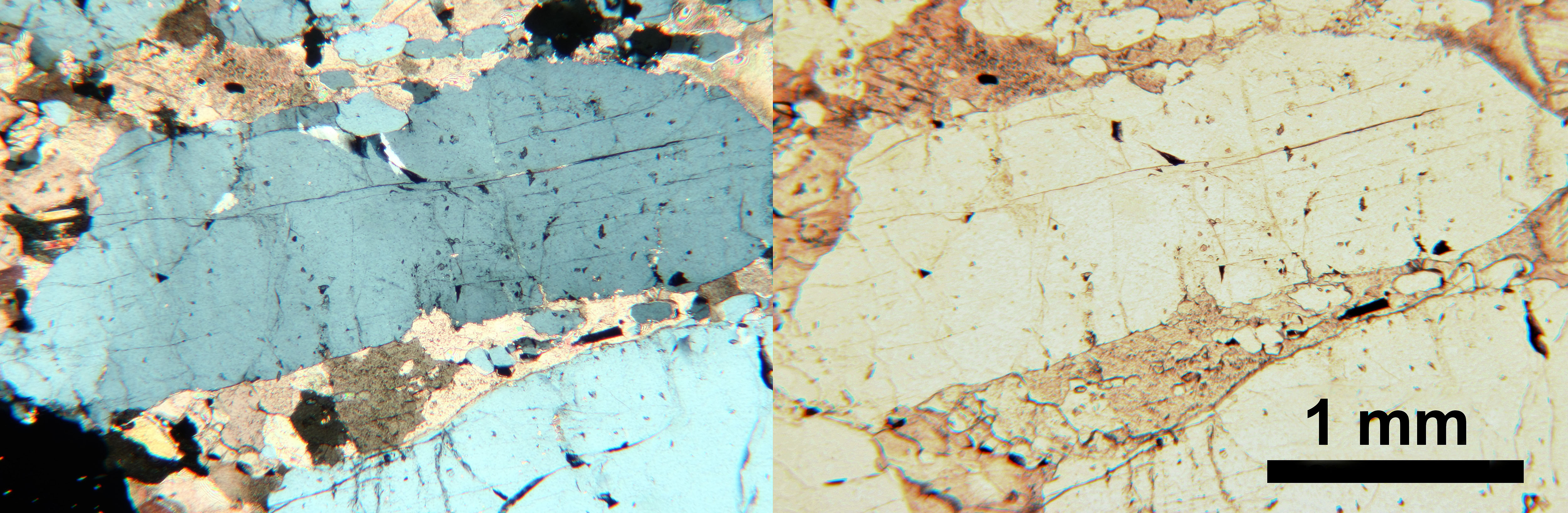
Photomicrographs of thin section from Siilinjärvi apatite ore of fluorapatite grains in carbonate groundmass

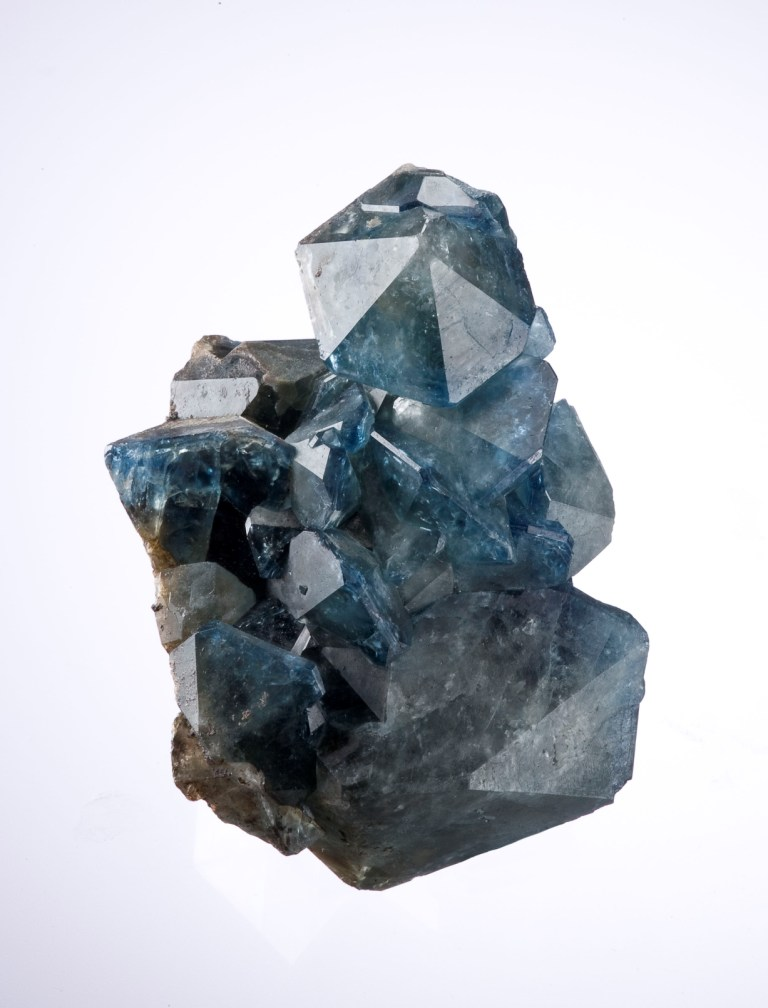
Fluorapatite from São Geraldo do Baixio, Doce valley, Minas Gerais, Brazil

Fluorapatite can be synthesized in a three step process. First, calcium phosphate is generated by combining calcium and phosphate salts at neutral pH. This material then reacts further with fluoride sources (often sodium monofluorophosphate or calcium fluoride (CaF_{2})) to give the mineral. This reaction is integral in the global phosphorus cycle.

3 Ca^{2+} + 2 PO_{4}^{3−} → Ca_{3}(PO_{4})_{2}

3 Ca_{3}(PO_{4})_{2} + CaF_{2} → 2 Ca_{5}(PO_{4})_{3}F

== Applications ==
Fluorapatite as a naturally occurring impurity in apatite generates hydrogen fluoride as a byproduct during the production of phosphoric acid, as apatite is digested by sulfuric acid. The hydrogen fluoride byproduct is now one of the industrial sources of hydrofluoric acid, which in turn is used as a starting reagent for synthesis of a range of important industrial and pharmaceutical fluorine compounds.

Synthetic fluorapatite doped with manganese-II and antimony-V formed the basis for the second generation of fluorescent tube phosphors referred to as halophosphors. When irradiated with 253.7 nm mercury resonance radiation they fluoresced with broad emission which appeared within the range of acceptable whites. The antimony-V acted as the primary activator and produced a broad blue emission. Addition of manganese-II produced a second broad peak to appear at the red end of the emission spectrum at the expense of the antimony peak, excitation energy being transferred from the antimony to the manganese by a non radiative process and making the emitted light appear less blue and more pink. Replacement of some of the fluoride ions with chloride ions in the lattice caused a general shift of the emission bands to the longer wavelength red end of the spectrum. These alterations allowed phosphors for Warm White, White and Daylight tubes, (with corrected color temperatures of 2900, 4100 and 6500 K respectively), to be made. The amounts of the manganese and antimony activators vary between 0.05 and 0.5 mole percent. The reaction used to create halophosphor is shown below. The antimony and manganese must be incorporated in the correct trace amounts if the product is to be fluorescent.

6 CaHPO_{4} + (3+x) CaCO_{3} + (1−x) CaF_{2} + (2x) NH_{4}Cl → 2 Ca_{5}(PO_{4})_{3}(F_{1−x}Cl_{x} + (3+x) CO_{2} + (3+x) H_{2}O + (2x) NH_{3}

Sometimes some of the calcium was substituted with strontium giving narrower emission peaks. For special purposes or colored tubes the halophosphor was mixed with small quantities of other phosphors, particularly in De-Luxe tubes with higher color rendering index for use in food market or art studio lighting.

Prior to the development of halophosphor in 1942, the first generation willemite latticed, manganese-II activated zinc orthosilicate and zinc beryllium orthosilicate phosphors were used in fluorescent tubes. Due to the respiratory toxicity of beryllium compounds the obsolescence of these early phosphor types were advantageous to health.

Since about 1990 the third generation tri-phosphors, three separate red, blue and green phosphors activated with rare earth ions and mixed in proportions to produce acceptable whites, have largely replaced halophosphors.

Fluorapatite can be used as a precursor for the production of phosphorus. It can be reduced by carbon in the presence of quartz:

4 Ca_{5}(PO_{4})_{3}F + 21 SiO_{2} + 30 C → 20 CaSiO + 30 CO + SiF_{4} + 6 P_{2}

Upon cooling, white phosphorus (P_{4}) is generated:

2 P_{2} → P_{4}

Fluorapatite is also used as a gemstone.
