= Fluorcaphite =

Apatite, phosphate mineral

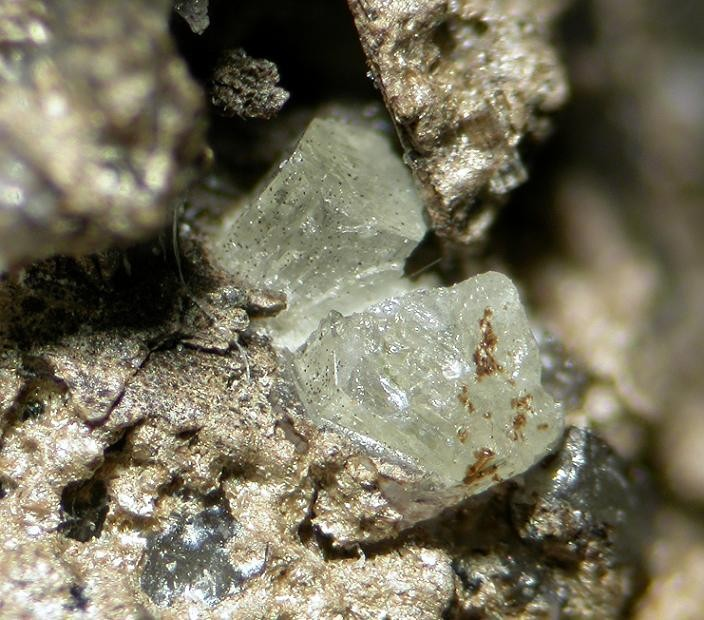

General
- Category: Minerals
- Formula: (Ca,Sr,Ce,Na)_{5}(PO_{4})_{3}F
- Strunz classification: 7/B.39-95
- Crystal system: Hexagonal
- Crystal class: Dipyrimidal
- Space group: P6_{3} (No. 173)
- Unit cell: 545.39 Å^{3} (calculated from unit cell)

Identification
- Formula mass: 671.38
- Colour: Light to bright yellow
- Crystal habit: Prismatic, subhedral crystals
- Fracture: Sub-conchoidal
- Tenacity: Brittle
- Mohs scale hardness: 5
- Luster: Vitreous
- Streak: White
- Diaphaneity: Transparent
- Density: 3.60
- Birefringence: 0.012

Fluorcaphite is a mineral with the chemical formula (Ca,Sr,Ce,Na)_{5}(PO_{4})_{3}F. It is found in the Kola Peninsula in Russia. Its crystals are hexagonal (dipyramidal class) and are transparent with a vitreous luster. It is light to bright yellow, leaves a white streak and is rated five on the Mohs Scale. Fluorcaphite is radioactive.
