= Sokli mine =

Phosphate deposit in Savukoski, Lapland, Finland

- Sokli pilot plant.JPG

Sokli deposit is a large carbonatite reserve located in Lapland, Finland. Sokli represents one of the largest phosphates reserve in Finland having estimated reserves of 12.4 billion tonnes of ore grading 24% P_{2}O_{5}. With significant reserves of Fe, REE, Nb, U, Th, Mn, Zr, Hf, Ta, Cu, and vermiculite.

The Finnish Minerals Group has completed an updated Preliminary Economic Assessment technical report in 2022.
