= Rutan Hill =

Hill in New Jersey, United States

Coordinates: 41°14′44″N 74°40′34″W

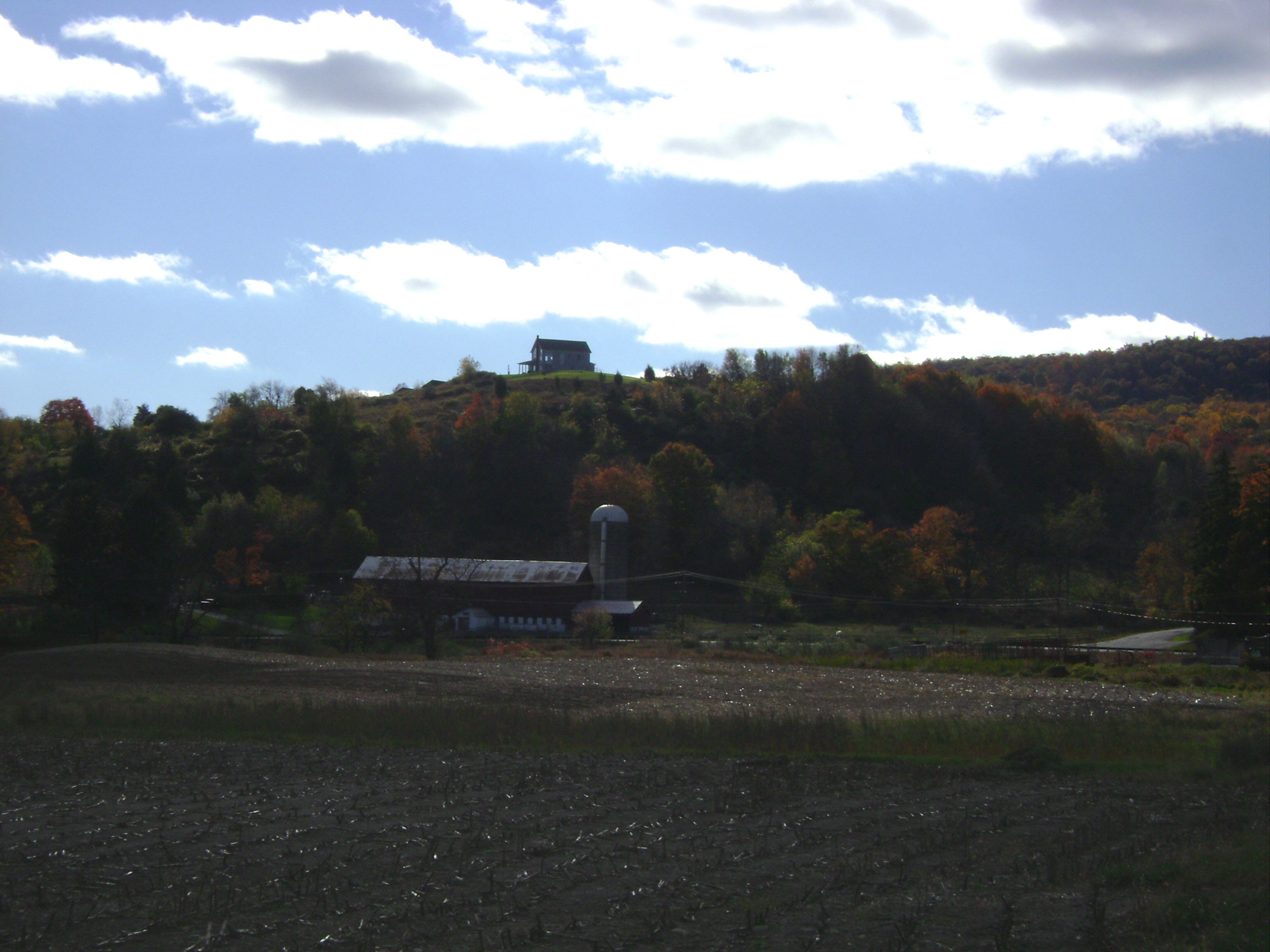
Rutan Hill

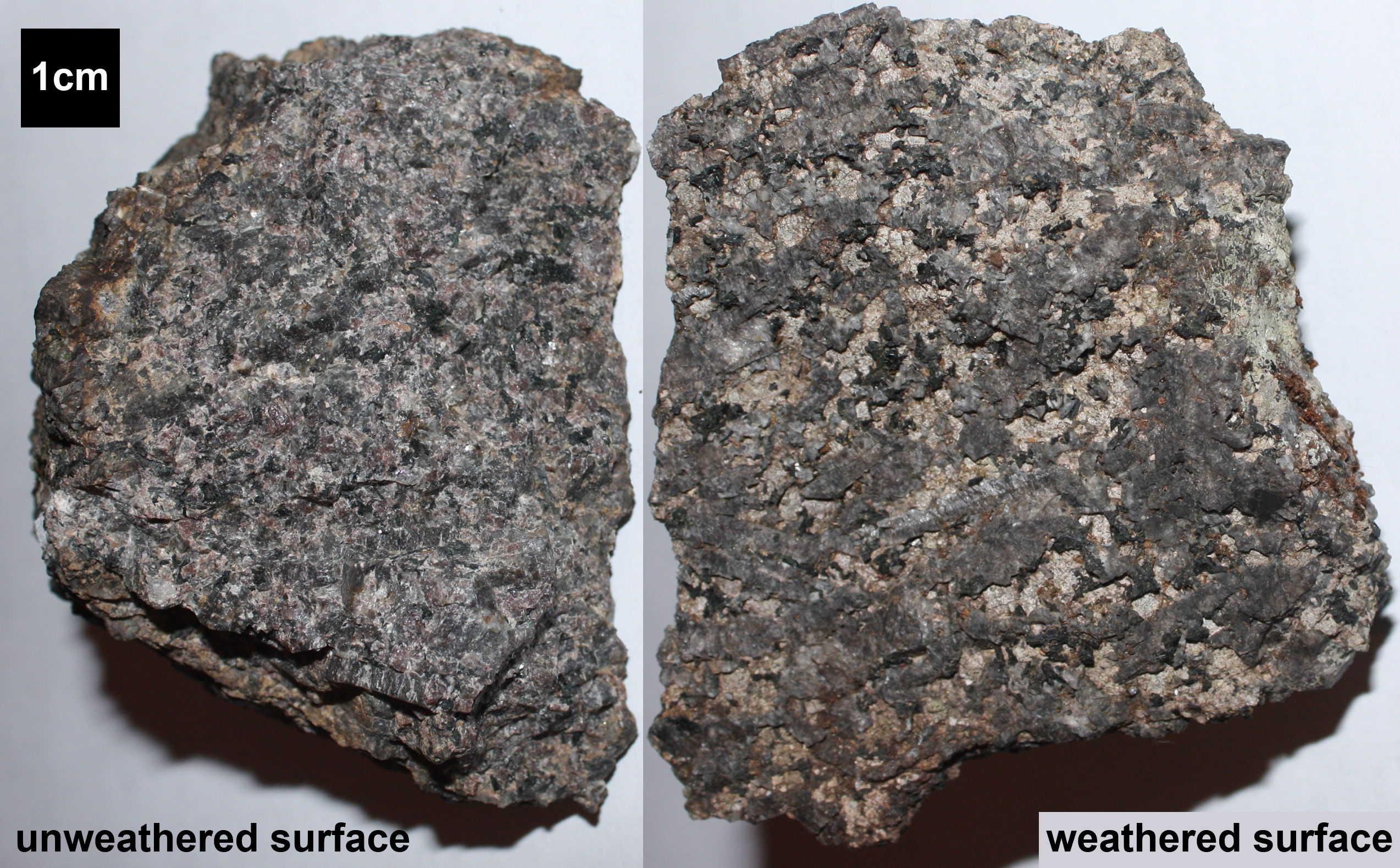
Nepheline syenite from the Beemerville Alkaline Complex

Rutan Hill (also called Volcanic Hill) is the local name for a hill on the United States Geological Survey Branchville 7.5-minute map. It is located about 2.46 miles (3.96 km) south-southwest of Colesville, New Jersey in Wantage Township, of Sussex County, New Jersey in the United States. Rutan Hill rises about 270 feet (82 m) above the adjacent creek valley to an elevation of just over 1,020 feet (310 m). This hill lies entirely within private, posted property. This nondescript hill is the surface expression of a diatreme that is the northern part of the Late Ordovician Beemerville Alkaline Complex.

The surface exposures of the Beemerville Alkaline Complex consist of two large nepheline syenite plutons; a nearby diatreme (Rutan Hill); and several other nearby and much smaller dikes, sills, and diatremes. The two large nepheline syenite plutons are located south-southwest of Rutan Hill along the contact between the Martinsburg and Shawangunk formations and on the southeast side of Kittatinny Mountains. The dikes or sills consist either of phonolite, tinguaite, lamprophyre micromalignite, lamprophyre micromelteigite, or carbonatite. The Beemerville Alkaline Complex also includes several lamprophyric diatremes that contain xenoliths of sedimentary rocks and gneiss and autoliths of carbonatite, potassic syenite, and lamprophyre micromelteigite.

Rutan Hill is the surface expression of the largest of the lamprophyric diatremes within the Beemerville Alkaline Complex. This diatreme contains a small plug-like body of nepheline syenite that is about 30 meters (98 ft) in diameter and is choked with variety of angular to subangular xenoliths and autoliths. The xenoliths consist of shale and graywacke, fine-grained pale-blue dolomite, cream-colored fine-grained limestone, and gneiss. The autoliths consist of nepheline syenite, micromelteigite, and carbonatite. The matrix consists of an extremely fine-grained groundmass with fine-to coarse-grained megacrysts of biotite, diopside, aegerine-augite, orthoclase, magnetite, apatite, and nepheline.

Rutan Hill and the associated Beemerville Alkaline Complex are the surface exposures of a much larger alkaline igneous intrusion that underlies the area of Beemerville, New Jersey. This igneous intrusion is part of the larger Cortlandt-Beemerville magmatic belt. They occur at the western end of the Cortlandt-Beemerville magmatic belt, which spans parts of northern New Jersey and southeastern New York. The Cortlandt complex, New York, defines the eastern end of this belt. Between the Beemerville alkaline complex and the Cortlandt igneous complex, this magmatic belt consists of a linear, almost east–west trending, zone of lamprophyre and felsic dikes.

The currently accepted age for the emplacement Beemerville Alkaline Complex is 420 ± 6 Ma. This age is derived by the fission track dating of titanite. Mean apatite fission-track age of 156 ± 4 Ma is interpreted to represent the time the rocks of the complex were last at temperatures of 60 °C to 100 °C. Previously, Rb-Sr and K–Ar dating of biotite from the nepheline syenite at Beemerville yielded ages of about 435 ± 20 Ma (444 Ma. using current decay constants) for the Beemerville Alkaline Complex. All of these dates are consistent with the observations that the dikes of the Beemerville Alkaline Complex crosscut folded and foliated strata of the Martinsburg Formation as young as early Late Ordovician but are not known to intrude younger rocks.

Based upon emplacement models for diatremes it can be inferred that the diatreme that forms Rutan Hill is the throat of an ancient, extinct volcano. However, erosion following its eruption has either completely destroyed the volcanic cone and any superficial volcanic deposits associated with it or any remaining volcanic deposits lie deeply buried as none have been mapped at the surface within the Beemerville area.

This igneous complex was emplaced and the volcanic activity, which was presumably associated with it, occurred during the end of the Taconic Orogeny in the late Ordovician period. The temporal association with this Ordovician tectonism suggests that this magmatic activity may be related to fracturing of mantle rock at the junction of two Taconic age tectonic salients that intersect in the New York region. The tectonic setting of the intrusive belt is unusual because it is associated in space and time within the zone of compressional mountain building that defined the Taconic Orogeny. At that time, the western half of the Iapetus Ocean lying along the east coast of Laurentia was closing, being subducted beneath the Taconic (or Bronson Hill) Island Arc.
