= Central Iapetus Magmatic Province =

The Central Iapetus magmatic province (CIMP) was a large igneous province (LIP) that occurred during the Ediacaran (615–550 Ma) between several ancient continents – Laurentia and Baltica, and, possibly, Amazonia – during the break-up of the supercontinent Rodinia and resulted in the opening of the Iapetus Ocean.

With a potential radius of up to 4,500 km (2,800 mi), the CIMP was one of the larger volcanic events on Earth, similar in size to the 200 Ma Central Atlantic Magmatic Province. Evidence for the CIMP has also been found in Mexico, Morocco, and Svalbard.

The CIMP coincides with the Marinoan and Gaskiers glaciations and precedes the so-called Cambrian explosion, the evolution of modern lineages.

The CIMP left extensive traces along the Appalachians in eastern North America, to which the Baltoscandian margin is a conjugate. However, no traces of the CIMP have been found in Amazonia, and it is possible that Laurentia and Amazonia separated during 1000 Ma-rifting events.

Four pulses of magmatism associated with the CIMP have been identified:

- The first pulse (615–610 Ma) left extensive traces in the Long Range dykes in Labrador, Canada, but also the Sarek and Ottfjället dyke swarms of the Scandinavian Caledonides, possibly in Greenland.
- Evidence of a second pulse (590 Ma) can be found in the Grenville-Rideau dykes in eastern Laurentia and the Fen and Alnö complexes in Baltica.
- A third pulse (570–560 Ma) left many traces along the Saint Lawrence rift system, for example the Sept Iles layered intrusion, the Catoctin volcanics, and the Labrador Sea-Baffin Bay Rift, including the Manitou Islands.
- A fourth pulse (c. 550 Ma) left many traces in Laurentia, which can be linked to events in Baltica.

It is unclear whether the CIMP was a single plume centre event. The first two pulses have a composition indicative of a LIP, while the last pulse contains ocean island basalts and can therefore be associated with the opening of the Iapetus Ocean.
