= Särna alkaline complex =

The Särna alkaline complex is a group of intrusive igneous rocks in Dalarna, Sweden. Emplacement and cooling of magma into rock occurred during the Carboniferous Period. The complex is aligned with the Oslo Rift, which formed around the same time; it is thought that they are related.

== See also ==
- Alnö Complex
- Fen Complex
- Kola Alkaline Province
- Norra Kärr
