= Morrow Mountain State Park =

State park in North Carolina, United States

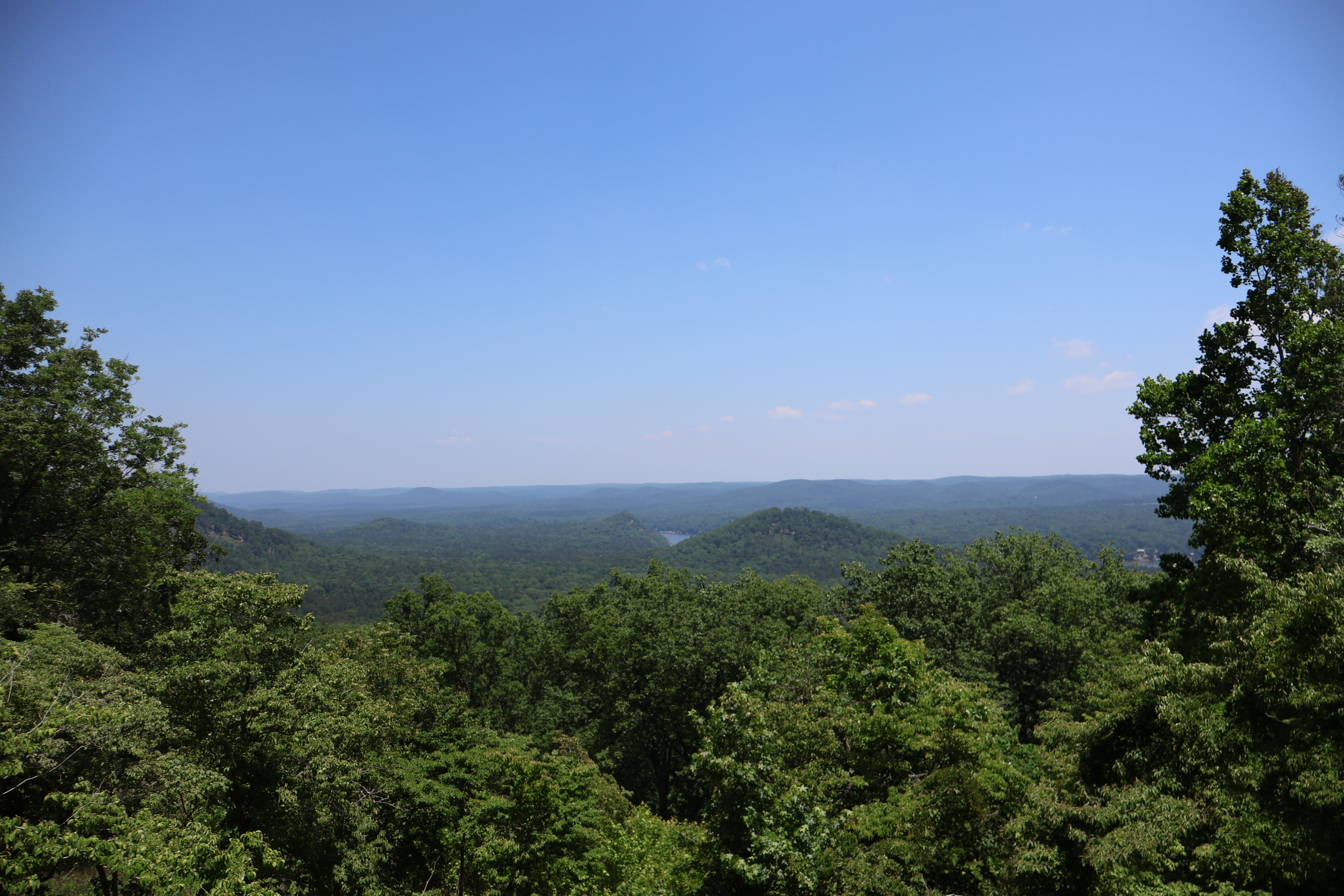
- View from Morrow Mountain

- Location within North Carolina Location within the United States
- Interactive map of Morrow Mountain State Park
- Location: Stanly County, North Carolina, United States
- Coordinates: 35°22′25″N 80°04′25″W
- Area: 5,881 acres (2,380 ha)
- Elevation: 936 ft (285 m)
- Established: 1935
- Administrator: North Carolina Division of Parks and Recreation
- Website: Official website

Morrow Mountain State Park is a state park in Stanly County, North Carolina, U.S. Located near Albemarle, the park includes 5,881 acres (23.80 km^{2}) within the Uwharrie Mountains.

== Geology ==
Well preserved flow bands present on a metarhyodacite rock from Morrow Mountain

The Uwharrie mountain range began ~540 million years ago during the Cambrian. During this time, volcanoes were actively erupting along a peri-Gondwanan subduction zone island arc. The lava's erupted were very viscous (mainly rhyodacite and rhyolite). The Uwharrie mountains were also a part of a much larger exotic terrane called the Carolina terrane. Subduction was thought to be setup near present-day northern South America. Specifically, the Orinoquian-Sunsas, the Trans-Amazonian and the Central Amazonian orogenic zones are likely candidates for potential basement correlatives to the Carolina terrane.

By 550-510 million years ago, the Uwharrie mountains rifted away from Gondwana and entered the Iapetus Ocean. Sometime between 460-430 million years ago, the Carolina terrane accreted onto Laurentia (present day North America. The Cherokee orogeny marks the docking of the two landmasses. The exact timing of accretion onto Laurentia is still largely unknown. One model has accretion during the time of northern Appalachian exotic terrane collisions.

During the Alleghanian orogeny (and the formation of the supercontinent Pangea), ~320-280 million years ago, Uwharrie volcanic rocks underwent low grade metamorphosis. This changed the assemblages of some minerals in the volcanic rocks. Once Pangea rifted apart ~190 million years ago, Uwharrie rocks became metarhyodacite. Many of the current day volcanic rocks are very well preserved. Many metavolcanic rocks at Morrow Mountain still have original flow bands from the time they were erupted.

== Geography ==
Morrow Mountain is one of the highest peaks in the Uwharrie Mountains of central North Carolina. When first formed, these mountains rose to nearly 20,000 feet (6,100 m) above sea level, but erosion has gradually worn them down to little more than high hills that average less than 1,000 feet (300 m) in elevation. These pinnacles are the remains of one of the oldest mountain ranges in the eastern United States. The park contains several peaks, of which Morrow Mountain is a high point at 936 feet (285 m).

The mountain rises some 400 feet (120 m) above the surrounding lower terrain, and on a clear day offers superb views of the surrounding countryside. In addition to the mountains, the park also contains the Yadkin-Pee Dee River, one of central North Carolina's largest river systems. The river can be seen from the overlook atop Morrow Mountain.

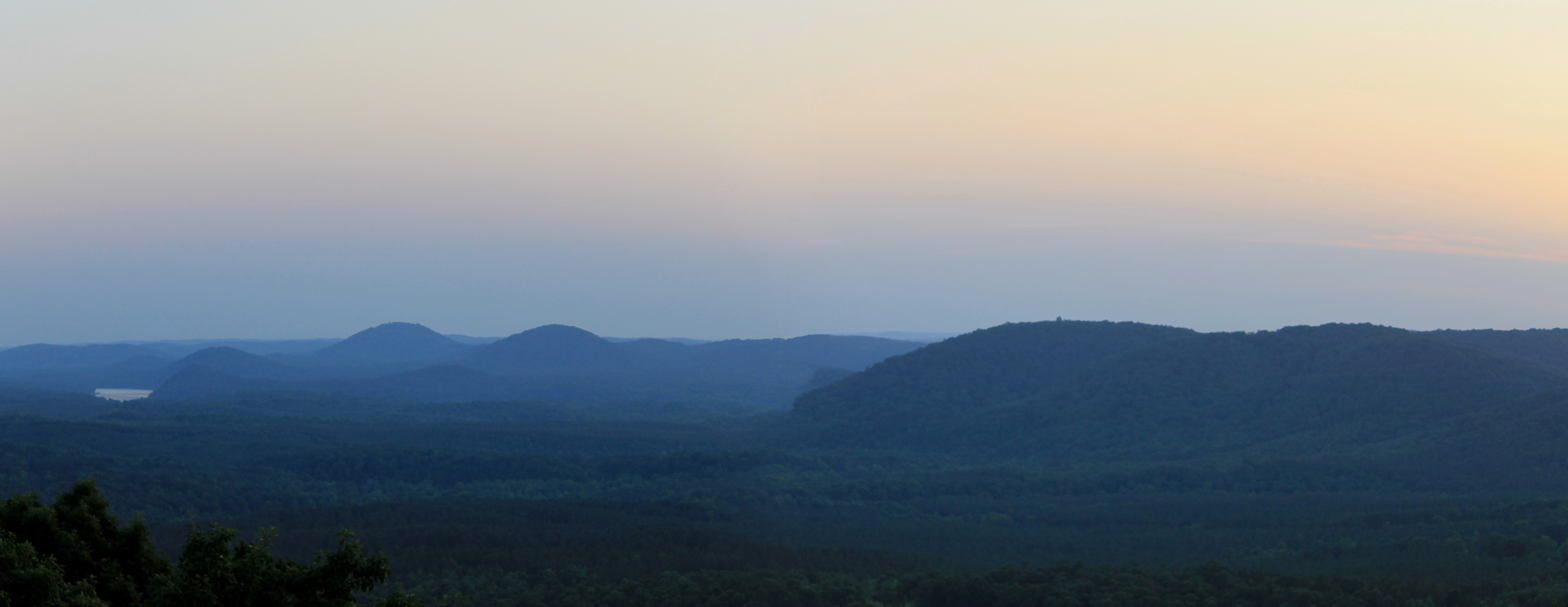
Morrow Mountain State Park (in left distance, 5 miles (8.0 km)) featuring Lake Tillery, Hattaway Mountain, Morrow Mountain, and Sugarloaf Mountain. Viewed from the northeast atop Buck Mountain in Montgomery County NC

== History ==
The discovery of artifacts in the area attests to the presence of Native Americans at least 12,000 years before European settlement. Morrow Mountain was the site of one of the largest quarries in the Piedmont of today's North and South Carolina. Just a little east of the small town of Badin, in northeastern Stanly County, is an archeological dig location known as the Hardaway Site; and it has been a treasure trove for scholars and enthusiasts for decades. Stone tools and weapon points by the thousands have been excavated, and represent one of the most extensive bodies of Native American stone work in existence. The Hardaway Site has been referred to as "The Remington Arms Factory of 10,000 BC", but the raw material for those weapon points and tools came primarily from one location: the top of Morrow Mountain, about 5 miles away. Tools made from this stone, rhyolite—or more accurately for this specific stone, rhyodacite— were traded among native peoples and have been found from Maine to Florida.

European colonization began along the banks of the Pee Dee River in the 1700s. In 1780, John Kirk, a Scotch-Irish settler, established a public ferry linking the area to a major roadway, the Salisbury-Fayetteville Rd. Local legends recount the passage of noted people, including Henry Ford, Thomas Edison and Jefferson Davis.

Development of the park began in the 1930s through the efforts of a local committee interested in establishing a state park in the area. By 1937, more than 3,000 acres (12 km^{2}) of land had been acquired, much of it donated by the citizens of Stanly County. Morrow Mountain is named for one such citizen of Scotch-Irish descent, James McKnight Morrow, who donated more than 1000 acres to the State on June 29, 1920. The park was opened to the public in the summer of 1939.

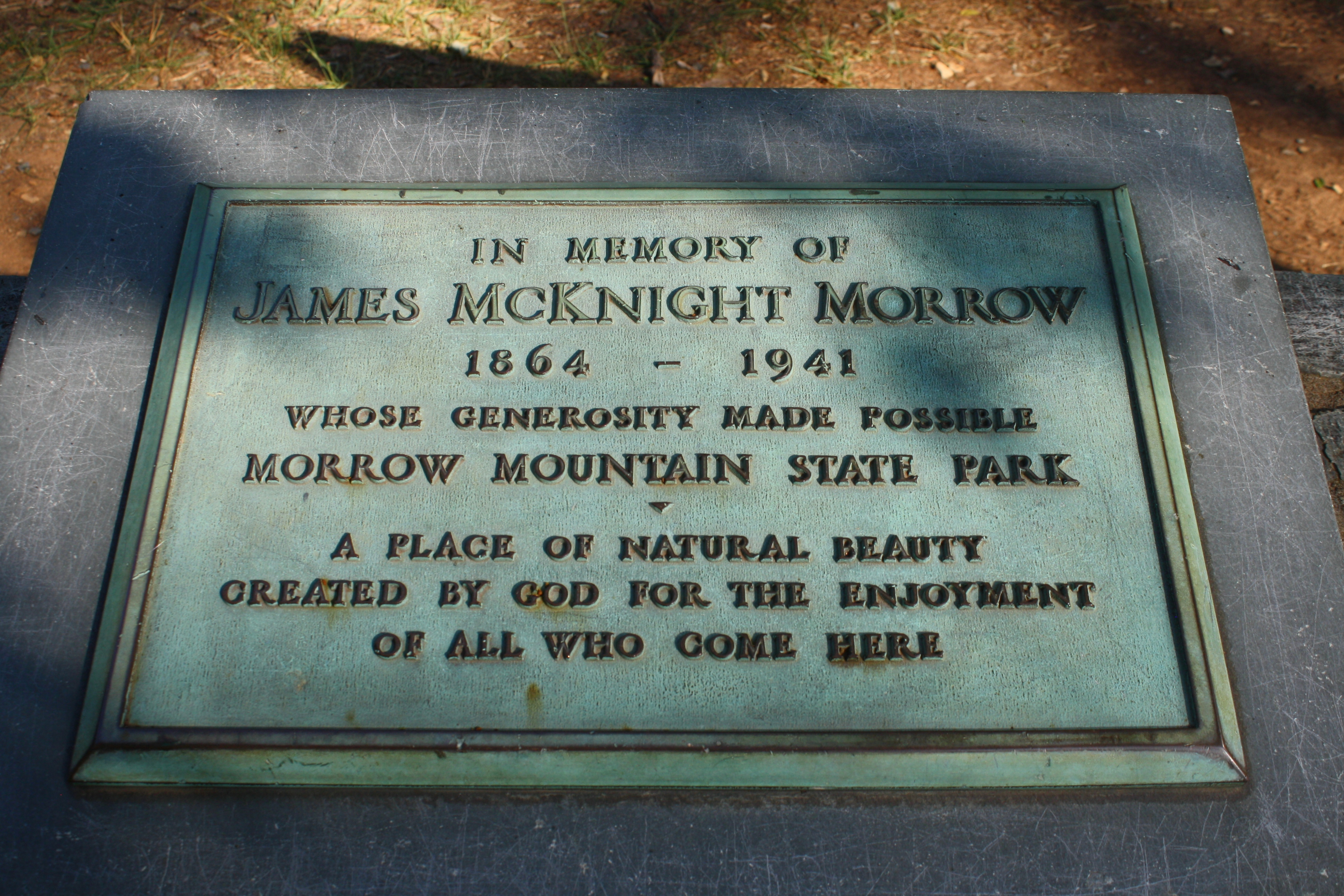
James McKnight Morrow plaque

Early development of park property was a cooperative effort between state and federal governments. Work crews of the Civilian Conservation Corps and the Work Projects Administration constructed many of the facilities from 1937 to 1942. Additional facilities were added with state funds in the 1950s and 1960s.

== Attractions ==
A scenic overlook at the top of Morrow Mountain provides a panoramic view of the area. There is a large parking area along with picnic areas, grills, and a shelter. Boating and fishing are available on Lake Tillery, and an Olympic size swimming pool is open from Memorial Day weekend through Labor Day weekend. Due to varying currents and underwater hazards, swimming is not allowed from the shore of the lake.

== Lake Tillery ==
Part of the Uwharrie River and Pee Dee River system, Lake Tillery was formed when the Tillery Dam was built in 1928. Morrow Mountain State Park has a boat launch as well as a waterfront picnic area and a fishing pier. A boardwalk connects the parking area to the boat launch area. Canoes may be rented from The Boathouse daily during the summer. Spring and Fall rentals are available on weekends from April through October. The Boathouse sells soft drinks and snacks along with ice and bait.

== Kron House ==
A reconstruction of the historic Kron House is on the site at the foot of Fall Mountain. The house was built by a Scottish preacher, William McGregor, who sold it to Dr. Francis Kron on November 2, 1839. Dr. Kron and his family lived here for the remainder of their lives, building their small farm into a sizable tract at one time containing well over 6,000 acres (24 km^{2}). Dr. Kron was born in Prussia and immigrated to America in 1823. He was one of the Southern Piedmont's most famous doctors. Kron was known for traveling for days at a time, making house calls to those bitterly sick. Dr. Kron practiced medicine until after the age of 80. A noted horticulturist, he was also actively involved in education. A Japanese Chestnut tree (Castanea crenata) planted by Kron still thrives and is listed in North Carolina's Champion Big Tree Database. His home, doctor's office and infirmary, and greenhouse appear today much as they did in 1870. Morrow Mountain State Park reconstructed his house in the 1960s and now offers tours. In addition to practicing medicine, Dr. Kron conducted many horticultural experiments and was an active public figure in the county until his death in 1883. Since his wife had died in 1873, ownership of the family holdings passed to his two daughters, Elizabeth and Adele. The sisters began selling their property in 1850 and continued to do so for the remainder of their lives. Elizabeth died in 1896 and Adele in 1910, and both were buried in the family graveyard behind the home.

== Camping ==
Morrow Mountain has four camping areas.

The Family Camping area has three loops where tents, RVs and trailers can be taken. Sites are available with or without electrical hookups, and the park has 6 electric sites that are handicap accessible.

The 6 Group Campsites are on the east side of the park, up a hill near the Tillery shoreline. Up to 35 campers are allowed on each site.

Remote primitive campsites are accessible through the Backpack Trail and have one latrine with no running water. The hike in is approximately two miles. This is a low impact area. Everything, including trash, must be packed in and packed out. Fire rings were recently installed to allow camp fires in this area.

Six cabins are near the park office. One cabin, cabin #6, is handicap accessible. The cabins have modern conveniences such as stoves, drip coffee makers, microwaves, refrigerators, pots and pans and flatware along with outdoor pedestal grills. All have fireplaces and screened back porches furnished with rocking chairs. Guests need to bring their own bedding, towels and coffee filters. Each Cabin has two bedrooms, each with two twin sized beds. The living room couch is a futon that folds out to make a 5th double sized bed.

== Museum ==
A small museum commemorating the history of the Uwharries is on the far end of the Camp Office parking lot. Exhibits include information about Native Americans, area plant and animal communities, early explorers, and rocks and minerals. It is open daily from 10 to 5. It is a self-guided tour.

== Trails ==
With 32 miles (51 km) of trail in the park, Morrow Mountain is one of the most hiked state parks in North Carolina. All hiking trails are blazed. Switchbacks or sharp changes in trail direction are denoted by double-blazing.

Backpack Trail: A 2-mile (3.2 km) trail, this white circle blazed trail takes backpackers to Primitive campsites 1, 2 and 3. It splits from the Morrow Mountain/Sugarloaf Mountain Trail and ends in Campsite 3 by the latrine. At the end of the Backpack Trail, one can bushwhack due South to reach the Bridle Trail, which one can then take to the Morrow Mountain Trail. Difficulty = Easy

Bridle Trail: Morrow Mountain State Park has 16 miles (26 km) of horse trails, which may also be used for hiking. In 2005, the Bridle Trail was split into 3 different trails. In 2006, the State Park renamed spurs of the trail, which now includes a quick 0.35-mile (0.56 km) section known as Duck Blind Cove Spur Trail. The Short Loop (white horse circle blazes) includes a 3.9-mile (6.3 km) hike or ride to and around Morrow Mountain. The Middle Loop is a 5.5 miles (8.9 km) trail, marked with blue circle blazes, and it is a longer trail that includes portions of the Short Loop trail. The Long Loop is a 9.3-mile (15.0 km) trail; it circles the Morrow Mountain vicinity as well as the northern section of the park.

Campground and Pool Trail: This 0.8-mile (1.3 km) trail is blazed with white triangles. This trail starts across from the Morrow Mountain pool and runs through the woods, connecting the pool, the camp office, and the three family campground loops. The trail is mostly in woods, but runs through some undergrowth. The Morrow Mountain amphitheater is also near the end of the trail. The trail ends at campground Loop B, near the Rocks Trail.

Hattaway Mountain Trail: This 2-mile (3.2 km) loop is classified as strenuous. Starting at the Morrow Mountain pool, this trail goes about two tenths of a mile before hikers may choose one of two directions on this loop trail. Turning left leads to an immediate climb up Hattaway, a half-mile trek straight uphill. After reaching the top of the mountain, the hiker will begin to descend the mountain, sharply at first and then slowly. Upon reaching a ridge, the trail rolls up and down the Uwharrie hills for nearly a mile. Along the trail some of the best autumn views can be seen, as hikers can see deep woods. Hattaway offers glimpses of one of the parks many quartz veins.

Fall Mountain Trail: A 4.1-mile (6.6 km) trail blazed with orange triangles, encompasses Fall Mountain in the park's North Eastern region. It is a moderate climb up and then a steep descent down to Lake Tillery. From there, hikers walk the rest of the way along the shoreline. This trail once led to Fall's Dam, but the trail's path is constantly shifting due to erosion.

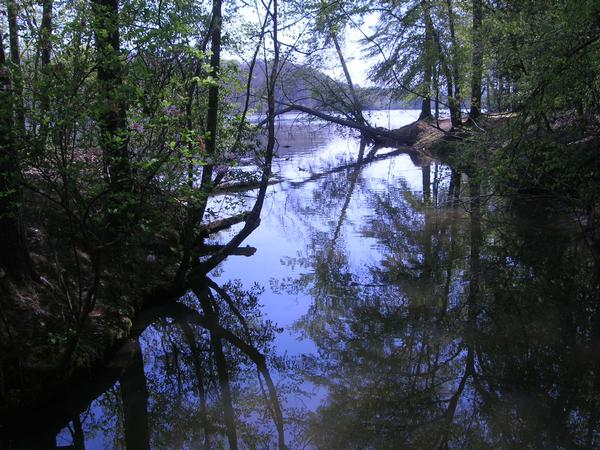
A view of Lake Tillery from the Fall Mountain Trail

Laurel Trail: 0.6 miles (0.97 km), blazed with red hexagons. This short loop trail goes around the Morrow Mountain camping area in deep forest and tall undergrowth. The trail starts at the far end of the camp office parking lot and loops before returning to the start. Turning right at the start of the loop will take you through a deep thicket of undergrowth before finally emerging in deep woods. The trail crosses over many creeks and is the main way to connect to the Morrow Mountain trail. This short loop is the most popular trail in the park for children.

Morrow Mountain Trail: A 2.6-mile (4.2 km) (one way) trail that starts at the camp office and ends at the Mountain Loop Trail at the Overlook, the Morrow Mountain Trail is the most hiked trail in the park. Going up Morrow Mountain (or going down) is a decent climb and for the rest of the trail (blue triangle blazes) the trail rolls up and down hills. The trail is the only way to get to the Backpack trail and also joins the Sugarloaf Mountain trail for a mile. The trail takes hikers through deep flora, and one stretch, called "The Jungle", takes hikers though tall stands of Mountain Laurel.

Mountain Loop Trail: A 0.8-mile (1.3 km) trail, blazed with red squares, that circles the top of Morrow Mountain, this loop trail provides some of the best views in the park. Hikers can look down from the trail into the depths of the park, with visibility of nearly a mile. The Mountain Loop also includes the aforementioned overlook picnic area.

Quarry Trail: A 0.6-mile (0.97 km) trail, blazed with blue hexagons, takes hikers around the edge of the Morrow Mountain picnic area and into the former quarry. For much of the early 20th century, the area was mined for rocks. Hikers may enjoy the evenly cut paths and the washhouses. Near the end of the trail, there is a spur trail to the quarry, where hikers can inspect the quarry handiwork.

Rocks Trail: Some consider the Rocks Trail to be the most scenic trail in the park. A 1.3-mile (2.1 km) (one way) trail blazed with blue squares, the Rocks trail slopes through the rolling hills of the Uwharrie woods. At the end, the Rocks trail goes into a massive rock outcropping at the lakeshore. The rocks are stable, but a large "Warning" sign reminds hikers to watch their footing. The view of Tillery Lake from the Rocks Trail is one of the Uwharrie region's most famous views.

Sugarloaf Mountain Trail: The most strenuous trail in the park, Sugarloaf is a tough haul. Most of the trail is winding hills. This is a 2.8-mile (4.5 km) loop blazed with orange diamonds, starting at the Bridle Trail parking lot. Upon reaching the top, the trail drops about 500 feet (150 m) in a quarter of a mile. After going down, the trail joins the Morrow Mountain Trail before bending off back to the Bridle Trail parking lot. The view from the top of Sugarloaf is often clouded, but on a clear day, Sugarloaf's summit is one of the most scenic viewpoints in the park.

Three Rivers Trail: Officially considered the nature trail of the park, this 0.8-mile (1.3 km) trail, blazed with blue hexagons, has seen better days. Many of the piers that once dotted the Tillery shoreline have fallen in, but the trail is still commonly hiked. The trail, starting in the Tillery/Boathouse parking lot, goes through marshes and woods, connecting all of the park's ecosystems along one short trail. After passing through marshland and coastline, the trail ascends a small hill, where hikers can find deep woods and wildflowers. The trail then slowly descends the mountain.

== Expansion ==
The park added 45 acres (0.18 km^{2}) in 2018 and 25 acres (0.10 km^{2}) in 2019 along Mountain Creek in Stony Hill Church Hardwoods, considered a natural heritage area by the N.C. Natural Heritage Program. The area includes mature hardwood forest and endangered mussels such as Carolina creekshell, as well as the timber rattlesnake.

== Weather ==
The remnants of Hurricane Hugo in 1989 caused enough damage to close the park for two weeks.

The remnants of Hurricane Fran in September 1996 closed the park as fallen trees and other damage had to be cleaned up. Parts of the park reopened January 25, 1997.

The January 2000 North American blizzard closed the park for three months.

The North Carolina ice storm of 2002 closed parts of the park in December 2002.

A line of severe thunderstorms associated with a derecho struck Morrow Mountain State Park and the surrounding area on June 13, 2013. A microburst did severe damage to the park, which was closed for two months. According to a statement from park superintendent Greg Schneider on June 17, "Morrow Mountain took a really big hit from the storm and I suspect that the facilities will be closed for several weeks. We have had lots of damage to park buildings, privately owned automobiles, and of course there are down and leaning trees everywhere." The park office had been damaged by a fallen tree, and one campground cabin had been crushed. Hundreds of trees were down in the park, and Local Fire and Rescue Squad officials had to cut their way up the road to the summit, and Campground to account for any stranded visitors. The campground was also hard hit, with reports of damaged or destroyed RV's and campers. There were no known injuries or fatalities. Parts of the park reopened August 5.
