= Geology of New England =

New England is a region in the North Eastern United States consisting of the states Rhode Island, Connecticut, Massachusetts, New Hampshire, Vermont, and Maine. Most of New England consists geologically of volcanic island arcs that accreted onto the eastern edge of the Laurentian Craton in prehistoric times. Much of the bedrock found in New England is heavily metamorphosed due to the numerous mountain building events that occurred in the region. These events culminated in the formation of Pangaea; the coastline as it exists today was created by rifting during the Jurassic and Cretaceous periods. The most recent rock layers are glacial conglomerates.

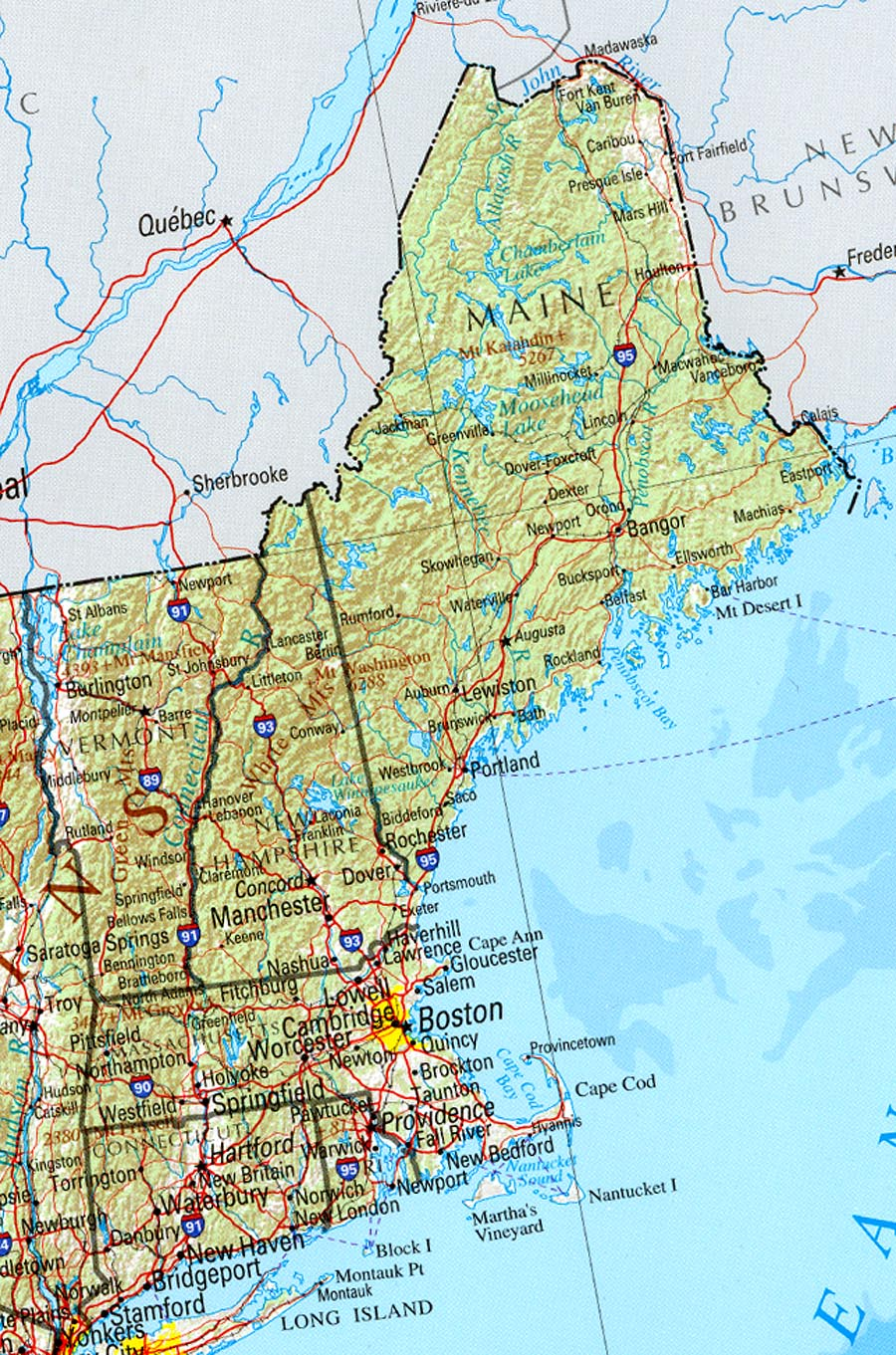

== Chronology ==
=== Overview ===
The bedrock geology of New England was heavily influenced by various tectonic events that have occurred since the Paleozoic Era including the accretion of land masses that formed various continental terranes to the Mesozoic rifting of the Hartford Basin.

=== Archean and Proterozoic eons ===
In the Archean Eon Western Massachusetts and Vermont were the eastern edge of Laurentia (now the Canadian Shield). Laurentia is believed to have originated at the end of the Hadean, making it one of the oldest regions with continental crust, as evidenced by the discovery of Acasta Gneiss in Canada. At the end of the Hadean massive eruptions of felsic lava became cool enough to form a permanent crust. The felsic nature of Laurentia allowed it to float over the denser ocean basins that surrounded it, so it was not submerged under the then-forming oceans. During the Archean Eon the surface of New England was a coastal desert covered by silica-rich sediments with outcroppings of granite bedrock.

=== Paleozoic Era ===
Starting in the Paleozoic Era the supercontinent Pannotia began to break up, forming smaller continents including Laurentia (North America and Greenland), Gondwana, Baltica, and Siberia. At the same time sea levels were rising, which resulted in the flooding of most of the continents with shallow epicontinental seas. This was followed by three periods of extensive orogeny. Much of the geology in New England is based on formation of the Appalachian Mountains through a series of Paleozoic accretion episodes to the terminal collision between Laurentia (proto–North America) and Gondwana (proto–Africa–South America) at ca. 300 Ma.

==== Ordovician Period ====
During the Middle Ordovician period of the Taconic orogeny, volcanic island arcs collided with the eastern coast of North America, causing extensive metamorphism, faulting, and uplift. The result of these processes were the Taconic Mountains, located along the border of New York and New England. After the Taconic orogeny, the Humber seaway was on its way to closure; at the same time, the Dashwoods microcontinent accreted to Laurentia. This then led to the accretion of oceanic terranes including the Bay of Islands in Newfoundland and Thetford Mines Ophiolites in Quebec. Additionally, the Late Ordovician-Early Silurian mélange was present, which consisted of blueschists and deepwater deposits. These blueschists and deepwater deposits indicate that subduction continued during this period of time.

==== Silurian Period ====
Closure of the Tetagouche-Exploits back-arc in the Early Silurian (430 Ma) accreted the bulk of Ganderia to Laurentia. This event is known as the Salinic Orogeny and was responsible for most of the bedrock that is found in New Brunswick, Newfoundland, and Maine. Examples include the Rangeley sequence found in the Presidential Range that consists of Silurian and Devonian Turbidite sequences, Early Silurian Rangeley Formation, the Middle to Late Silurian Perry Mountain, Smalls Falls, and Madrid Formations.

==== Devonian Period ====
The Acadian orogeny took place during the middle to late Devonian. Following the subduction of the Iapetus Ocean floor, the microcontinent Avalonia slammed into eastern North America, which caused another period of metamorphism, faulting, and mountain building. Evidence for these events can be found within the Littleton Formation on the summits of the Presidential Range in northern New Hampshire and southern Maine. The Littleton Formation was deposited in the Early Devonian, approximately 409 million years ago with a Gander and/or Avalon Terrane source. The lower part of this formation is found proximal to the Bronson Hill Island Arc and consists of basaltic and rhyolitic volcanic rocks along with low grade metamorphic shale while the upper part of this formation consists of the youngest rocks of the Presidential Range. This area has experienced extensive deformation which is expressed as pre-metamorphic faults, various folds, thrust faults, and doming. Evidence for igneous activity include the early-Devonian (408 Ma) diorites, early to mid-Devonian (390–400 Ma) granites, and the Carboniferous (360–350 Ma) granites.

==== Carboniferous and Permian periods ====
The Alleghenian Orogeny occurred during the late Paleozoic and was the result of the collision of Africa with North America during the formation of Pangea. The collision events produced tremendous occurrences of thrust faults, folding, and metamorphism. As a result of this collision event a huge mountain belt formed that ran up the east coast of North America into Canada and Baltica, which had collided with Greenland and northern North America. Rocks were newly deformed and folded from the coast to as far as the Allegheny Plateau and the Adirondack Mountains of New York. Although the modern-day Appalachian Mountains have been heavily weathered over time, they were thought to once rival the Himalayas in size.

=== Mesozoic Era ===
==== Jurassic Period ====
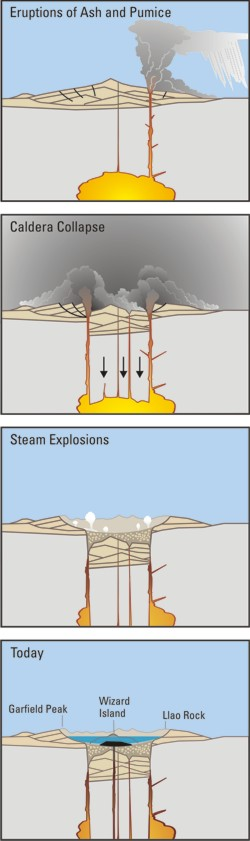
Depiction of the process of a caldera collapse, in this case Mount Mazama but representative of the general progression

New England, like the rest of the eastern United States, does not contain any active volcanoes in the present era. However, the White Mountains region of New Hampshire contains strong evidence of volcanic activity approximately 145 million years ago. Volcanic formation in the White Mountains has been estimated to have occurred between the late Jurassic and early Cretaceous periods, and would have coincided with the separation of Pangaea. As Pangaea broke apart and land masses were shifting, large features like the White Mountains were formed; at the same time, as this multitude of cracks was occurring, magma rose up and filled many of these voids. In this manner calderas were formed throughout the White Mountains as magma receded; these calderas then subsequently erupted on a scale dwarfing the 1980 eruption of Mount St. Helens. The results of these massive eruptions can be found in such places as the Ossipee Mountains, which are located proximal to the White Mountains. The Ossipee Mountains contain substantial amounts of volcanic rock, and the many ring dikes across the region indicate that there was once an active volcano on the site. Volcanic rocks can also be found throughout the White Mountains beyond the Ossipee region, further confirming that eruptions occurred across the area millions of years ago.

=== Cenozoic Era ===
==== Quaternary Period ====
Much of the geomorphology and surficial deposits of New England are a result of glaciation in the Quaternary period. The scoured New England landscape reveals evidence of the Wisconsin Glacial Period.

==== Surficial deposits ====
The continental ice sheet over New England was more than a mile thick in some places. Grinding and plucking over the landscape created wore down topography and created poorly sorted to well sorted surficial deposits. Large terminal moraines composed of poorly sorted till are present along coasts and can be identified by their thin, patchy, and stony texture. Maine is bordered by moraines that identify the terminus margins of the past ice bodies. The Waldoboro terminal moraine sits on the southeastern coast, while the Highland front moraine parallels the northwestern border. Large continental ice sheets (see Laurentide Ice Sheet) most likely created the large moraines, as it takes time for the long, lumpy ridges to form at a massive scale.

New England is best known for its high density of erratics, which are displaced rocks that differ from the immediate bedrock composition of the region and range from the size of pebbles to boulders. Their surfaces are generally rounded and polished due to rasping. While the bedrock of the area is largely igneous granite, the erratics are sandstone and slate blocks. Sedimentary erratics are visible across the highest peak in Maine, Mount Katahdin.

Glacial outwash that is well sorted and stratified due to the systematic nature of Stokes' Law is visible in gravel pits in Maine's Grafton Notch State Park Outwash plains are composed of alternating layers of sand and gravel that have been deposited in deltas of glacial lakes and alluvial fans.

===== Erosional processes =====
The slow and grinding movement of continental ice sheets and alpine glaciers across the landscape creates erosional landforms. Abrasion, plucking, and freeze-thaw action creates the U-shaped valley unique to glacial erosion.

The intense pressure from the ice causes abrasion. This process carves striations, or grooves, into the bedrock as the glacier moves down a slope. Glacial striations help determine the direction of a glacier; visible outcrops in the White Mountains, for instance, indicate ice flow toward the south-southeast. Abrasion also produces rock flour which is visible in glacial outwash plains across New England.

Maine has some of the longest eskers in the world. As the climate began to warm, the glaciers began to melt and drainage from meltwater under the glacier formed huge torrents of sediment that, when compacted, left a long and sinuous ridge or kame. Moose Cave in Grafton Notch is speculated to have been formed in part by a subglacial river. Abol esker in Baxter State Park is a notable serpentine kame.

Kame and kettle topography is commonplace across Maine. Hummocky morphology includes kettle ponds and kettle lakes that are “steep-sided, bowl-shaped depressions in glacial drift deposits" where large blocks of ice melted as the glacier recessed.

Other notable glacial features include cirques, which are visible in mountains such as Mt. Katahdin and Crocker Mountain, indicative of glacial erosion.

===== Pleistocene Epoch =====
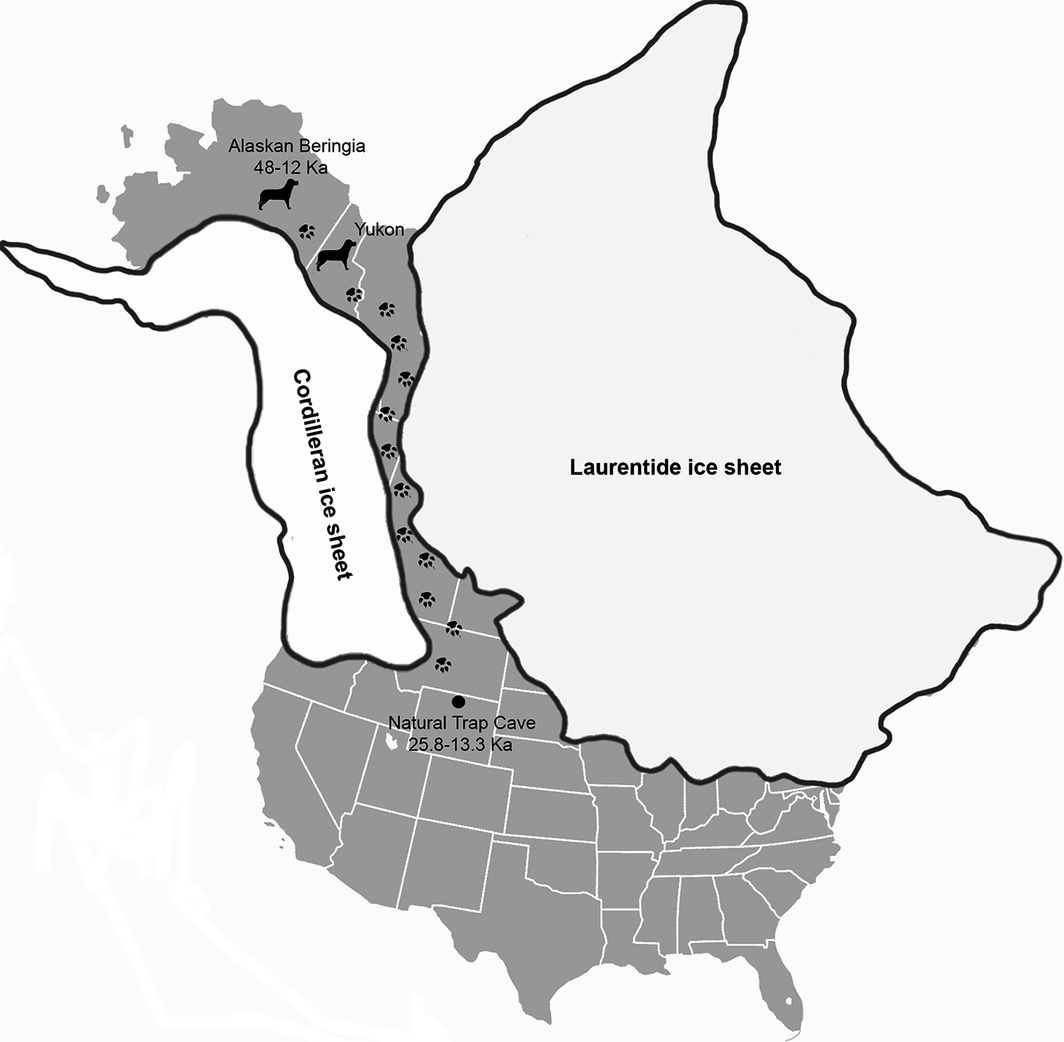
Depiction of the Laurentide Ice Sheet covering most of Canada and the Northern United States

The Laurentide Ice Sheet, which covered Canada and what is currently the New England landscape, was a massive sheet of ice and the primary feature of the Pleistocene epoch in North America. Geologists are currently working on calculating the thinning of the Laurentide Ice Sheet, which can improve the accuracy in de-glacial paleoclimate models and ice margins. Geologic records in the Northeastern United States can help reconstruct ice sheet volume history as well as the contribution of the Laurentide Ice Sheet to sea level rise.

Cosmogenic Nuclides are radioactive isotopes formed when high-energy particles (i.e. cosmic rays) interact with the nuclei of Solar System atoms. Calculating the abundance of these nuclides is a way to determine the age of exposure of surface rock, also known as Surface Exposure Dating.

A group of geologists in New England have been using an age-exposure method called the 'Dipstick' Approach, which can determine the rates of ice-sheet thinning and the age of glacially eroded boulder and bedrock surfaces. This approach has been used on various New England mountains, including Mt. Greylock, Mt. Mansfield, Mt. Washington, etc. Their research supports rapid de-glaciation around New England, further constraining previous estimates of the Laurentide Ice Sheet thinning rates.

==== Meltwater Pulse 1a ====
Thinning of the LIS was caused by rapid warming of the Northern Hemisphere produced by a sudden shift towards an interstadial AMOC from 14.6–14.3 ka, a period also known as the Bølling warming. This change in climate caused global sea levels to rise 9–15 m due to deglaciation of Northern Hemisphere ice sheets.

It is uncertain what particular ice sheets contributed the most to the significant sea level rise, but evidence collected from cosmogenic nucleotide dating indicates rapid thinning of the Laurentide Ice Sheet during the Meltwater Pulse 1a (MWP-1A) which could mean the LIS was a main source of glacial meltwater during this time.

==== The Younger Dryas and Onset of the Holocene ====
After MWP-1A, around 12.9 ka, the Northern hemisphere experienced a sudden drop in temperatures caused by a reduction in the AMOC towards a stadial mode, which is implicated to be caused by the influx of glacial meltwater from the LIS and is a period known as the Younger Dryas. The AMOC recovered back to an interstadial mode by 11.7 ka which marked the beginning of the Holocene Epoch.

===== Holocene Epoch =====
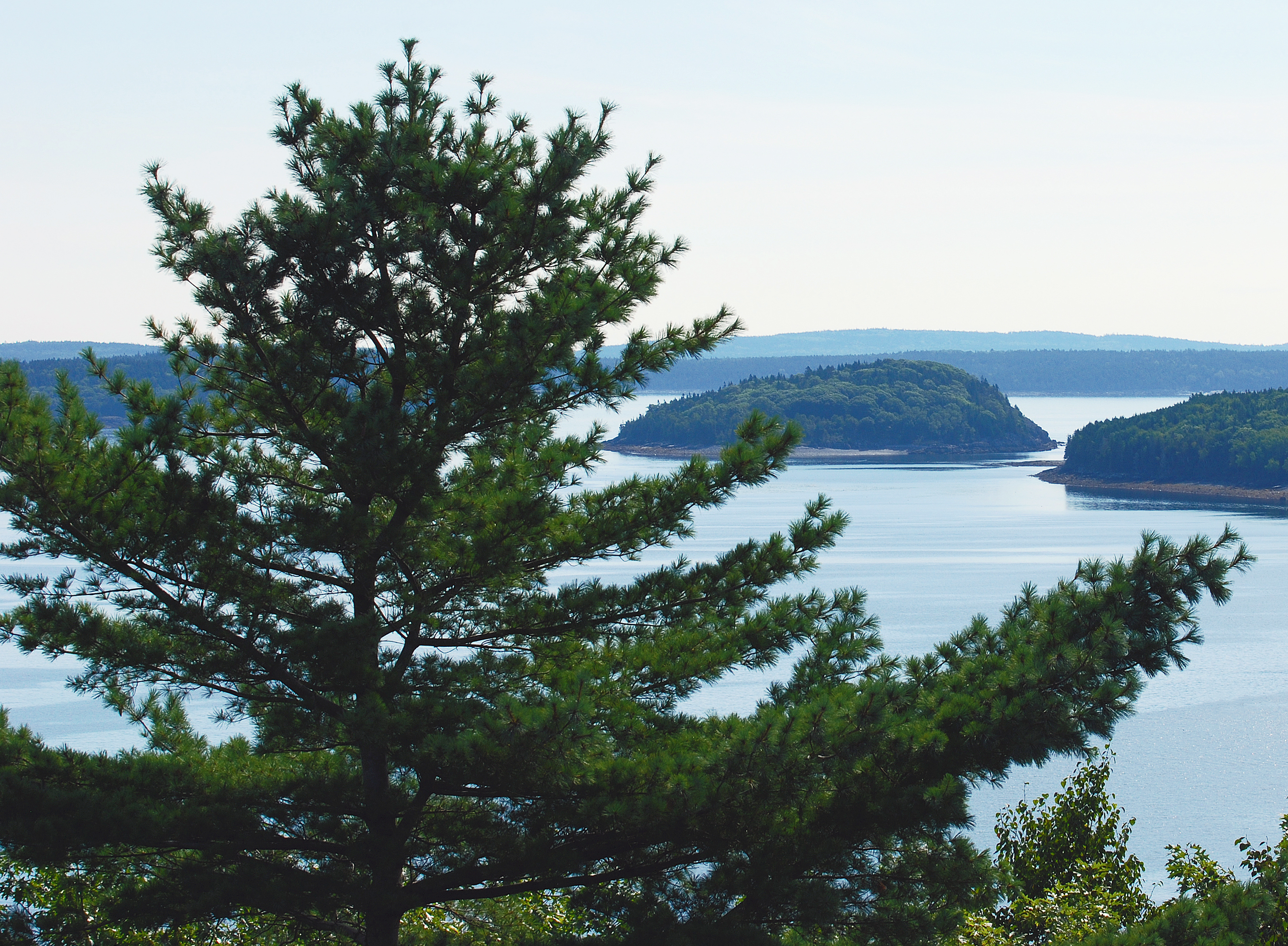
The White Pine rose in New England shortly after the first deglaciation

Following the glacial melting of the Laurentide Ice Sheet, new vegetation and warmer climate caused new New England to become inhabitable by early human settlers. This new climate, combined with an ample supply of hard volcanic rock and other natural features, created an ideal area for human settlement. These settlers fashioned tools, such as arrowheads, from surficial rhyolite deposits they found near what could have been their river valley settlements.

The melting of the Laurentide Ice Sheet (beginning by 18,000 cal yr BP) caused significant ecological and climatic change in the region. Except for a number of abrupt climate reversals, the most extreme being the cold reversal of the Younger Dryas, the climate of the region generally experienced a rise in temperature (of up to 2˚ Celsius) during the early Holocene. Fossil pollen findings indicate that the increased temperature in the region paralleled new vegetation patterns, such as the rise of hemlock and white pine in New Hampshire and the White Mountains. These vegetation shifts created ecological environments in the region where habitation by migratory caribou, which were hunted by early human settlers, was possible. These settlers could have moved to recently formed dune fields, which were produced by wind erosion of glacial outwash deposits, such as those found in the Ohio Valley, in the Hudson and Connecticut River valleys, and in the Israel River valley. Early human settlers could have populated these river valleys in order to observe the caribou migrating northeast along the newly formed rivers.
