= Kola Alkaline Province =

Alkaline-ultramafic rock complexes in the Kola Peninsula

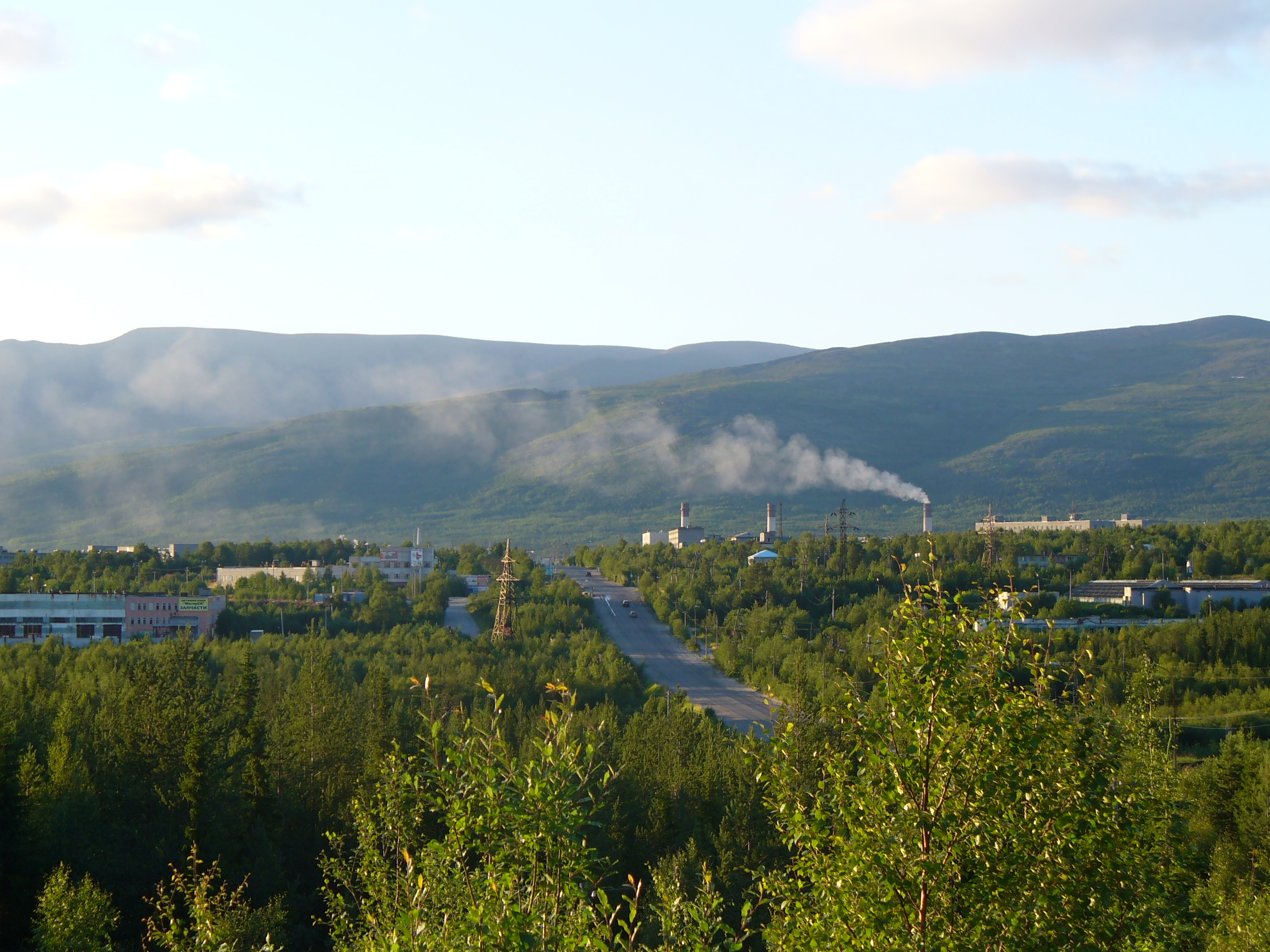
Outskirts of the town Apatity where mining of apatite ore from the Kola alkaline Province is the main economic activity. In the background is the Khibiny Mountains, a giant and protruding body of nepheline syenite.

The Kola Alkaline Province or Kola Alkaline Carbonatite Province is a discontiguous group of unusual igneous rocks centered in the Kola Peninsula of Russia and with outliers in nearby areas of Finland and in Arkhangelsk Oblast across the White Sea. The province is made up of alkaline-ultramafic rock complexes often associated to carbonatites and stand-alone dykes and pipes made up of carbonatites, kimberlites and similar rocks. To this it adds the large nepheline syenite bodies of the Lovozero Massif and the Khibiny Mountains. An estimate puts the total volume of the rocks of the Kola Alkaline Province at 15,000 ±2,700 km^{3}.

The more mafic silicate rocks of the province originated from small degrees of partial melting in a source region in Earth's mantle made up of garnet-bearing peridotite. The lithosphere had thicknesses similar to present-day (200 km) conditions when magmas originated in the Devonian. Prior to Devonian magmatism the Kola and Karelia region had experienced a long history of low-frequency alkaline and carbonatite volcanism.

The Permian rocks of the Kola Alkaline Province is commonly presumed to represent an igneous hotspot created by a mantle plume. The relation of Kola Alkaline Province to other igneous or tectonic features is not clear. Some have suggested a link to the Permian Dnieper-Donets Rift while others have considered it as part of a much larger a "North Atlantic Alkaline Province".

== See also ==
- Alnö Complex
- Apatit, company that mines ores from the Kola Alkaline Province
- Fen Complex
- Norra Kärr
