= Fen Complex =

Region in Norway

Coordinates: 59°16′04″N 9°16′40″E

The Fen Complex (Norwegian: Fensfeltet) in Nome Municipality, Telemark county, Norway, is a region noted for an unusual suite of igneous rocks. Several varieties of carbonatite are present in the area as well as lamprophyre, ijolite and other highly alkalic rocks. It is the type locality for fenite, a metasomatic rock commonly found around carbonatite and alkali intrusives.

The Fen Complex is a roughly circular area about three kilometres in diameter. It is located just west of the Oslo graben. Radiometric age dating on the carbonatites gave an age of 539 +/- 14 Myr. The host rocks for the intrusions are middle Proterozoic granites and gneiss and the complex was associated with the Cambrian rifting of the cratonic rocks.

The complex is a protected location because of the rare minerals and rock types found there. The rocks were first described by Waldemar Christofer Brøgger in 1921. In 2026, Rare Earths Norway reported an updated estimate of 15.9 million metric tons of rare earth oxides, an 81% increase from a 2024 estimate of 8.8 million tons. The deposit includes significant amounts of neodymium and praseodymium, elements used in permanent magnets for technologies such as electric vehicles and wind turbines.

In regard to case work on mining permits: In Q2 2026, the Norwegian government said that it is taking over the case-work - from the municipality.

As of Q4 2026, Rare Earths Norway has decided that it is going to build a pilotanlegg (a kind of facility, for refining ore), in Nome municipality.

== See also ==
- Alnö Complex
- Kattsund-Koster dyke swarm
- Kola Alkaline Province
- Norra Kärr
- Särna alkaline complex
