= Jinshajiangite =

Rare silicate mineral

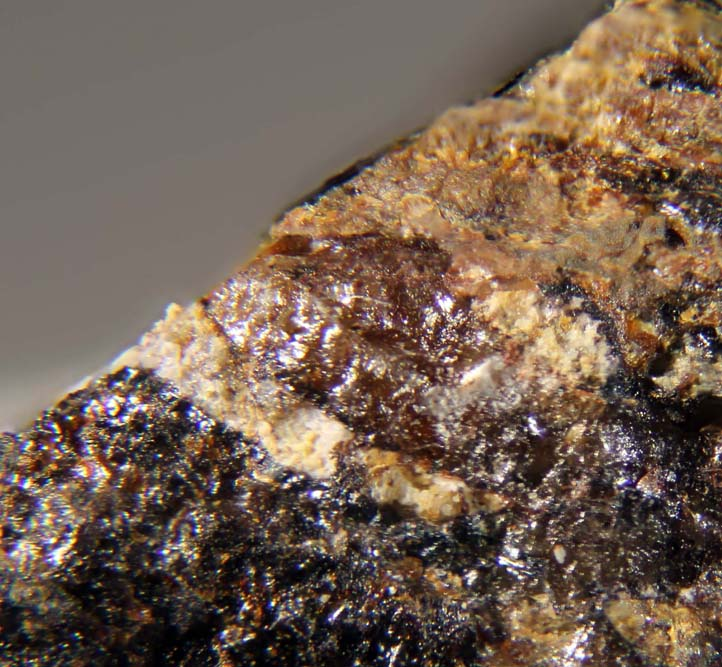
- Jinshajiangite crystals. Locality: Luku Mine, Panzhihua, Sichuan Province, China

General
- Category: Sorosilicate
- Formula: BaNaFe_{4}Ti_{2}(Si_{2}O_{7})_{2}O_{2}(OH)_{2}F
- IMA symbol: Jsh
- Strunz classification: 9.BE.67
- Crystal system: Monoclinic
- Crystal class: Prismatic (2/m) (same H-M symbol)
- Space group: C2/m
- Unit cell: a = 10.6785, b = 13.786 c = 20.700 [Å], β = 94.937°

Identification

Jinshajiangite is a rare silicate mineral named after the Jinshajiang river in China. Its currently accepted formula is BaNaFe_{4}Ti_{2}(Si_{2}O_{7})_{2}O_{2}(OH)_{2}F. It gives a name of the jinshajiangite group. The mineral is associated with alkaline rocks. In jinshajiangite, there is a potassium-to-barium, calcium-to-sodium, manganese-to-iron and iron-to-titanium diadochy substitution. Jinshajiangite is the iron-analogue of surkhobite and perraultite. It is chemically related to bafertisite, cámaraite and emmerichite. Its structure is related to that of bafertisite. Jinshajiangite is a titanosilicate with heteropolyhedral HOH layers, where the H-layer is a mixed tetrahedral-octahedral layer, and the O-layer is simply octahedral.

The mineral has only two known places of natural occurrences; a dyke near Jinshajiang River, Sichuan Province and the intrusion of Norra Kärr in Sweden.
