= Ammonoosuc Volcanics =

Geologic feature in Vermont

- Stratigraphic range: 460.1 ± 2.4 Ma
- Type: Geological formation
- Sub-units: Lyman Member, Mullikin Brook Member, Smutty Hollow Member, West Bath Member
- Underlies: Partridge Formation
- Overlies: Albee Formation

Lithology
- Primary: gneiss, schist, amphibolite
- Other: greenstone, phyllite, granofels

Location
- Region: New England
- Country: United States
- Extent: New Hampshire, Vermont

The Ammonoosuc Volcanics is a rock unit in parts of New Hampshire and Vermont in the United States. This unit is named for the Ammonoosuc River that runs through the portion of New Hampshire that houses the Ammonoosuc Volcanics.

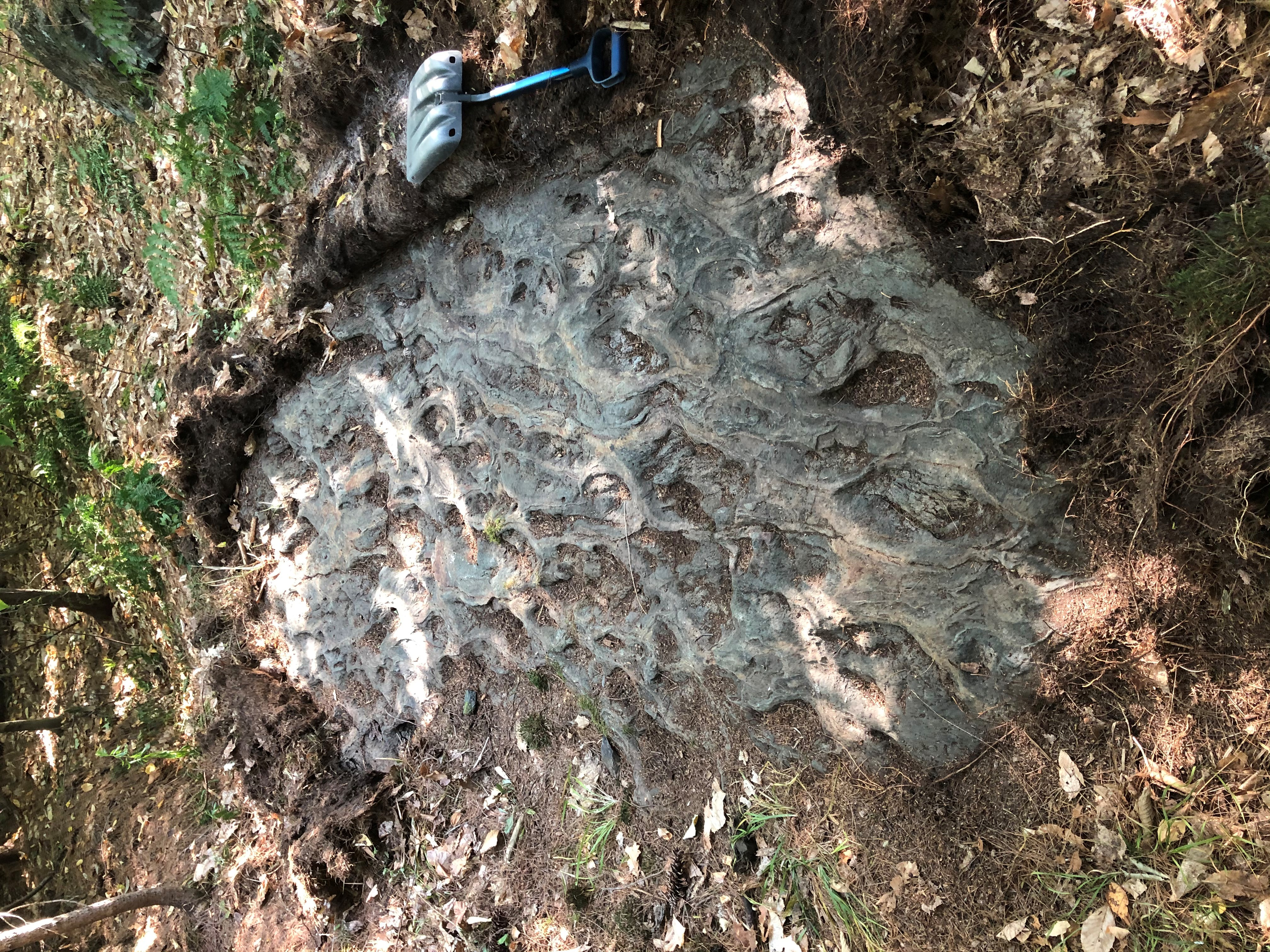
Pillow basalt in the Ammonoosuc Volcanics exposed as a glacial pavement. Lyme, NH, USA

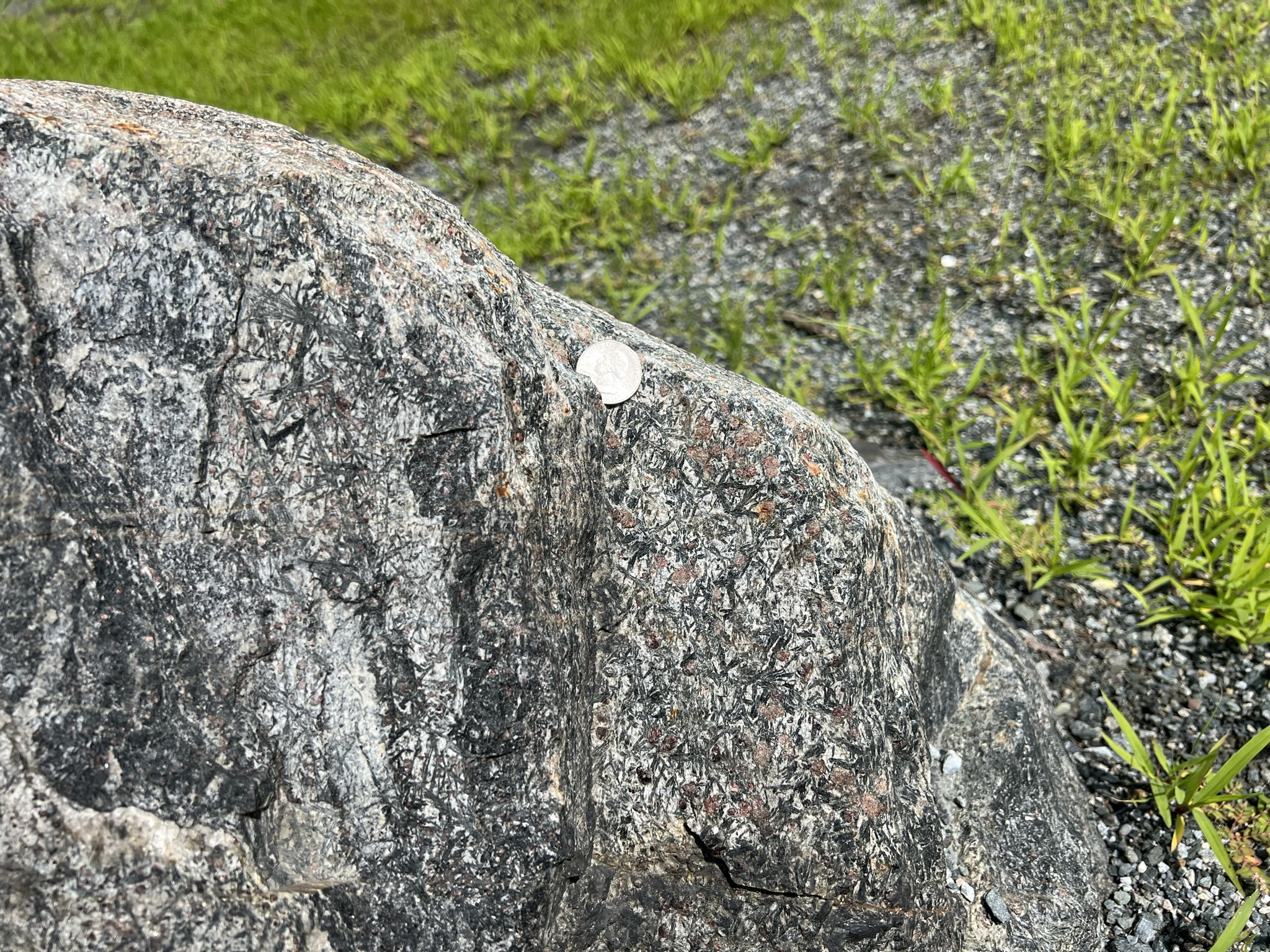
Garnet amphibolite in Ammonoosuc Volcanics at Shattuck Observatory, Hanover, NH

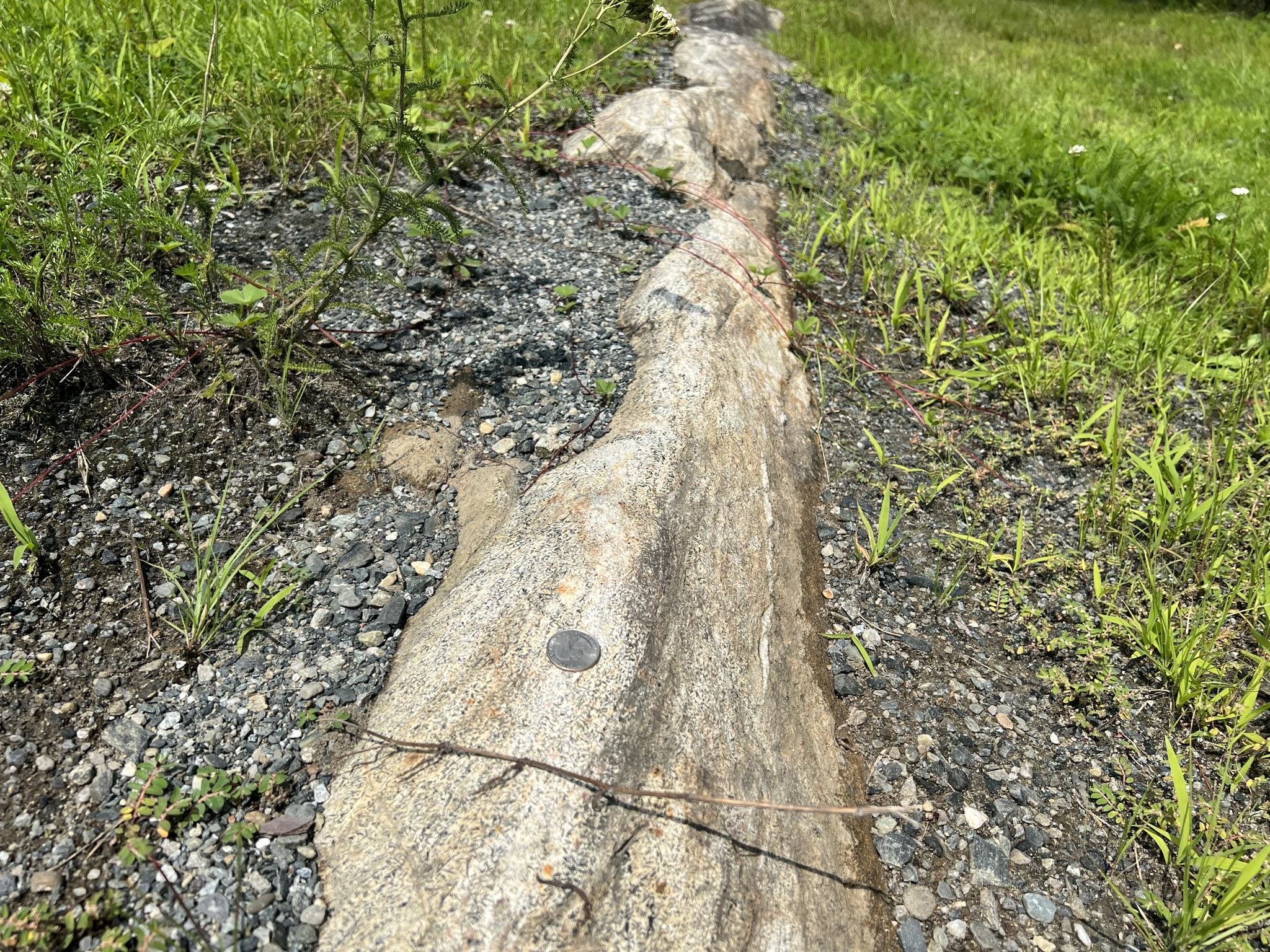
Felsic layer in Ammonoosuc Volcanics, Hanover, NH

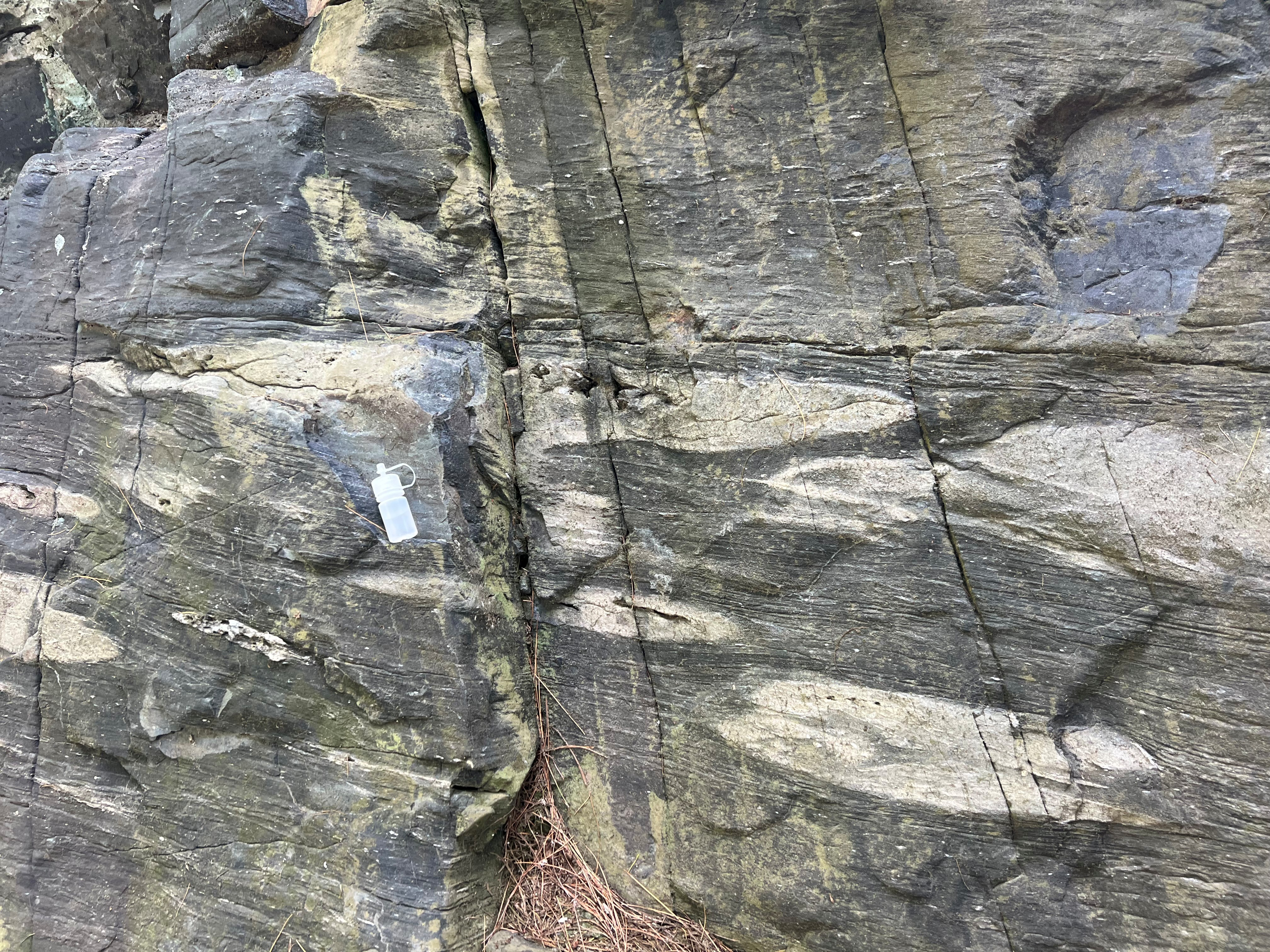
Possible pillow basalt in the Ordovician Ammonoosuc Metavolcanics, Hanover, NH

== Setting ==
The Middle Ordovician Ammonoosuc Volcanics are a component of the Bronson Hill Arc, which is approximately 400 km (250 mi) long and reaches from the Quebec border down to southern Connecticut. The Bronson Hill Arc is made up of both volcanic and plutonic sequences of felsic and mafic rocks, whose ages range from the Cambrian into the Lower Devonian. The Bronson Hill Arc is also a part of the New Hampshire sequence and is sometimes referred to as the Bronson Hill anticlinorium. The Ammonoosuc Volcanics are stratigraphically situated in the New Hampshire sequence on top of the Albee Formation and below the Partridge Formation. The contacts between these units are usually quite sharp but could grade into one another over a few meters in some localities. The geographical setting of the Ammonoosuc Volcanics and the Bronson Hill Arc is thought to be the location of the now closed Iapetus Ocean. Petrochemical analysis of the unit concluded that the mafic rocks in the area showed island-arc tholeiite and backarc basin signals, which would support this idea.

== Origin ==
The origin of the Ammonoosuc Volcanics can be traced back to the Taconic orogeny, an Ordovician mountain-building event in the New England area that occurred after the Bronson Hill Arc accreted to the existing continent. The Ammonoosuc Volcanics originally formed along the far edge of the Iapetus Ocean relative to New England. As the Iapetus Ocean closed, the Ammonoosuc Volcanics got closer to what is now New England until they were eventually accreted as a section of the Bronson Hill arc. It is thought that the Ammonoosuc Volcanics were formed by partial-melting of basaltic materials during this time, and became metamorphosed later during the orogeny.

== Rock description ==
The Ammonoosuc Volcanics are a group of highly metamorphosed volcanic and volcaniclastic rocks, with some metasedimentary units as well. The group is largely made up of massive or layered beds of greenstone, amphibolite, schist, gneiss, and phyllite. The rocks are mostly mafic, but there is plenty of felsic material as well. These metafelsites are aphanitic in texture and often contain phenocrysts of feldspar and quartz. There are some volcanic structures and textures present in the Ammonoosuc Volcanics, including deformed pillows of material and even some volcanic breccia. There are also plenty of intrusions, including sills, dikes, and large misshapen masses of other rocks, primarily trondhjemites and tonalites. There is a fault that cuts through the Ammonoosuc Volcanics in certain areas, known as the Ammonoosuc fault. The metamorphic grade on the southeastern side of the fault is distinctly higher than the other side, so many of the volcanic textures and features that were present have been destroyed or are no longer present there. The Ammonoosuc Volcanics actually consist of four major subunits: the Lyman Member, the Mullikin Brook Member, the Smutty Hollow Member, and the West Bath Member. These subunits are defined by the U.S. Geological Survey, but no information is given on how to distinguish these members from each other. The unit is heavily intruded by many dikes, sills, and small sections of gneiss and schist.

=== Mineralogy ===
While there are many different rock types in the Ammonoosuc Volcanics, there are two dominant lithologies and mineralogies: hornblende-plagioclase amphibolite and quartz-plagioclase granofels. The ratio of these mafic mineral compositions to felsic mineral compositions in the Ammonoosuc Volcanics is estimated to generally be about 5:1, but can be close to 5:3 in certain localities. There is no significant component of intermediate rocks. Southeast of the Ammonoosuc fault, the Ammonoosuc Volcanics are mostly Ca-poor amphibolites bearing hornblende, plagioclase, and biotite. The felsic material that makes up some of the Ammonoosuc Volcanics is not close to this fault, and is typically granofels, composed primarily of quartz, Na-rich plagioclase, biotite, and sometimes contains garnets, magnetite, or epidote locally. The granofels are found interbedded with amphibolites (either thinly or massively) and are interpreted to be metamorphosed quartz tuffs.

=== Chemical composition ===
A great deal of the felsic material in the Ammonoosuc Volcanics is found in the form of trondhjemite, a type of tonalite in which the majority of the plagioclase is oligoclase. The table below compares the chemistry of the Ammonoosuc Volcanics to the definition of a trondhjemite.

Weight percent of oxides in the Ammonoosuc Trondhjemites compared to the Trondhjemite definition
| Oxide | Ammonoosuc Trondhjemite (percent) | Regular Trondhjemite (percent) |
|---|---|---|
| $\ce{SiO2}$ | 73.1-80.6 | >68, usually <75 |
| $\ce{Al2O3}$ | 11.3-13.5 | <14 @ 75% $\ce{SiO2}$ |
| $\ce{FeO}$ + $\ce{MgO}$ | 0.44-4.44, average 2.7 | <3.4 |
| $\ce{FeO}$/$\ce{MgO}$ | 2.1-13.3, average 5.6 | 2-3 |
| $\ce{CaO}$ | 0.34-3.6, average 1.9 | 1.5-3.0 |
| $\ce{Na2O}$ | 3.1-6.2, average 4.7 | 4.0-5.5 |
| $\ce{K2O}$ | 0.03-1.4, average 0.77 | ~2.5, usually <2 |
