= Appalachia (disambiguation) =

Appalachia is a geo-cultural region located within the Appalachian Mountains in the eastern United States.

Appalachia may also refer to:

- Appalachian (disambiguation)
- Appalachia (Mesozoic), a Mesozoic-era island
- Appalachia, Virginia, a town in the U.S. state of Virginia
- Appalachia, a rhapsody by Frederick Delius
- Appalachia (journal), a mountaineering and conservation journal published by the Appalachian Mountain Club since 1894
- Appalachia (grasshopper), a genus of grasshopper from eastern North America

== See also ==
- Apalachin (disambiguation)
- Apalachin, New York
