= Harry von Eckermann =

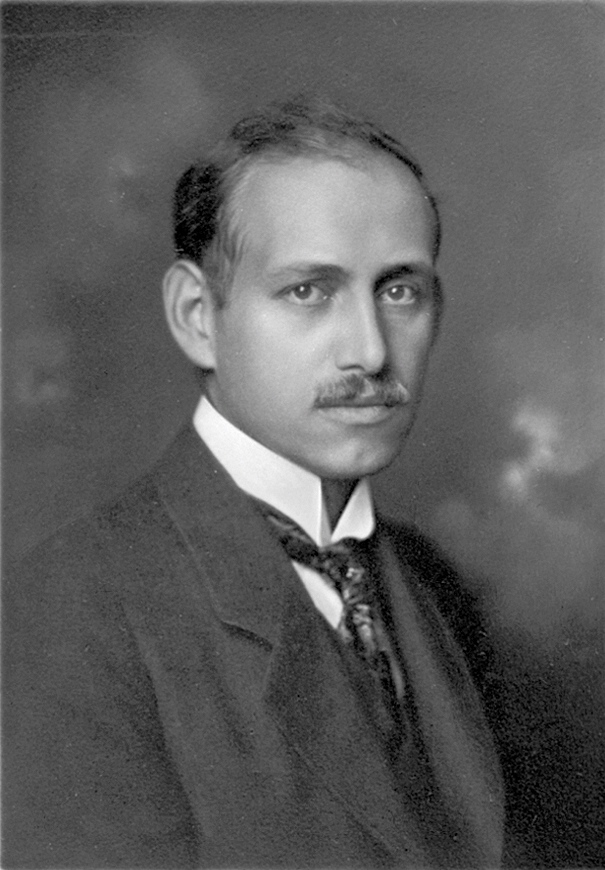
Harry von Eckermann, 1916

Harry von Eckermann (1886–1969) was a Swedish industrialist, mineralogist and geologist. His studies were centered around anorogenic alkaline igneous rocks occurring in the Baltic Shield. Following this line he studied the Alnö Complex, Norra Kärr Alkaline Complex and various Rapakivi granites.

In a 1948 publication on Alnö, von Eckermann correctly claimed a magmatic origin of carbonatite, albeit his finds were only widely accepted after the Ol Doinyo Lengai eruption of carbonatite lava in the 1960s showed contemporary evidence on the existence of such magmas. In relation to the mid-20th century granitization controversy von Eckermann rejected the notion that rapakivi granites were Jotnian sediments turned into granite.

== See also ==
- José María Sobral
- Pentti Eskola
