= Apalachin (disambiguation) =

Apalachin may refer to:

- Apalachin, New York
- Apalachin meeting, historic summit of the American Mafia in 1957
- Little Apalachin, famous mafia meeting in 1966, named after the larger meeting in 1957

== See also ==
- Appalachia (disambiguation)
