= Fenite =

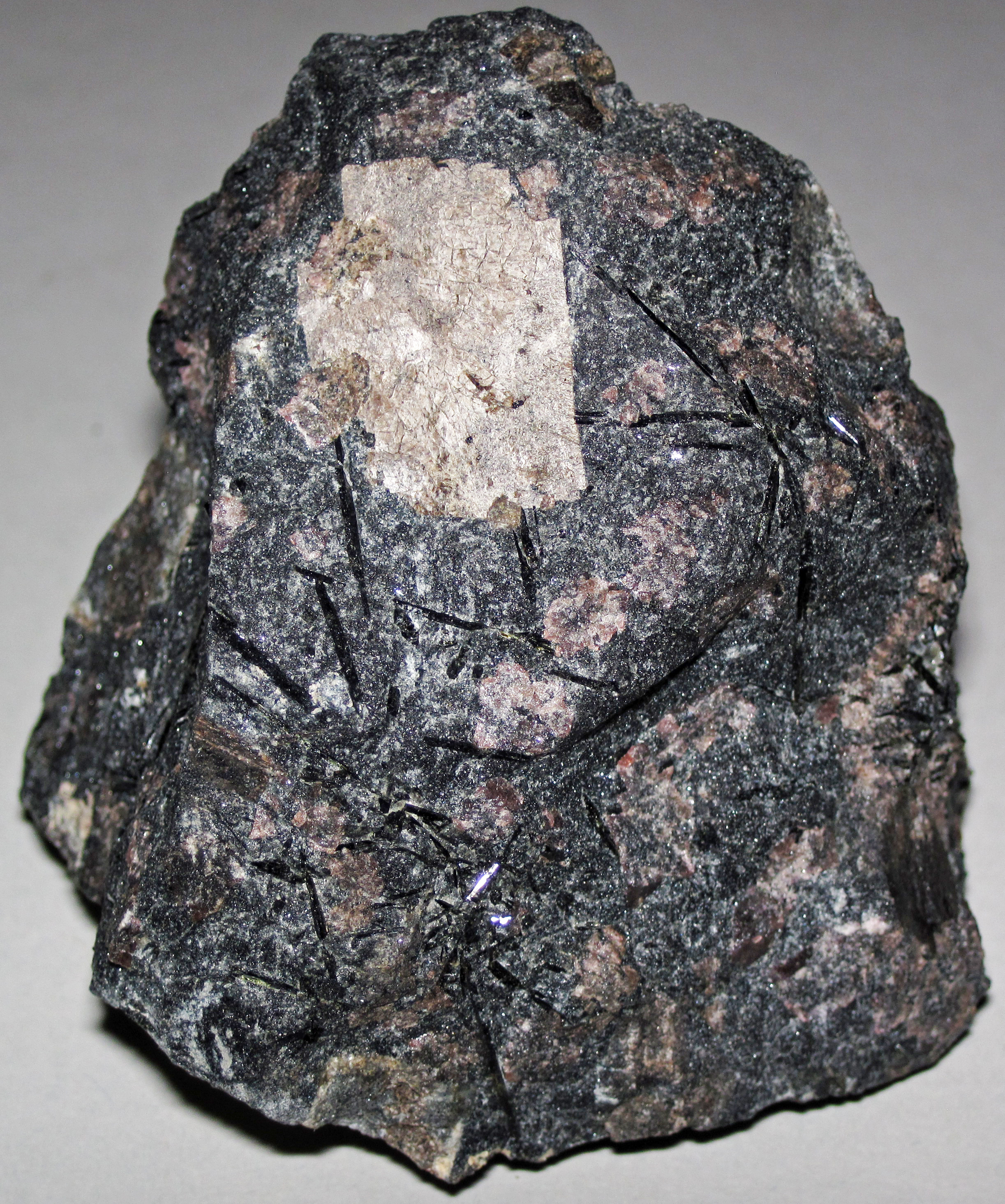
Fenite from Russia

Fenite is a metasomatic alteration associated particularly with carbonatite intrusions and created, very rarely, by advanced carbon dioxide alteration (carbonation) of felsic and mafic rocks. It is characterised by the presence of alkali feldspar, sodic pyroxene and sodic amphibole. Fenite alteration is known, but restricted in distribution, around high-temperature metamorphic talc carbonates, generally in the form of an aureole around ultramafic rocks. Such examples include biotite-rich zones, amphibolite-calcite-scapolite alteration and other unusual skarn assemblages. The process is called fenitization.

The type locality for fenite is the Fen Complex (Norwegian: Fensfeltet) in Nome Municipality in Telemark county, Norway.
