= Oslo Graben =

Inactive Permian geological rift in Norway

Coordinates: 59°48′04″N 10°33′23″E

The Oslo Graben or Oslo Rift is a graben formed during a geologic rifting event in Permian time, the last phase of the Variscan orogeny. The main graben forming period began in the late Carboniferous, which culminated with rift formation and volcanism, with associated rhomb porphyry lava flows. This activity was followed by uplifting, and ended with intrusions about 65 million years after the onset of the formation. It is located in the area around the Norwegian capital Oslo.

The lava production was high when the rhomb porphyry lavas were deposited. The lavas reflect a period of abundant earthquake-related movements, when tectonic forces tore the crust apart.

In the Vestfold district, one lava flow was deposited on average every 250,000 years, resulting in a 3000-metre thick sequence of mainly volcanic material. In the Oslo area, lavas were deposited on average every 800,000 years. Only a few plant remains have been found between these lavas. The bedrock in this area, roughly from Skien to Oslo and Mjøsa, results in soil rich in nutrients important for plant growth.

Since the Permian, erosion has removed the volcanic peaks and indeed most of the lava layer and laid bare the magma chambers and volcanic pipes deep below, allowing scientist a rare view of what goes on beneath a rift valley. This made it popular among early students of geology, among other Christian Leopold von Buch (1810). Several of the old magma plumes are now quarried, the rich black larvikite (named from Larvik, a town south of Oslo) being one.

The Särna alkaline complex in western Sweden, also of Late Carboniferous age, is thought to be related to the Oslo Graben as it is aligned to it.

== See also ==
- Kattsund-Koster dyke swarm – Large geological structure in Norway and Sweden
