= Long Range dikes =

Large geological structure in Canada

The Long Range dikes are a Neoproterozoic mafic dike swarm of Newfoundland and Labrador, Canada. It consists of a large igneous province with an area of 105,000 km^{2} (41,000 sq mi) that was constructed about 620 million years ago when Laurentia broke-up from Baltica. Its formation might have occurred when the ancient Iapetus Ocean began to open.

Long Range is the oldest of a series of magmatic events that occurred along the eastern margin of Laurentia 620–560 Ma, before the opening of the Iapetus Ocean. It can be linked to magmatism in Baltica, the basaltic dike swarm in Egersund, Norway, and Baltoscandian swarms. It was followed by the 590 Ma Grenville-Adirondack swarm, Upstate New York, associated with separation from Amazonia and the 563 Ma Sept Îles, Quebec, layered intrusions (coeval with the Catoctin large igneous province) associated with the break-up of the Dashwoods microcontinent of West Newfoundland.
