= Appalachian =

Appalachian may refer to:

- Appalachian Mountains, a major mountain range in eastern United States and Canada
- Appalachian Trail, a hiking trail in the eastern United States
- The people of Appalachia and their culture
  - Appalachian Americans, ethnic group native to Appalachia
  - Appalachian English, the variety of English native to Central and Southern Appalachia
  - Appalachian music
- Appalachian State University, in Boone, North Carolina

== See also ==
- Appalachia (disambiguation)
