= Syenite =

Intrusive igneous rock

- Igneous rock
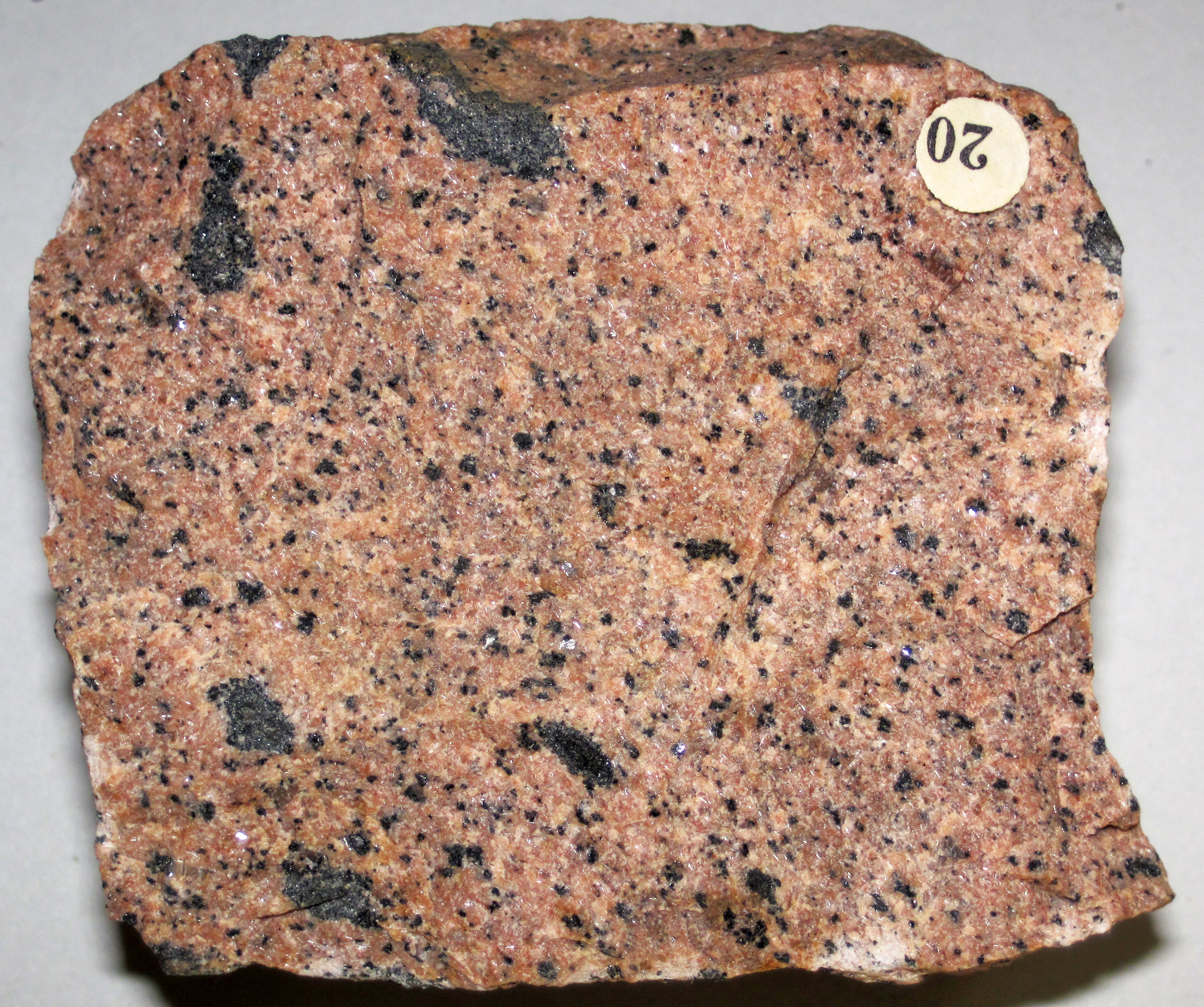

Composition
- Classification: Felsic
- Primary: Alkali feldspar
- Secondary: Plagioclase, quartz, or feldspathoid
- Texture: Phaneritic
- Equivalents: Trachyte extrusively

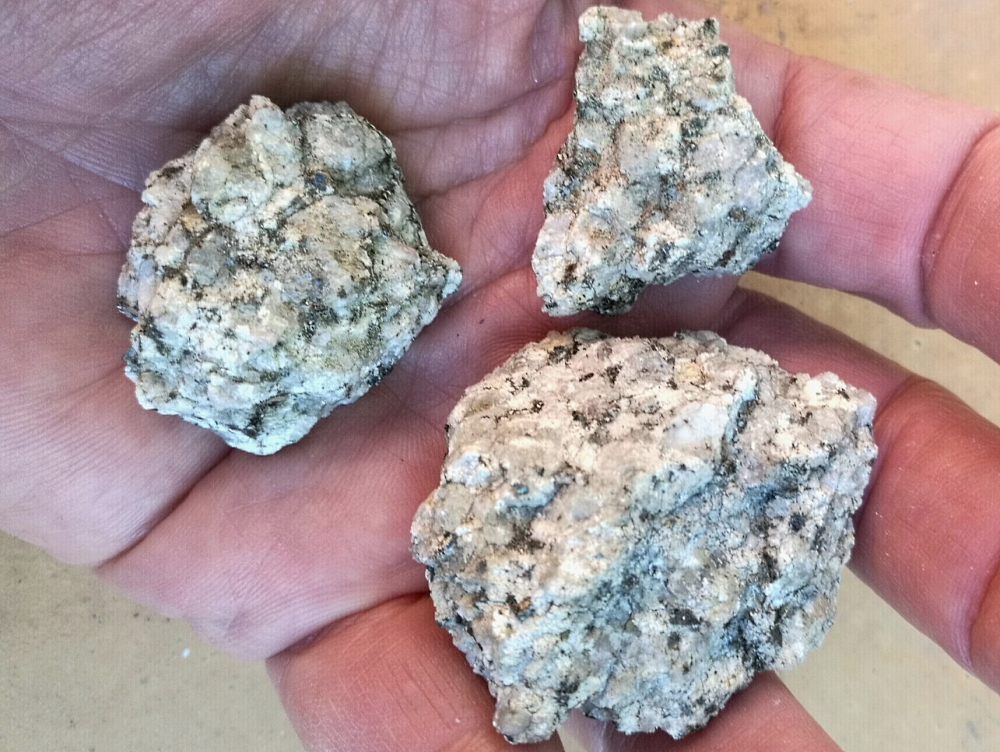
Syenite from Corsica

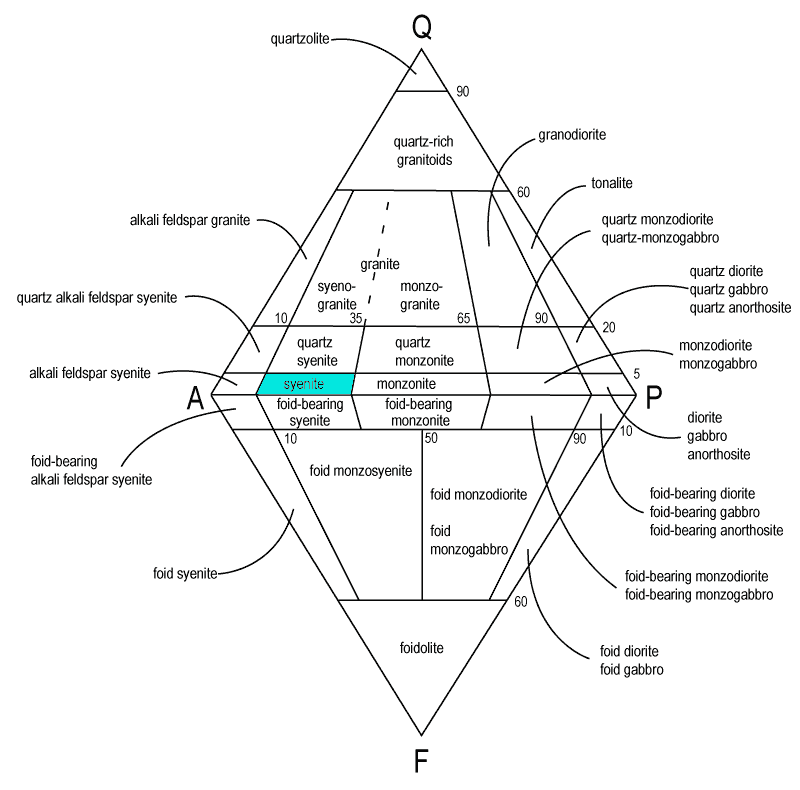
QAPF diagram that shows the quartz (Q), alkali feldspar (A), and plagioclase (P) composition of syenite

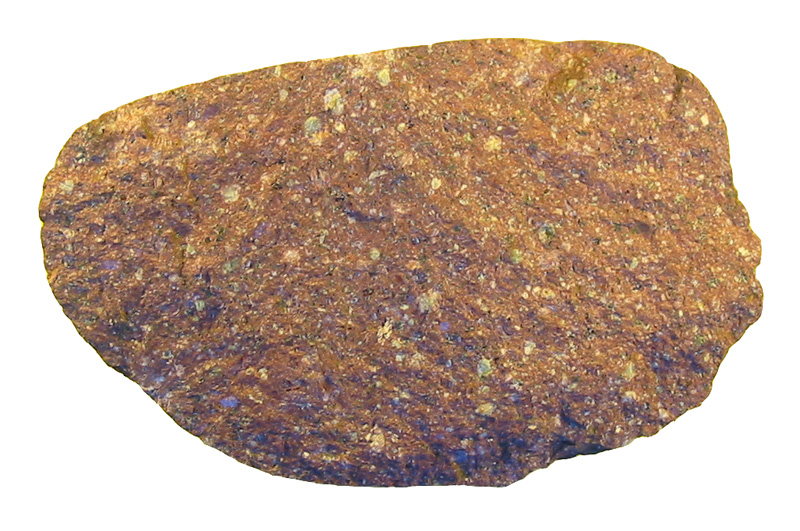
Leucocratic variety of nepheline syenite from Sweden (särnaite)

Syenite is a coarse-grained intrusive igneous rock with a general composition similar to that of granite, but deficient in quartz, which, if present at all, occurs in relatively small concentrations (< 5%). It is considered a granitoid. Some syenites contain larger proportions of mafic components and smaller amounts of felsic material than most granites; those are classed as being of intermediate composition.

The extrusive equivalent of syenite is trachyte.

== Composition ==
The feldspar component of syenite is predominantly alkaline in character (usually orthoclase). Plagioclase feldspars may be present in small proportions, between 10% and 35% of the feldspar content. Such feldspars often are interleaved as perthitic components of the rock.

When ferromagnesian minerals are present in syenite at all, they usually occur in the form of amphibole (typically hornblende) and clinopyroxene. Biotite is rare, because in a syenite magma the formation of feldspar consumes nearly all the aluminium. However less Al-rich phyllosilicates may be included, such as annite.

Other common accessory minerals are apatite, titanite, zircon and other opaques.

Most syenites are either peralkaline with high proportions of alkali elements relative to aluminum, or peraluminous with a higher concentration of aluminum relative to alkali (predominantly K and Na) and earth-alkali (predominantly Ca) elements.

== Formation ==
=== Partial melting ===
Syenites are products of alkaline igneous activity, generally formed in thick continental crustal areas, or in Cordilleran subduction zones. The formation of syenites can be theorized to be from the melt of granitic or igneous protolith to a fairly low degree of partial melting. This is required because potassium is an incompatible element and tends to enter a melt first, whereas higher degrees of partial melting will liberate more calcium and sodium, which produce plagioclase, and hence a granite, granodiorite or tonalite.

At very low degrees of partial melting a silica undersaturated melt is produced, forming a nepheline syenite, where orthoclase is replaced by a feldspathoid such as leucite, nepheline or analcime.

Conversely in certain conditions, large volumes of anorthite crystals may precipitate from thoroughly molten magma in a cumulate process as it cools. This leaves a drastically reduced concentration of silica in the remainder of the melt. The segregation of the silica from the melt leaves it in a state that may favour syenite formation.

=== Fractional crystallization ===
Some syenites are also theorized to be the product of the fractional crystallization of basaltic magmas.

== Occurrence ==
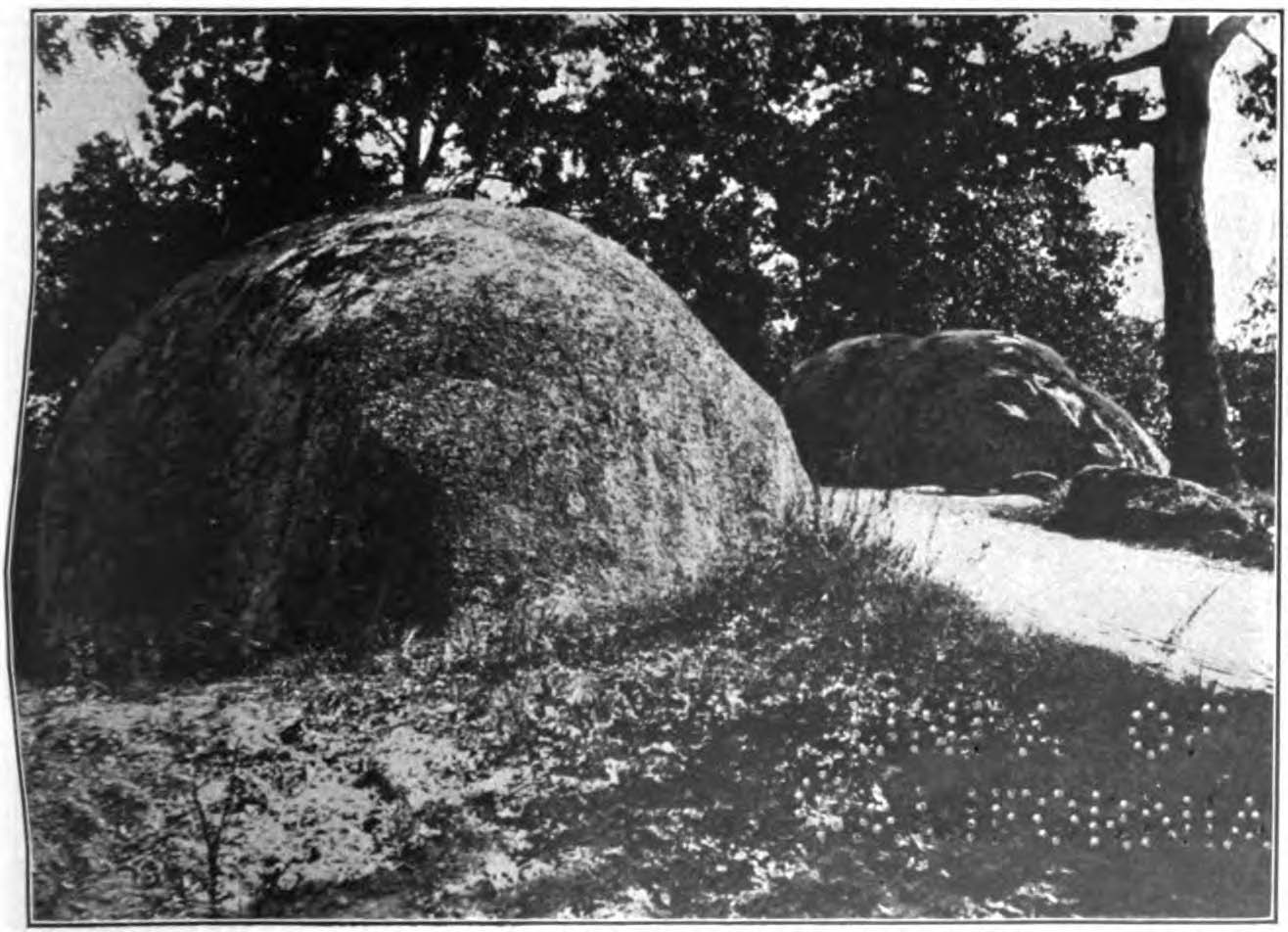
Boulders of syenite near Concord, North Carolina, c. 1910

Syenite is not a common rock. Regions where it occurs in significant quantities include the following:

- In the Kola Peninsula of Russia two giant nepheline syenite bodies exists making up the Lovozero Massif and the Khibiny Mountains. These syenites are part of the Kola Alkaline Province.
- In North America syenite occurs in Arkansas and Montana. Regions in New England have sizable amounts, and in New York syenite gneisses occur. The "great syenite dyke" extends from Hanging Rock, South Carolina, through Taxahaw, South Carolina, to the Brewer and Edgeworth mine in Chesterfield, South Carolina. Syenite pebbles, containing fluorescent sodalite, were moved from Canada to Michigan by glaciers; these glacial erratic pebbles have been given the trade name "yooperlite". In other parts of the world, these types of rocks are known as sodalite-syenite and occur in Canada, India, other US states, Greenland, Malawi, and Russia.
- In Europe syenite may be found in parts of Switzerland, Germany, Norway, Portugal, Sweden, Scotland, in Plovdiv, Bulgaria and in Ditrău, Romania.
- In Africa there are syenite formations in Aswan, Egypt, and in Malawi in the Mulanje Mountain Forest Reserve. Syenite rock was used to make the Quay with Sphinxes.
- In Australia syenite occurs as small intrusive bodies in nearly every state. In New South Wales, a large syenite intruded during the breakup of Gondwana in the Cretaceous.
- Paatusoq and Kangerluluk fjords in southeastern Greenland, where a bay within the latter (Syenitbugt) and a headland (Syenitnæs) are named after the rock.

== Etymology ==
The term syenite was originally applied to hornblende granite like that of Syene (now Aswan) in Egypt, from which the name is derived.

== Episyenite ==
Episyenite (or epi-syenite) is a term used in petrology to describe veins, pods, or lenses of rock originally rich in silicon dioxide (SiO_{2}) from which quartz has been severely depleted. This is often accompanied by strong enrichment in potassium and rare earth elements, leaving the altered rock a distinctive brick red color, or by albitization (enrichment in sodium), leaving the altered rock a conspicuous white color.

Episyenites are heterogenous in their properties, but all have experienced nearly complete disappearance of quartz at sub-solidus temperatures; that is, at temperatures below the melting point of the host rock. The formation of episyenites (episyenitization) typically takes place through leaching of quartz by mildly saline hydrothermal fluids, typically near a cooling intrusion. Because episyenitization usually takes place in granitoid rock and usually involves alkaline metasomatism (addition of alkali metal oxides to the rock) the result is a rock that has the mineral composition of an igneous syenite.

In addition to rare earth elements, episyenites may be important sources of uranium and other valuable metals.

Notable occurrences of episyenite are found in the Central Iberian Massif of Spain, in Cambrian to Ordovician beds of New Mexico and Colorado, Scandinavia, Brazil, and Ukraine.

== See also ==
- List of rock types
