= Bronson Hill Arc =

Bimodal volcanic arc and associated Ordovician sediments

The Bronson Hill Arc is a bimodal volcanic arc and associated sediments that formed over a west-dipping subduction zone during the Ordovician period (c. 475 - 450 million years ago (Ma)) as part of the Taconic orogeny. These rocks are presently well exposed along the Connecticut River valley of Vermont and New Hampshire. The arc is evidenced by plutonism and extrusive volcanism, including the Ammonoosuc Volcanics (c. 461 Ma from U/Pb zircon dates) and the overlying Partridge Formation (c. 457 Ma from graptolites in the formation). It is related to the slightly older Shelburne Falls arc that lies to the west. These rocks were metamorphosed and deformed during the Acadian Orogeny and the Alleghenian Orogeny.
