= Iapetus Ocean =

Ocean that existed in the late Neoproterozoic and early Paleozoic eras

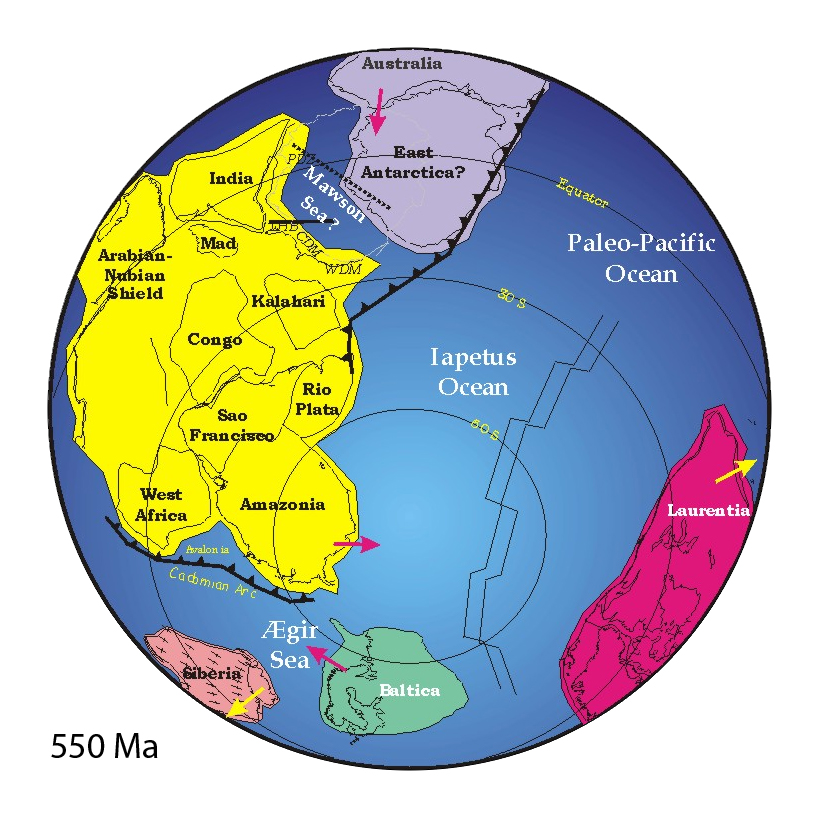
Reconstruction of how the Iapetus Ocean and surrounding continents might have been arranged during the late Ediacaran period

The Iapetus Ocean (/aɪˈæpɪtəs/; eye-AP-ih-təs) existed in the late Neoproterozoic and early Paleozoic eras of the geologic timescale (between 600 and 425 million years ago). It was in the Southern Hemisphere, between the paleocontinents of Laurentia, Baltica and Avalonia. The ocean disappeared with the Acadian, Caledonian and Taconic orogenies, when these three continents joined to form one big landmass called Euramerica. The "southern" Iapetus Ocean has been proposed to have closed with the Famatinian and Taconic orogenies, meaning a collision between western Gondwana and Laurentia.

Because the Iapetus Ocean was positioned between continental masses that would at a much later time roughly form the opposite shores of the Atlantic Ocean, it can be seen as a sort of precursor of the Atlantic, and the process by which it opened shares many similarities with that of the Atlantic's initial opening in the Jurassic. The Iapetus Ocean was therefore named for the titan Iapetus, who in Greek mythology was the father of Atlas, after whom the Atlantic Ocean was named. (Note: The name Iapetus was first used by Harland & Gayer 1972, before that the ocean was referred to as the Proto-Atlantic.)

== Research history ==
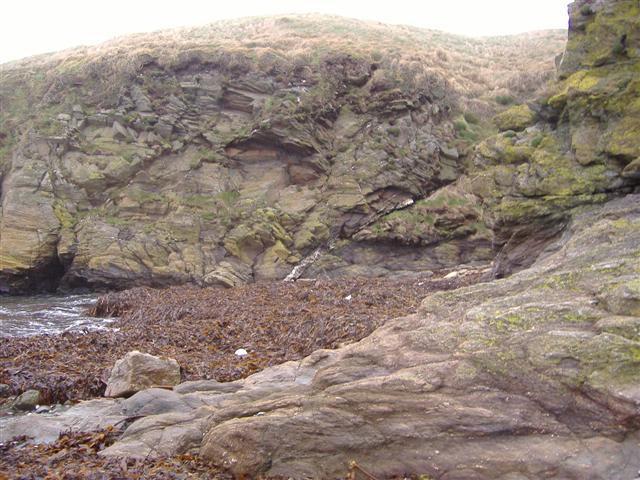
Geological fault at Niarbyl. The narrow white diagonal line near centre of picture is where the two sides of the Iapetus Ocean met during its closure. Sutures such as these are the modern evidence for this ancient ocean.

At the start of the 20th century, American paleontologist Charles Walcott noticed differences in early Paleozoic benthic trilobites of Laurentia (such as Olenellidae, the so-called "Pacific fauna"), as found in Scotland and western Newfoundland, and those of Baltica (such as Paradoxididae, often called the "Atlantic fauna"), as found in the southern parts of the British Isles and eastern Newfoundland. Geologists of the early 20th century presumed that a large trough, a so-called geosyncline, had existed between Scotland and England in the early Paleozoic, keeping the two sides separated.

With the development of plate tectonics in the 1960s, geologists such as Arthur Holmes and John Tuzo Wilson concluded that the Atlantic Ocean must have had a precursor before the time of Pangaea. Wilson also noticed that the Atlantic had opened at roughly the same place where its precursor ocean had closed. This led him to his Wilson Cycle hypothesis.

== Geodynamic history ==
=== Neoproterozoic origin ===
The birth of the Iapetus Ocean came from the breakup of the supercontinent Rodinia. After its formation ~1100 Ma, extension and eventual supercontinent break-up began ~760 Ma. Much like the later supercontinent Pangea, super continental break up is thought to have been caused by subduction zones lining Rodinia's margins. This process shuts off the mantle region in the center, which causes extensional stresses to localize at old suture zones.This theory also includes that mantle plumes are not necessary for continental break up. The Iapetus did not open all at once. It was a gradual poly phase opening which played out between 750 Ma and 520 Ma. Over that time, the Iapetus slowly widened, creating a brand-new ocean basin.

In many spots in Scandinavia basaltic dikes are found with ages between 670 and 650 million years. These are interpreted as evidence that by that time, rifting had started that would form the Iapetus Ocean. In Newfoundland and Labrador, the Long Range dikes are also thought to have formed during the formation of the Iapetus Ocean. It has been proposed that both the Fen Complex in Norway and the Alnö Complex in Sweden formed as consequence to mild extensional tectonics in the ancient continent of Baltica that followed the opening of the Iapetus Ocean.

The eastern Iapetus Ocean is believed to have opened around 590 Ma with the emplacement of the Central Iapetus Magmatic Province between Laurentia and Baltica. The southern Iapetus Ocean opened between Laurentia and southwestern Gondwana (now South America) about 550 Ma, close to the end of the Ediacaran period. At the time it did so the Adamastor Ocean further east closed. The opening of the Iapetus Ocean probably postdates the opening of the Puncoviscana Ocean, which is believed to have opened around 700 Ma as Laurentia drifted away from Amazonia, with the Iapetus Ocean being separated from the Puncoviscana Ocean by the ribbon-shaped Arequipa-Antofalla terrane. However, the formation of both oceans seems unrelated.

=== Paleozoic ===
Position of the continents after the Caledonian orogeny (Devonian to Permian times). Differences in fossil faunas on both sides of the red line (the Iapetus Suture) are evidence for the existence of an ocean between the two sides in the time before the continents were joined in the supercontinent Pangaea.

Southwest of the Iapetus, a volcanic island arc evolved from the early Cambrian (540 million years ago) onward. This volcanic arc was formed above a subduction zone where the oceanic lithosphere of the Iapetus Ocean subducted southward under other oceanic lithosphere. From Cambrian times (about 540 million years ago) the western Iapetus Ocean began to grow progressively narrower due to this subduction. The same happened further north and east, where Avalonia and Baltica began to move towards Laurentia from the Ordovician (488–444 million years ago) onward.

Trilobite faunas of the continental shelves of Baltica and Laurentia are still very different in the Ordovician, but Silurian faunas show progressive mixing of species from both sides, because the continents moved closer together.

In the west, the Iapetus Ocean closed with the Taconic orogeny (480–430 million years ago), when the volcanic island arc collided with Laurentia. Some authors consider the oceanic basin south of the island arc also a part of the Iapetus, this branch closed during the later Acadian orogeny, when Avalonia collided with Laurentia.

It has been suggested that the southern Iapetus Ocean closed during a continental collision between Laurentia and western Gondwana (South America). If factual the Taconic orogen would be the northward continuation of the Famatinian orogen exposed in Argentina. (Note: In other words, what is at present the northern end of the Famatinian orogen would have been connected with what is currently the southern end of the Taconic orogen.)

Meanwhile, the eastern parts had closed too: the Tornquist Sea between Avalonia and Baltica already during the late Ordovician, the main branch between Baltica–Avalonia and Laurentia during the Grampian and Scandian phases of the Caledonian orogeny (440–420 million years ago).

At the end of the Silurian period (about 420 million years ago) the Iapetus Ocean had completely disappeared and the combined mass of the three continents formed the "new" continent of Laurasia, which would itself be the northern component of the singular supercontinent of Pangaea.

== See also ==
- Avalonia – Microcontinent in the Paleozoic era
- Baltica – Late-Proterozoic to early-Palaeozoic continent
- Central Iapetus Magmatic Province
- Geologic timescale – System that relates geologic strata to time
- Khanty Ocean – Small Precambrian ocean between Baltica and the Siberian continent
- List of ancient oceans – List of Earth's former oceans
- London–Brabant Massif – Ancient basement stretching from Rhineland to East Anglia
- Plate tectonics – Movement of Earth's lithosphere
- Southern uplands of Scotland – Southernmost and least populous region of Scotland
- Ammonoosuc Volcanics – A metamorphosed rock unit that formed during the closure of the Iapetus Ocean
