= Alnö Complex =

The Alnö Complex or Alnö Alkaline Complex is a group of carbonatite and alkaline igneous rocks in Alnö in the eastern coast of central Sweden that intruded the basement in Late Ediacaran times. The Alnö Complex is made up by a series of concentric dykes within a radius of 25 km of a main "central complex" of intrusions. In addition the Alnö Complex proper is surrounded by a 500 to 600 m broad zone of metasomatic rock that was formed by metasomatic alteration of the existing Precambrian migmatite gneiss basement. The specific type of metasomatic rock is referred by some authors as "fenite". The dykes of the complex consist of carbonatite and alkaline rocks such melilite and sövite.

It has been proposed that both the Fen Complex in Southern Norway and the Alnö Complex formed as consequence to mild extensional tectonics in the ancient continent of Baltica following the opening of the Iapetus Ocean.

Harry von Eckermann published a landmark study on the Alnö Complex in 1948 correctly claiming a magmatic origin of carbonatite, albeit his finds were only widely accepted after the Ol Doinyo Lengai eruption of carbonatite lava in the 1960s showed contemporary evidence on the existence of such magmas.

As result of decreased foreign trade during World War II apatite was mined from the carbonates of Alnö Complex from 1943 to 1945. Apatite was separated by flotation but results were meager. While the separation process had improved in 1945 the end of the war the same year meant that apatite mining became unprofitable.
