= Norra Kärr =

Coordinates: 58.102°N 14.565°E

Norra Kärr or Norra Kärr Alkaline Complex is an intrusive complex cropping out at the boundary between Östergötland and Småland, Sweden. The complex is chiefly made up of peralkaline nepheline syenite and is rich in exotic minerals. Rocks of the complex intruded into the Paleoproterozoic-aged Växjo granites of the Transscandinavian Igneous Belt. Alfred Elis Törnebohm was the first to describe the rocks of Norra Kärr in 1906. Norra Kärr was discovered a few years earlier during regional geological mapping by the Swedish Geological Survey. The complex derives its name from a local farm, which translates into English as "Northern Fen". In 1968 Harry von Eckermann published his investigations on the complex defining its boundaries and confirming the view of it as an intrusion.

A study has shown that the elevated rare-earth element concentrations in the bedrock in the Norra Kärr area are particularly well reflected in high contents of these elements in the fern Dryopteris filix-mas. This raises the possibility for the fern species to be used in biogeochemical prospecting.

Norra Kärr is one of the two known sites where the mineral jinshajiangite can be found naturally, the other being in China.

== Mine project ==
Norra Kärr mine
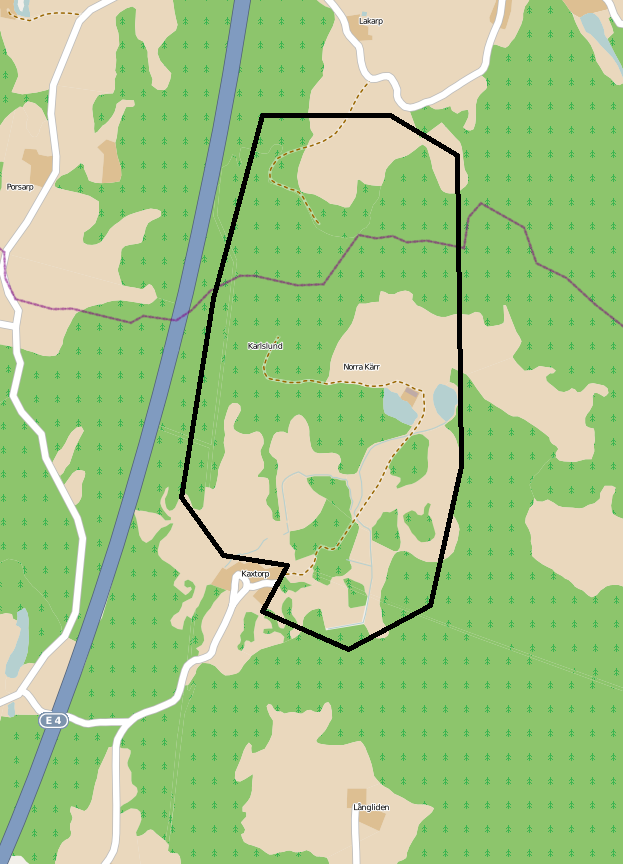
- Interactive map of Norra Kärr mine
- Location: Jönköping County, Sweden
- Products: Rare earth elements and Zirconium

The Norra Kärr mine project represents one of the largest zirconium reserves in Sweden having estimated reserves of 58 million tonnes of ore grading 1.7% zirconium metal.

Since 2009, the Canadian company Tasman Metals has owned the mining rights and explored for rare earth elements in the Norra Kärr area.

In February 2016 the supreme administrative court of Sweden withdrew Tasman's exploitation concession for Norra Kärr.
