= Ol Doinyo Lengai =

Active volcano in Arusha Region, Tanzania

- Oldoinyo Lengai
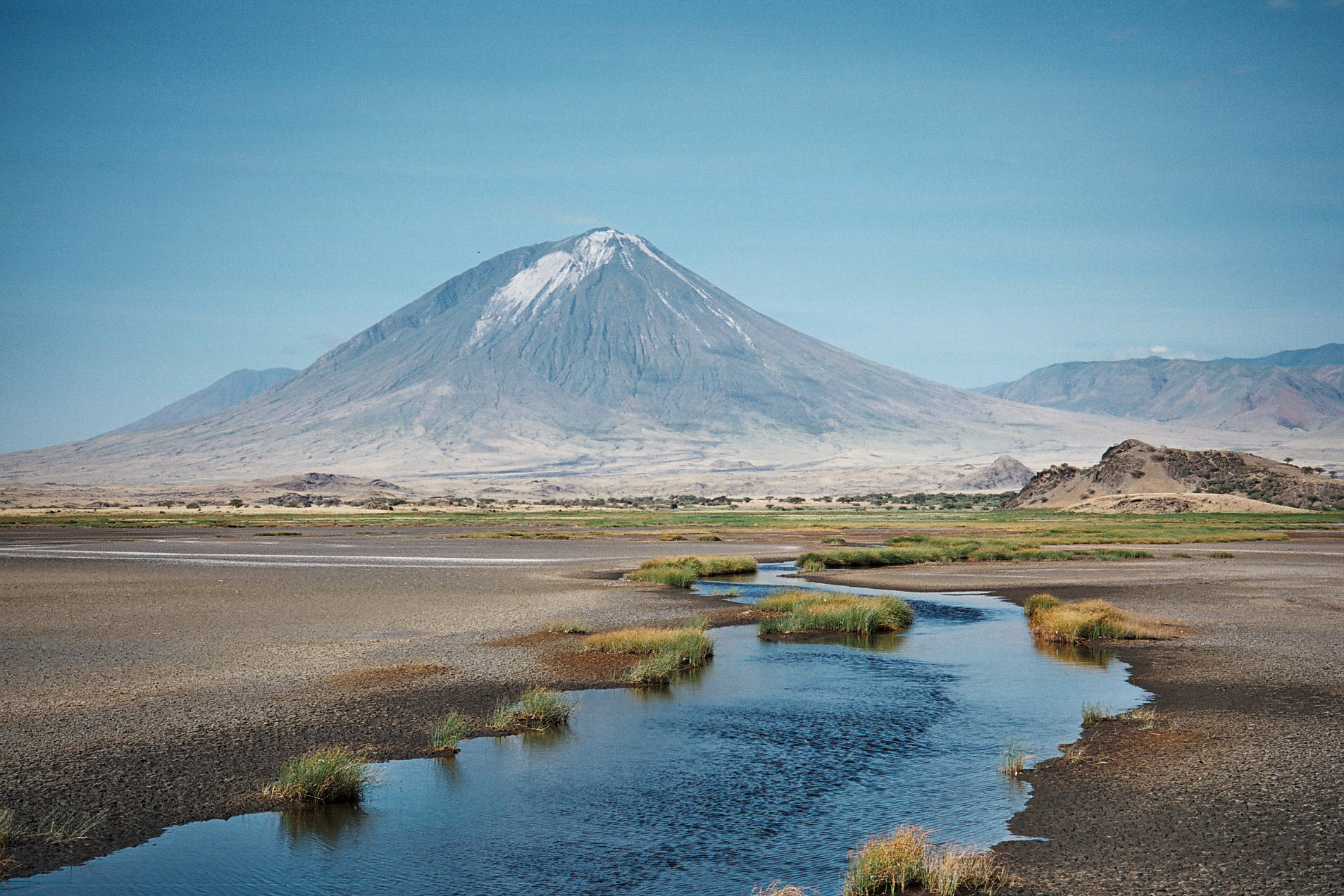

Highest point
- Elevation: 2,962 m (9,718 ft)
- Prominence: 1,360 m (4,460 ft)
- Isolation: 16.68 km (10.36 mi)
- Coordinates: 2.764°S 35.914°E

Geography
- Location within Tanzania
- Location: Tanzania

Geology
- Formed by: Volcanism along the Gregory Rift
- Mountain type: Stratovolcano
- Last eruption: 2024

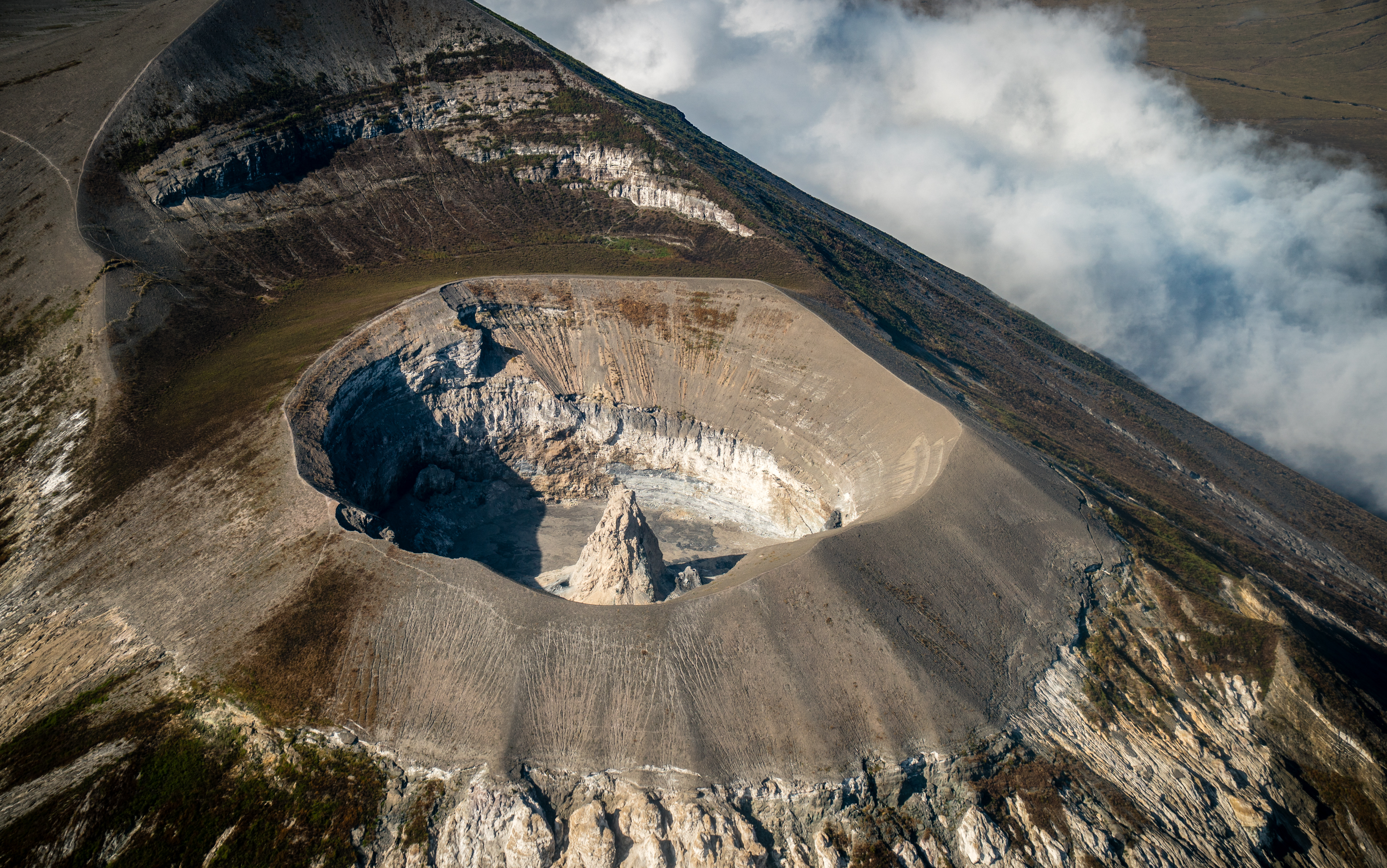
Mount Ol Doinyo Lengai from above in Aug 2021

Ol Doinyo Lengai is an active stratovolcano in northern Tanzania. It consists of a volcanic cone with two craters, the northern of which has erupted during historical time. Uniquely for volcanoes on Earth, it has erupted natrocarbonatite, an unusually low temperature and highly fluid type of magma. Eruptions in 2007–2008 affected the surrounding region.

== Name ==
The Maasai and Sonjo people refer to the volcano as "The Mountain of God", associated with a myth of the abode of the god Engai, who withdrew there after being hit with an arrow by a hunter. Other names are Basanjo, Donjo Ngai, Duenjo Ngai, Mongogogura, Mungogo wa Bogwe, and Oldonyo L'Engai.

== Geography and geomorphology ==
Ol Doinyo Lengai lies in the Arusha Region of Tanzania, 16 kilometres (9.9 mi) south of Lake Natron and 120 kilometres (75 mi) northwest of Arusha. The summit was first explored between 1904 and 1915. As of 2012, about 300,000 people live in the region, and livestock farming is the most important economic activity, although tourism is increasingly important.

Ol Doinyo Lengai is a symmetric cone that rises more than 1,800 metres (5,900 ft) above the surrounding rift valley. It has two craters on either side of the summit, which is formed by a 110-metre (360-foot) high ridge. The floor of the northern crater is covered with lava flows that resemble pahoehoe lavas. Small cones (Note: Known as hornitos.) with sizes ranging from 2 metres (6 ft 7 in) to over 10 metres (33 ft) occur in the crater and produce lava flows from their summits and, when they collapse, from their flanks. The southern crater is inactive and sometimes filled with water. White volcanic ash deposits cover the slopes of the volcano, which have large fractures on the western flank. There are parasitic vents on the flanks, such as Kirurum Crater on the western, the Nasira cones on the northern, Dorobo crater on the northeastern, and Oltatwa Crater on the eastern flank.

There are deposits of past debris avalanches around the volcano, especially on its northern flank; one such event has left a scar on the volcano's flanks. Their occurrence may have been influenced by regional fault systems.

== Geology ==
Ol Doinyo Lengai is part of the Gregory Rift, which is part of the active East African Rift—a continental rift extending from eastern to southern Africa over a length of 4,000 kilometres (2,500 mi), where there is high heat flow through a thinner crust. The Gregory Rift began spreading began about 1.2 million years ago and is ongoing at a rate of about 3 millimetres per year (0.12 in/year). The Natron Fault, the western boundary of the Gregory Rift, passes just southwest of the volcano.

The volcano is part of the Ngorongoro volcanic highland, a system of volcanoes that were active from the Miocene to present and which includes the Ngorongoro and other volcanoes. Over time, volcanic activity shifted northeastward to the present-day Ol Doinyo Lengai. Other volcanoes in the area are Gelai to the northeast (Note: The Naibor Soito monogenetic volcanic field lies between Gelai and Ol Doinyo Lengai.) and Ketumbeine southeast of Ol Doinyo Lengai; further away are the Olduvai Gorge to the west and Kilimanjaro to the east.

=== Composition ===
Most of the volcanic cone is formed by melilite, nephelinite, and phonolite. (Note: Together they make up more than 90% of the cone.) Ol Doinyo Lengai is the only volcano on Earth known to have erupted carbonatitic lavas (Note: Carbonatites are magmas that consist of carbonate compounds. At Ol Doinyo Lengai, they are made up of nyerereite (Na_{2}Ca(CO_{3})_{2}) and gregoryite ((Na_{,}K_{,}Ca)_{2}CO_{3}).) during historical times, although these rocks make up only a small fraction of the volcano and only occur in the northern crater; (Note: Silicic lavas mostly issued from the southern crater.) they only recently appeared on the volcano. The properties of Ol Doinyo Lengai's magmas have been used as an analogue for the conditions on carbon planets; these are planets which are rich in carbon.

- The carbonatites contain a groundmass of fluorite and sylvite, while apatite, galena, magnetite, monticellite, sellaite, and sphalerite form accessory components.
- The silicic lavas contain combeite, ijolites, melanite, nepheline, phlogopite, and pyroxene, as well as apatite, garnet, sphene, and wollastonite.
- Xenoliths from the basement have been found and consist of gneiss and other metamorphic rocks, as well as ijolites, pyroxenites, and urtites.

The carbonatite lavas are rapidly chemically modified by rainfall or covered by deposits condensing from fumarolic gases, yielding secondary minerals like calcite, gaylussite, nahcolite, pirssonite, shortite, thermonatrite, and trona, including various chlorides, fluorides, (Note: The volcanic rocks contain up to several percent chlorine and fluorine by weight.) and sulfates. These rocks form crusts on the lava flows and within lava tubes. Weathering on the silicic rocks has yielded zeoliths.

The chemical composition of the erupted rocks is not steady, with an increase of silicic magma emplacement noted after 2007–2008, after an episode of increased spreading in the Gregory Rift. The carbonatitic magmas appear to form through the separation of carbon-rich phases; the original magma is variously interpreted to be either nephelinitic or silicic. The phonolites appear to have a separate origin from the other volcanic rocks. There appear to be two magma reservoirs under the volcano, and its plumbing system is complex, involving regional tectonic structures.

==== Volcanic gases ====
Volcanic gas sampled at Ol Doinyo Lengai consists mostly of water vapour and carbon dioxide and originates in the mantle. The volcano is a major source of volcanic carbon dioxide, producing about 80 kilograms per second (11,000 lb/min) of CO_{2}.

== Eruption history ==
Radiometric dates obtained by geologists for the start of volcanic eruptions at Ol Doinyo Lengai range from more than 500,000 to 22,000 years ago. It formed in two stages, Lengai I consisting of phonolite that forms about 60% of the volume of Ol Doinyo Lengai and crops out in its southern part, and Lengai II formed by nephelinitic rocks; growth of the volcanic cone was complete about 15,000 years ago, when the Naisiusiu Beds were emplaced in the Olduvai Gorge. The volcano collapsed several times, including once between 850,000 and 135,000 years ago and another time between 50,000 and 10,000 years ago. The oldest natrocarbonatite lavas date to 1,250 years BP. An eruption 3,000-2,500 years BP produced a tephra fallout west of Ol Doinyo Lengai that is presently being eroded by wind and forming dunes including the "shifting sands" near the Olduvai Gorge. A large eruption deposited the Namorod Ash in the gorge, about 1,250 years BP and an eruption about 600 years BP formed the so-called "Footprint Tuff".

Ol Doinyo Lengai is the only presently active volcano of the Gregory Rift. Records of eruptions go back to the 1880s. (Note: Eruptions have been recorded in 1880, 1894 (?), 1904, 1913-15, 1917, 1921, 1926, 1940-41, 1954-55, 1958, and 1960.) The volcano is continually active, but there are seldom observations of its activity. It erupts tephra and lava flows from within the northern crater. During the middle 20th century, the crater was about 200 metres (660 ft) deep; subsequent lava flows filled it, and by 1998 lava was overflowing its rims. The lava flows issue from cones within the crater and form lava lakes. Explosive eruptions are less common, having been reported in 1917, 1940, 1966, (Note: 1966 saw explosive eruptions in August and October, which formed a deep crater.) 1983 and 1993. Unstable slopes produce landslides, and erosion has cut gullies into volcanic deposits. Steam jets have also been observed.

There is evidence of underground magma intrusions. Satellite observations have shown deformation of the volcano during eruptions, and ground-based observations have identified movement in neighbouring fault systems such as the Natron Fault caused by magma originating at Ol Doinyo Lengai.

=== Recent eruptive period: 1983 and subsequent ===
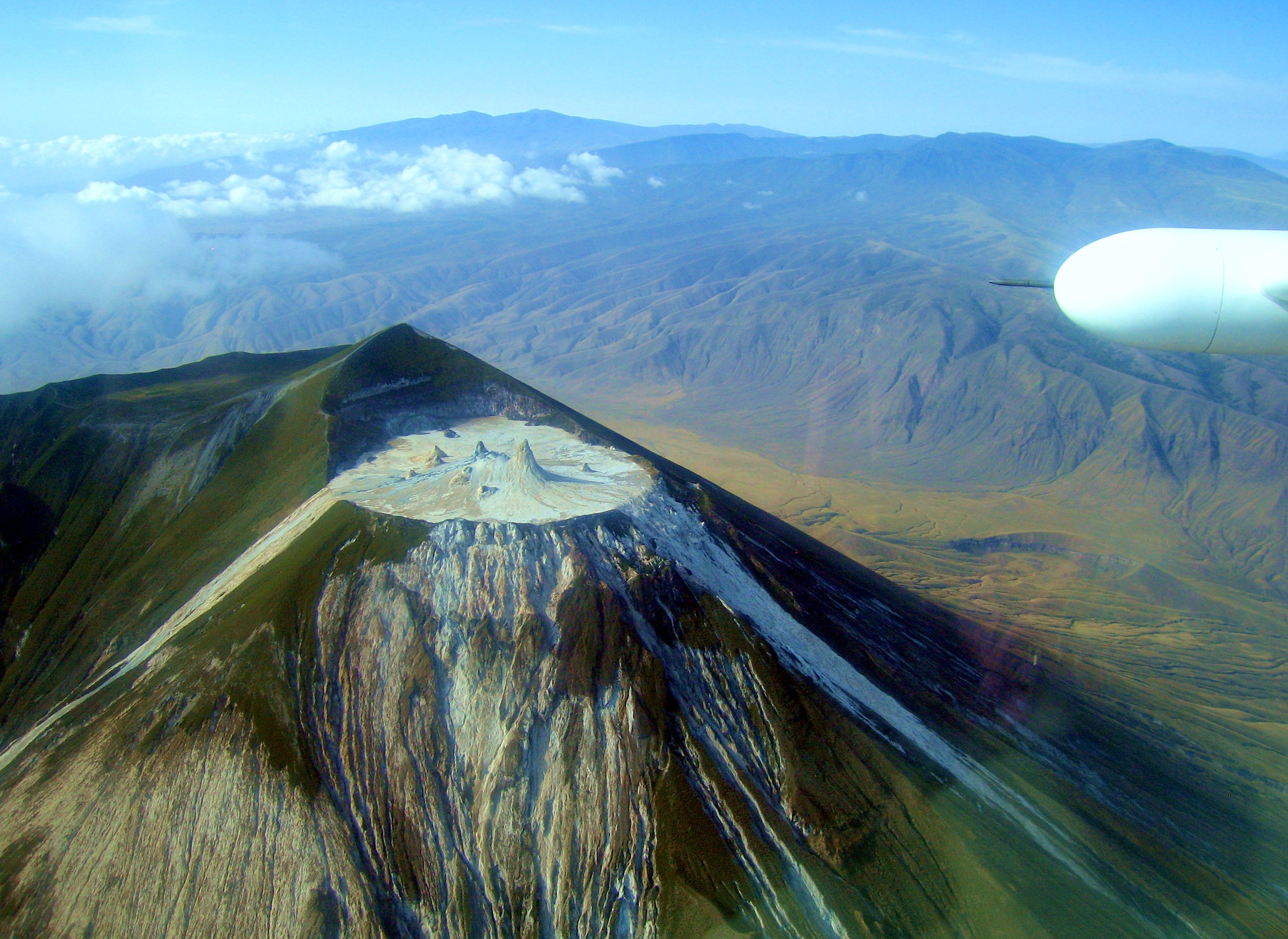
Summit of Ol Doinyo Lengai in February, 2006

After a phase of quiescence, renewed activity commenced in 1983 and continues with several interruptions to this day. During the 1983 eruption, ashfall occurred at tens of kilometers from the volcano. Following this eruption, lava effusion began within the summit crater. The ongoing state of the crater through the 1980s was documented by the geographer Celia Nyamweru, who lived nearby. The emission of a lava flow onto the western flank in 2006 was accompanied by the formation of a pit crater on the summit.

A large explosive eruption began on 4 September 2007, producing a 3-kilometre (1.9 mi)-high eruption column and a new crater 100 metres (330 ft) deep and 300 metres (980 ft) wide. The explosive activity continued into 2008, when the volcano settled back into the effusion of lava flows; a cinder cone formed in the northern crater during the eruption. Aerosol clouds from the eruption extended over East Africa. The 2007 eruptions forced the evacuation of three villages and disturbed air travel in the area; livestock fatalities and injuries to people led to requests that the government of Tanzania enact access restrictions to the volcano and to increased awareness of the threat formed by the volcano. Wild animals such as flamingos were also impacted by the eruption. The eruption was preceded in July 2007 by seismic activity, which was frequently mistaken for renewed eruptions, and the intrusion of a dyke less than 20 kilometres (12 mi) from Ol Doinyo Lengai.

=== General appearance of lava flows ===
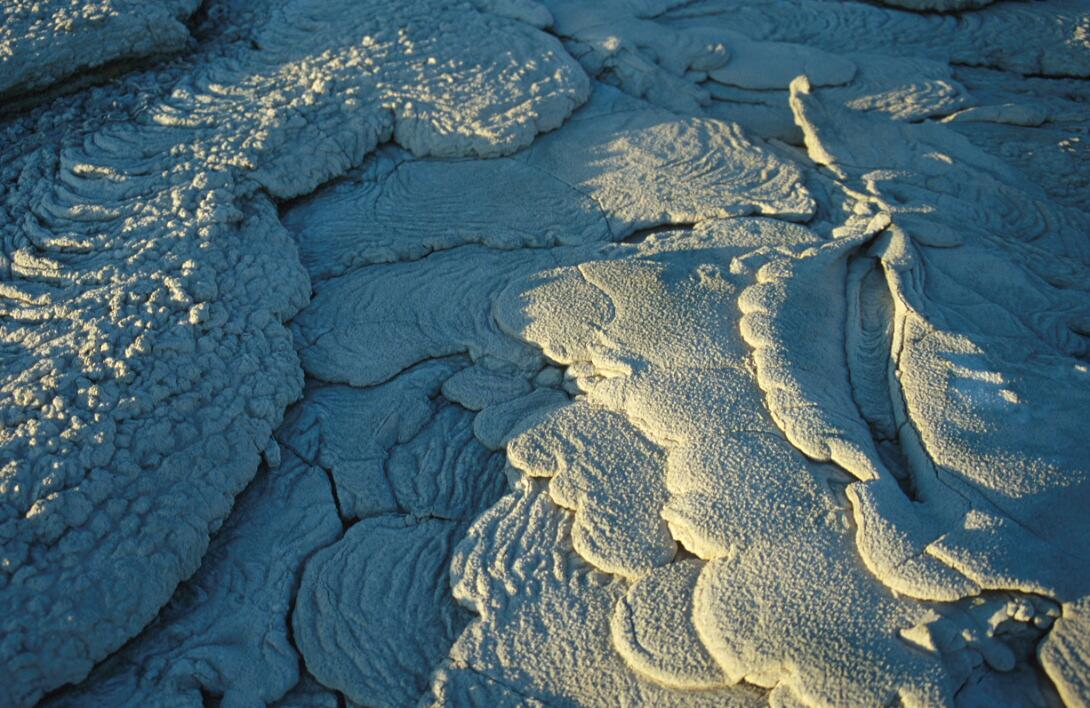
White surface of solidified lava flows at Ol Doinyo Lengai, August 2001

Lavas initially have brown or black colors, but within days to hours they become white like snow. The lavas have temperatures of 540–593 °C (1,004–1,099 °F); they are so cold that during the day they look like mudflows (Note: And have been confused for mud by non-volcanologists.) or oil and glow only during the night. They are highly fluid (reaching flow speeds of 1–5 metres per second (3.3–16.4 ft/s), making them the least viscous of all known lavas, and form short (few tens of meters) and thin (few centimeters thick) lava flows. More viscous flows containing silicic rocks have been observed, for example during the 1993 eruption.

=== Hazards ===
Potential threats from eruptions are scarcely established. Threats include lahars, landslides, lava flows, pyroclastic flows, volcanic bombs, volcanic gas, and volcanic ash fall. Beginning in 2016, the volcano is being monitored by a seismometer and GNSS stations.

== Climate and vegetation ==
Vegetation in the area consists mostly of grassland, which reaches an elevation of 1,750 metres (5,740 ft) above sea level. Volcanic ash from Ol Doinyo Lengai influences the surrounding landscape, favoring the growth of nutrient-rich plants. Precipitation falls during two wet seasons in March–May and October–December.

== Popular culture ==
The volcano is mentioned in the prominent Bengali author Bibhutibhushan Bandyopadhyay's adventure novel Chander Pahar (Mountain of the Moon), published in 1937. In the novel, this previously thought to be dormant volcano suddenly starts erupting violently, and destroys miles of forest all around it, gravely endangering the two protagonists who run for their lives.

== Gallery ==
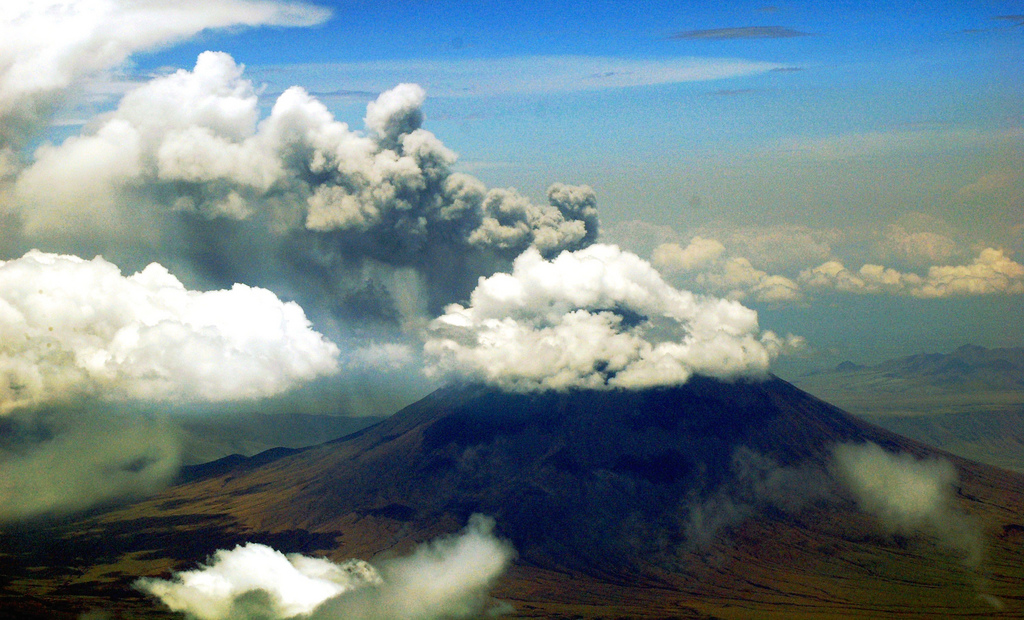
Ol Doinyo Lengai erupting in March 2008

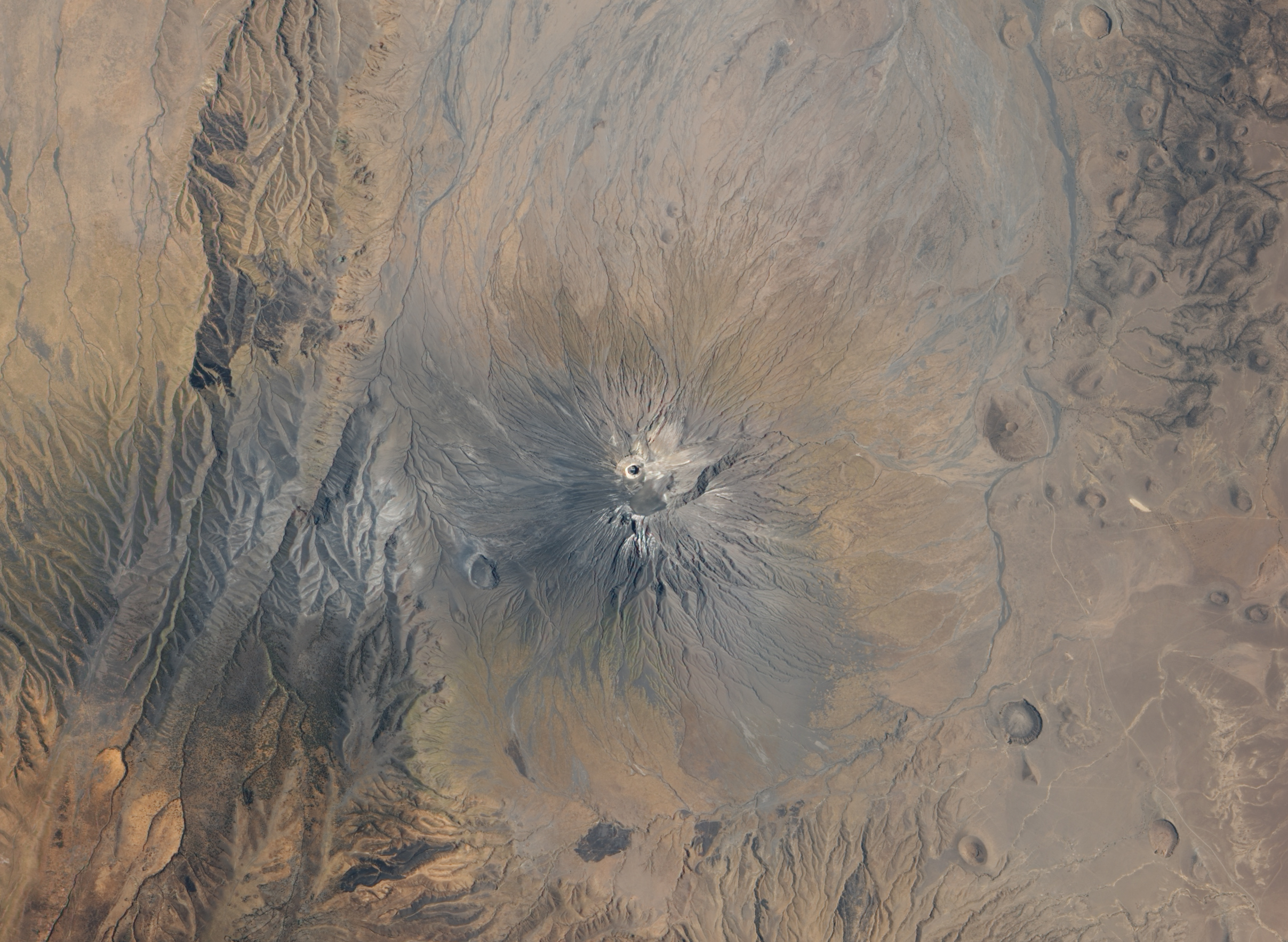
Satellite image (2009) of Ol Doinyo Lengai after an explosive eruption

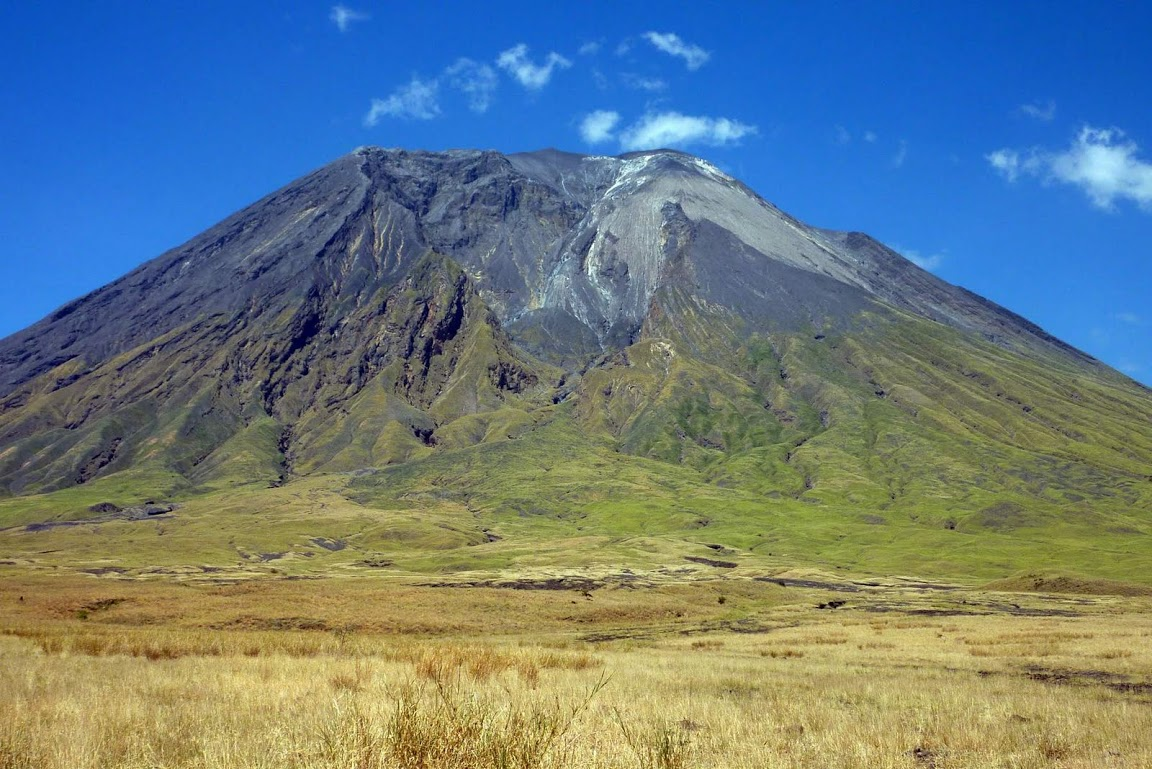
Ol Doinyo Lengai in 2012

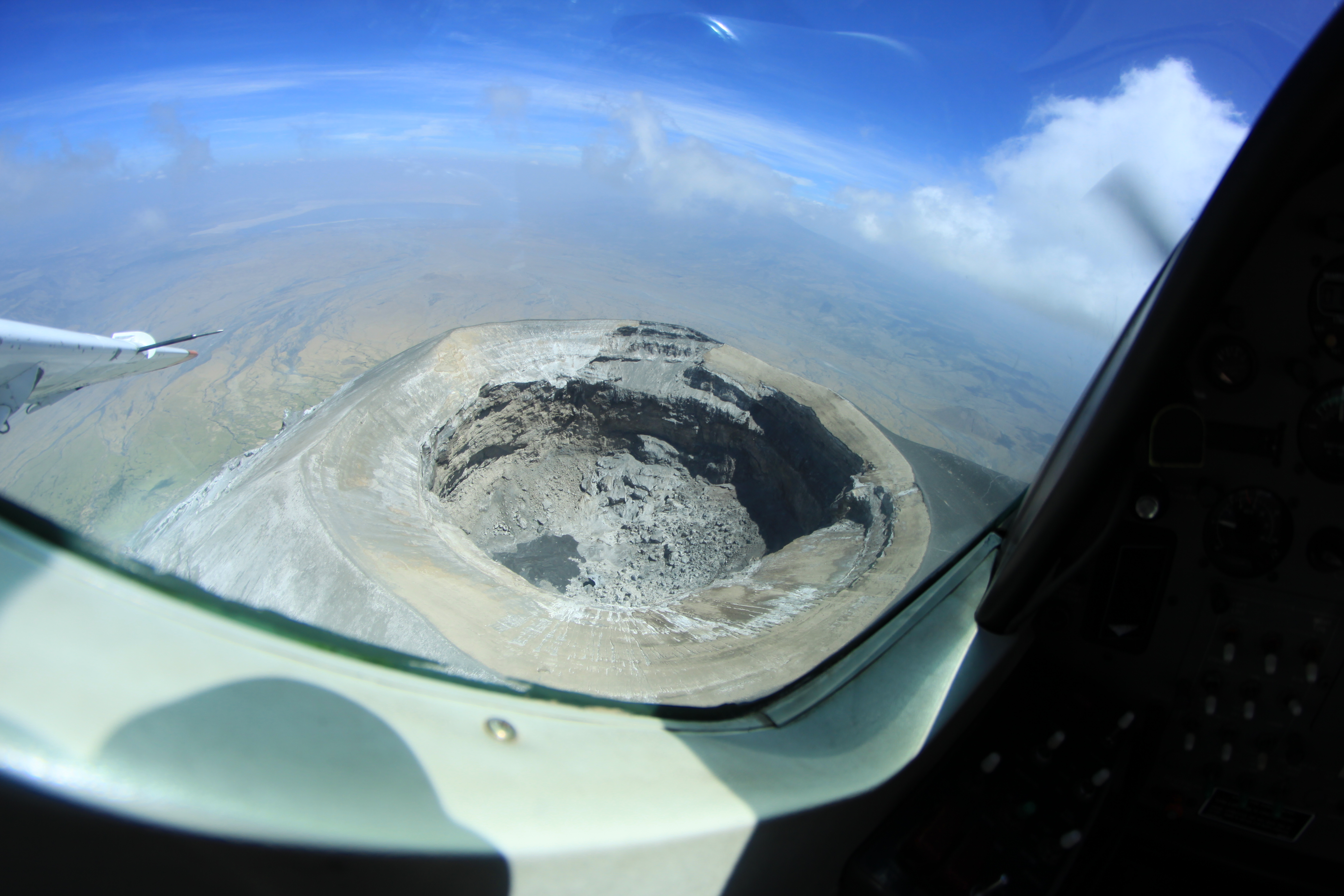
Aerial photo of Oldoinyo Lengai in 2011

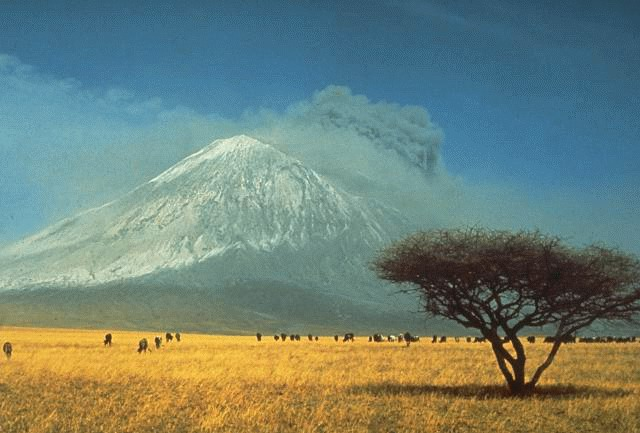
Image of 1966 eruption

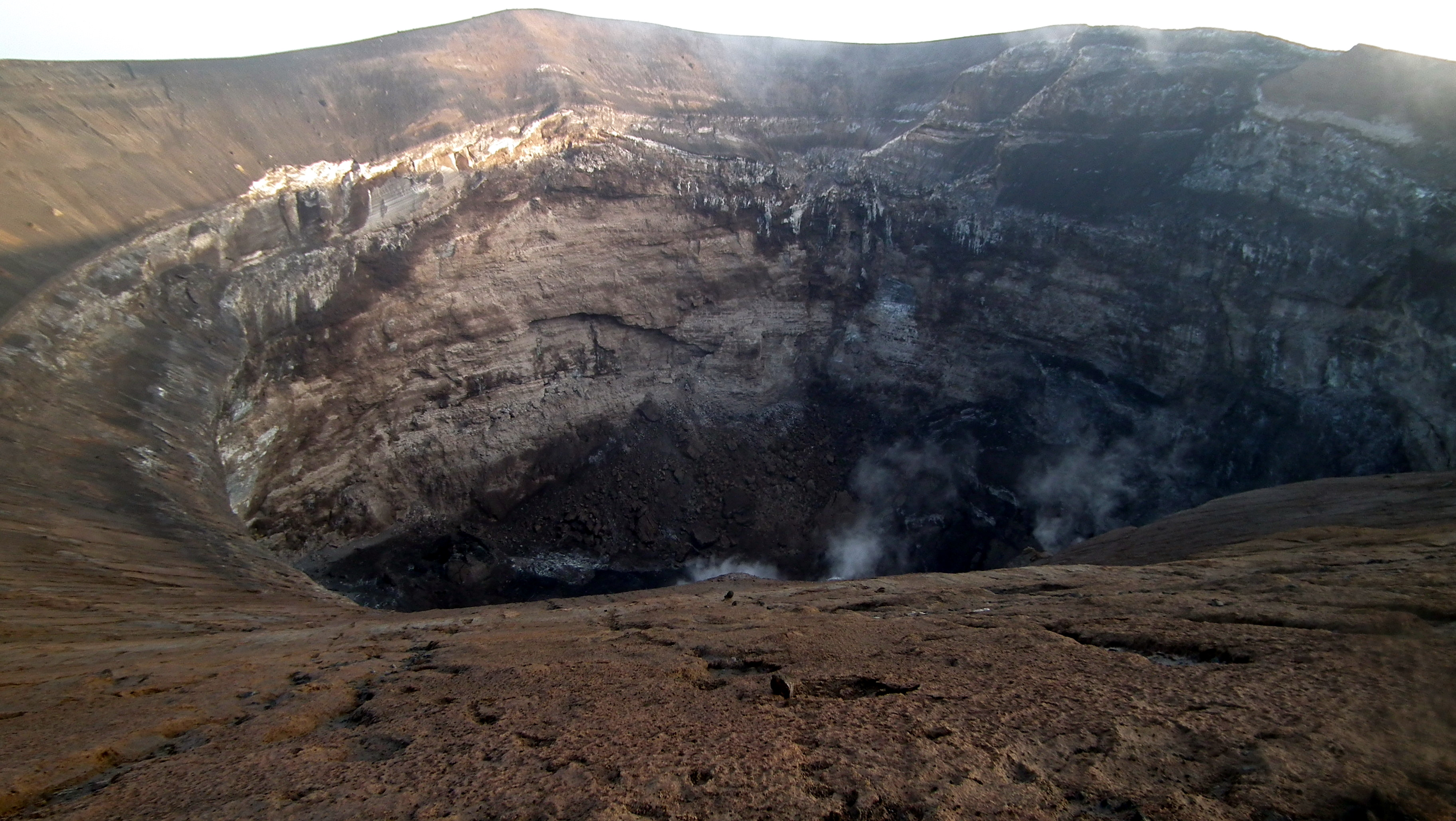
Crater of Ol Doinyo Lengai in 2011

== See also ==
- List of volcanoes in Tanzania
