= Brava (volcano) =

Volcano on Brava Island, Cape Verde

- Location within Cape Verde

Highest point
- Elevation: 956 m (3,136 ft)
- Prominence: 956 m (3,136 ft)
- Coordinates: 14.8514°N 24.7041°W

Geography
- Location: Brava Island
- Country: Cape Verde

Geology
- Rock age: ~ 3.0–0.1 Ma
- Mountain type: Stratovolcano
- Rock type(s): Phonolitic, Basalt
- Last eruption: Holocene (Exact date unknown)

Brava (Portuguese: [ˈbɾavɐ]; lit. 'Brave') is a potentially active stratovolcano in the Cape Verde archipelago, located in the east central Atlantic Ocean about 18 km (11 mi) west of the active volcano Pico do Fogo. It is the smallest inhabited island of Cape Verde, but geologically it is notable for its abundance of phonolitic volcanic rocks, its complex tectonic setting, and its unusual association with carbonatite volcanism. Brava is characterized by a cluster of youthful volcanic craters, lava domes, and phreatomagmatic explosion vents. Although no confirmed historical eruptions are recorded, episodes of seismic unrest in the 20th and 21st centuries show that the system remains active.

== Age ==
Geochronological studies based on ^{40}Ar/^{39}Ar and U–Th dating divide Brava’s volcanic history into three stages:

- Lower Unit (2–3 Ma (million years ago)): Submarine seamount stage, dominated by nephelinitic and ankaramitic pillow lavas and hyaloclastites intruded by dikes.
- Middle Unit (1.8–1.3 Ma): Intrusion of a major alkaline–carbonatite plutonic complex, including syenites and carbonatites.
- Upper Unit (0.25 Ma–present): Post-erosional volcanism marked by explosive phonolitic eruptions, block-and-ash flows, surge deposits, and phreatomagmatic craters. Effusive activity produced lava domes and coulées. Carbonatites also erupted during this phase, an unusual feature among Cape Verde islands.

Pleistocene marine terraces and uplifted pillow lavas indicate continuous tectonic uplift since the seamount stage, with rates of 0.2–0.4 mm (0.0079–0.0157 in) per year.

== Lava chemistry ==
Most of Brava’s lavas are highly alkaline and silica-undersaturated. They range from basanites and nephelinites in the submarine stage to dominantly phonolites. Later volcanic activity is notable for the exceptional volume of phonolitic magmas compared with the neighboring Fogo volcano, where basalt dominates.

Petrological studies indicate that phonolitic melts formed from basanitic magmas through fractional crystallization at multiple depths. Amphibole, especially kaersutite and pargasite, largely control melt evolution and volatile behavior. U-series isotope data suggests that differentiation from basanite to phonolite can occur over timescales ranging from centuries to hundreds of thousands of years depending on magma volume.

A distinctive feature of Brava's lava chemistry is the presence of carbonatite magmas, both intrusive and extrusive. Young extrusive carbonatites are rare globally and unique among the Cape Verde islands.

== Geology ==
Brava is an intraplate ocean-island volcano formed above the Cape Verde hotspot, a mantle plume located in the eastern Atlantic Ocean. The Cape Verde rise is about 2.2 km (1.4 mi) high and up to 1,600 km (990 mi) wide. The volcanic activity at Brava is the result of partial melting from the Cape Verde plume.

Structurally, Brava island is about 10 km (6.2 mi) in diameter and shaped by both volcanism and tectonics. Its morphology is defined by a central plateau between 300 and 976 m (984 and 3,202 ft) elevation, cut by radial valleys and bounded by steep coastal cliffs. Numerous phonolitic domes and phreatomagmatic craters are aligned along active fault zones, including a prominent NNW–SSE graben on the south side of the island.

Brava’s volcanic cones also preserve evidence of repeated uplift since its submarine growth stage. Raised marine terraces and pillow lavas now exposed up to 400 m above sea level indicate steady uplift rates of about 0.2–0.4 mm (0.0079–0.0157 in) per year since at least 2 million years ago. This long-term uplift is interpreted as a hotspot-related flexural response of the lithosphere combined with intrusive magmatic underplating.

== Recent volcanic unrest ==
Although Brava has no confirmed historical eruptions, the island has experienced repeated seismic swarms and unrest. In August 2016, increased seismicity prompted authorities to evacuate 300 people as a precaution, though gas monitoring showed no unusual volcanic gases. A more intense earthquake swarm occurred between October and November 2023, when hundreds of earthquakes were recorded, including a magnitude 4.8 earthquake, accompanied by volcanic tremors. The Cape Verde National Institute of Meteorology and Geophysics raised the alert level from 2 to 3, and residents reported feeling frequent earthquakes. As of October 2025, no eruption has taken place, but seismic unrest continues at lower levels.
