= Carbonatite =

Igneous rock with more than 50% carbonate minerals

- Igneous rock
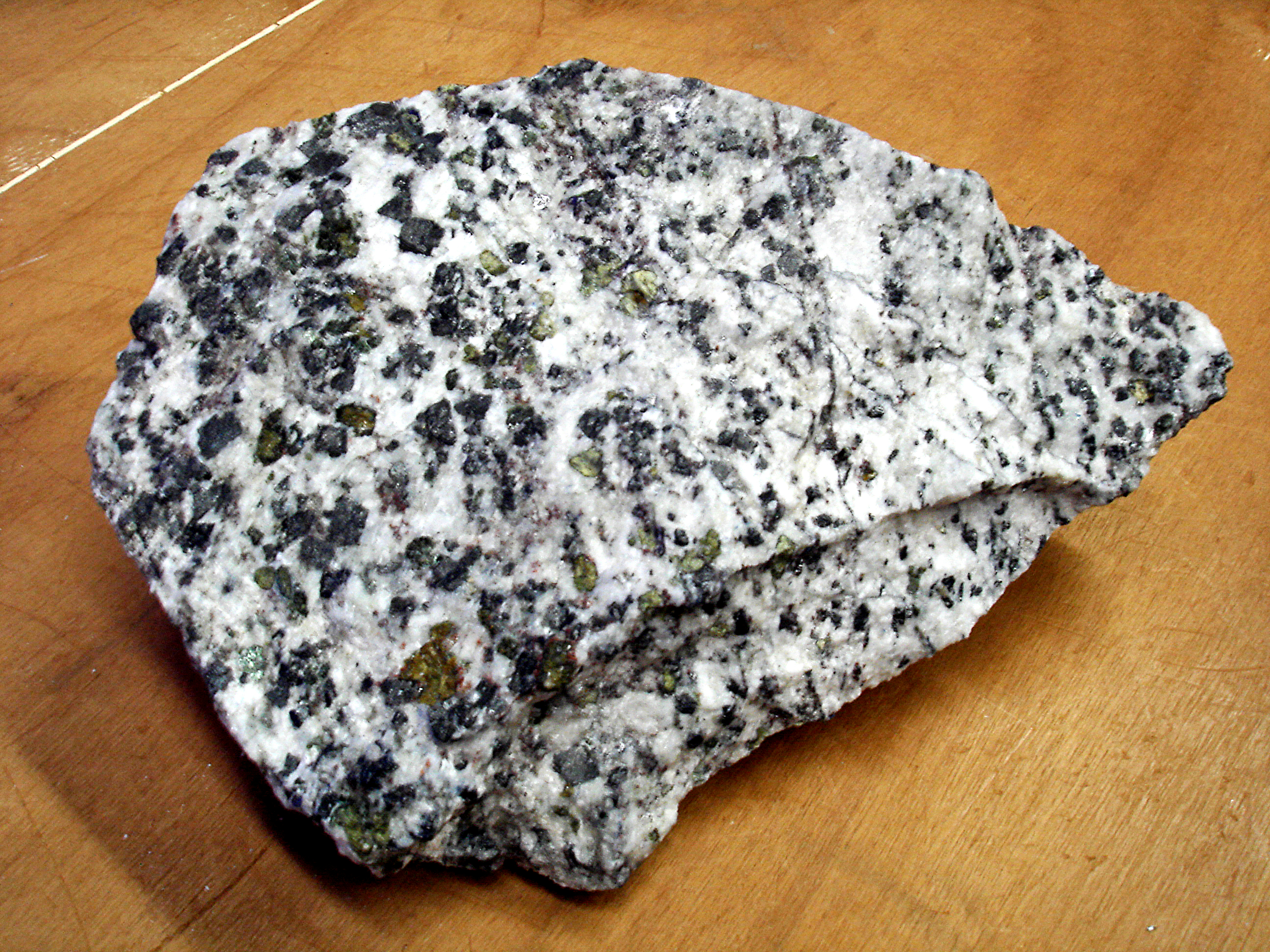
- Carbonatite (mixture of calcite, magnetite, and olivine) from Jacupiranga, Brazil

Composition
- Carbonate minerals (>50%)

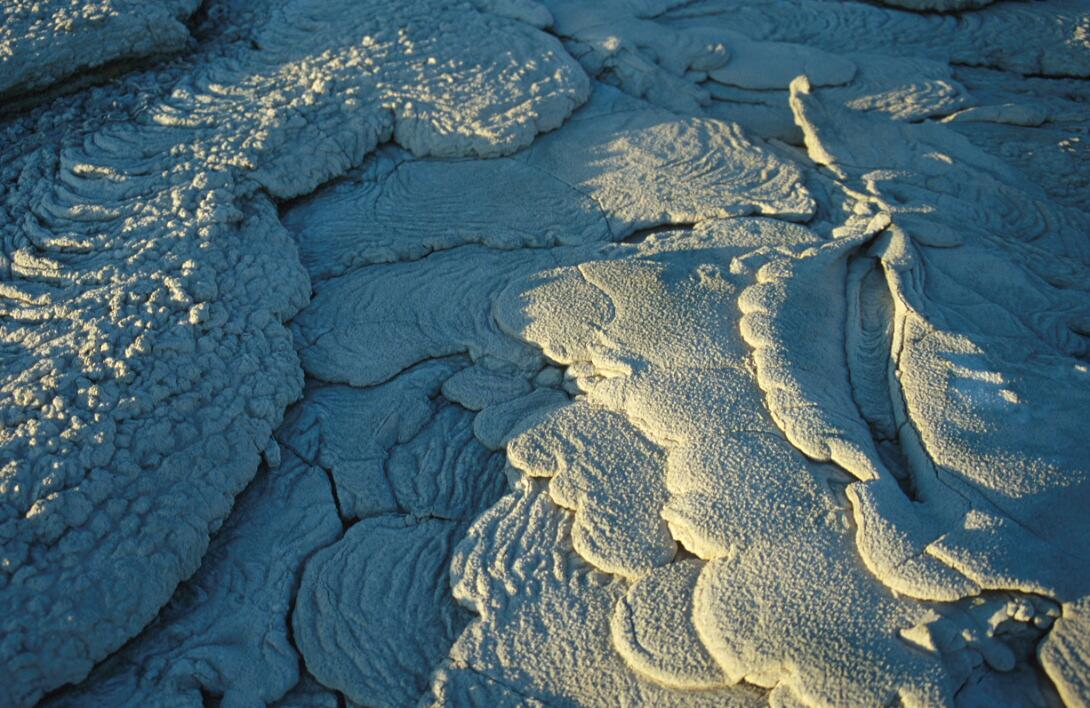
Carbonatite lava at Ol Doinyo Lengai volcano, Tanzania

Carbonatite (/kɑːrˈbɒnəˌtaɪt/) is a type of intrusive or extrusive igneous rock defined by mineralogic composition consisting of greater than 50% carbonate minerals. Carbonatites may be confused with marble and may require geochemical verification.

Carbonatites usually occur as small plugs within zoned alkalic intrusive complexes, or as dikes, sills, breccias, and veins. They are almost exclusively associated with continental rift-related tectonic settings. It seems that there has been a steady increase in the carbonatitic igneous activity through the Earth's history, from the Archean eon to the present.

Nearly all carbonatite occurrences are intrusives or subvolcanic intrusives. This is because carbonatite lava flows, being composed largely of soluble carbonates, are easily weathered and are therefore unlikely to be preserved in the geologic record. Carbonatite eruptions as lava may therefore not be as uncommon as thought, but they have been poorly preserved throughout the Earth's history.

Carbonatite liquid compositions are significantly more alkaline than what is preserved in the fossil carbonatite rock record as composition of the melt inclusions shows.

Only one carbonatite volcano is known to have erupted in historical time, the active Ol Doinyo Lengai volcano in Tanzania. It erupts with the coolest lava in the world, at 500–600 °C (932–1,112 °F). The lava is natrocarbonatite dominated by nyerereite and gregoryite. Another example of carbonatite lava is on Brava Island located in the Cape Verde Islands. Although no recent volcanic eruptions have occurred, present-day seismic unrest shows the volcano is potentially active.

== Genesis ==
The magmatic origin of carbonatite was argued in detail by Swedish geologist Harry von Eckermann in 1948 based on his study of Alnö Complex. It was however the 1960 eruption of Ol Doinyo Lengai in Tanzania that led to geological investigations that finally confirmed the view that carbonatite is derived from magma.

Carbonatites are rare, peculiar igneous rocks formed by unusual processes and from unusual source rocks. Three models of their formation exist:

1. direct generation by very low-degree partial melts in the mantle and melt differentiation,
2. liquid immiscibility between a carbonate melt and a silicate melt,
3. peculiar, extreme crystal fractionation.

Evidence for each process exists, but the key is that these are unusual phenomena. Historically, carbonatites were thought to form by melting of limestone or marble by intrusion of magma, but geochemical and mineralogical data discount this. For example, the carbon isotopic composition of carbonatites is mantle-like and not like sedimentary limestone.

The age of carbonatites ranges from Archean to present: the oldest carbonatite, Tupertalik in Greenland, is 3007 Ma old, while Ol Doinyo Lengai volcano in Tanzania is presently active.

== Mineralogy ==
Primary mineralogy is highly variable, but may include natrolite, sodalite, apatite, magnetite, baryte, fluorite, ancylite group minerals, and other rare minerals not found in more common igneous rocks. Recognition of carbonatites may be difficult, especially as their mineralogy and texture may not differ much from marble except the presence of igneous minerals. They may also be sources of mica or vermiculite.

Carbonatites are classed as calcitic sovite (coarse textured) and alvikite (finer textured) varieties or facies. The two are also distinguished by minor and trace element composition. The terms rauhaugite and beforsite refer to dolomite- and ankerite-rich occurrences respectively. The alkali-carbonatites are termed lengaite. Examples with 50–70% carbonate minerals are termed silico-carbonatites. Additionally, carbonatites may be either enriched in magnetite and apatite or rare-earth elements, fluorine and barium.

Natrocarbonatite is made up largely of two minerals, nyerereite (named after Julius Nyerere, the first president of independent Tanzania) and gregoryite (named after John Walter Gregory, one of the first geologists to study the East African Rift and author of the book The Great Rift Valley). These minerals are both carbonates in which sodium and potassium are present in significant quantities. Both are anhydrous, and when they come into contact with the moisture in the atmosphere, they begin to react extremely quickly. The black or dark brown lava and ash erupted begins to turn white within a few hours, then grey after a few days, then brown after a few weeks.

== Geochemistry ==
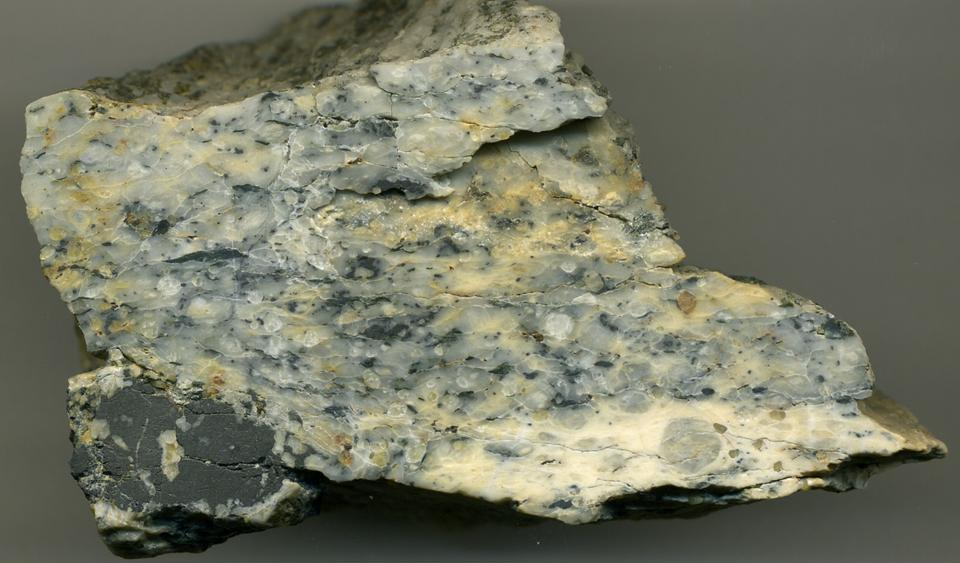
Magnesiocarbonatite, from Verity-Paradise Carbonatite Complex of British Columbia. Specimen is 75 mm wide.

Carbonatites are unusual igneous rocks composed predominantly of carbonate minerals. Most carbonatites tend to include some silicate mineral fraction; by definition an igneous rock containing >50% carbonate minerals is classified as a carbonatite. Silicate minerals associated with such compositions are pyroxene, olivine, and silica-undersaturated minerals such as nepheline and other feldspathoids.

Geochemically, carbonatites are dominated by incompatible elements (Ba, Cs, Rb) and depletions in compatible elements (Hf, Zr, Ti). This together with their silica-undersaturated composition supports inferences that carbonatites are formed by low degrees of partial melting.

A specific type of hydrothermal alteration termed fenitization is typically associated with carbonatite intrusions. This alteration assemblage produces a unique rock mineralogy termed a fenite after its type locality, the Fen Complex in Norway. The alteration consists of metasomatic halos consisting of sodium rich silicates arfvedsonite, barkevikite and glaucophane along with phosphates, hematite and other iron and titanium oxides.

== Occurrence ==
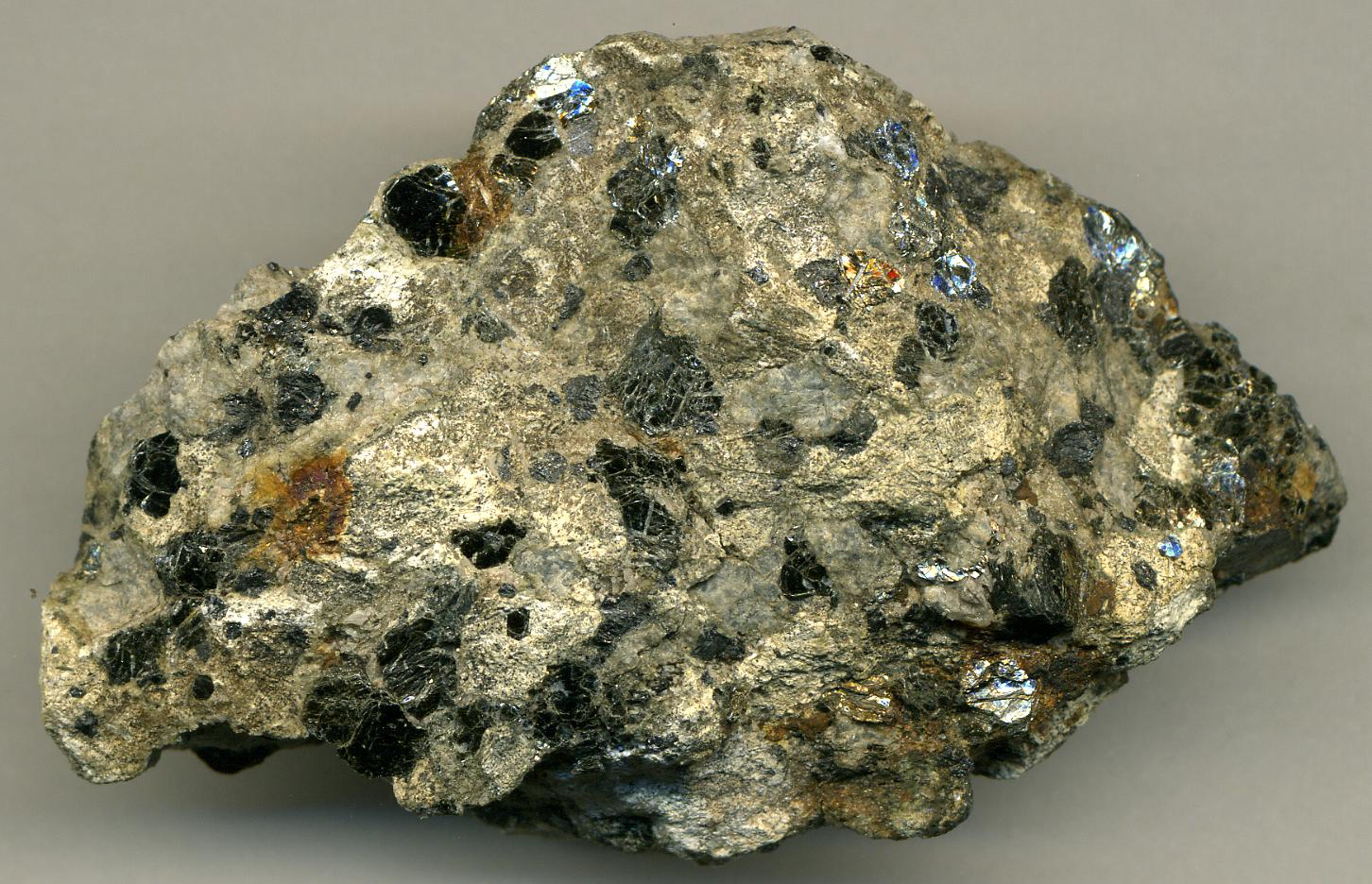
Okaite, an ultramafic rock found near the carbonatite of the Oka Carbonatite Complex, Oka, Quebec

Overall, 527 carbonatite localities are known on Earth, and they are found on all continents and also on oceanic islands. Most of the carbonatites are shallow intrusive bodies of calcite-rich igneous rocks in form of volcanic necks, dykes, and cone-sheets. These generally occur in association with larger intrusions of alkali-rich silicate igneous rocks. The extrusive carbonatites are particularly rare, only 49 are known, and they appear to be restricted to a few continental rift zones, such as the Rhine valley and the East African rift system.

Associated igneous rocks typically include ijolite, melteigite, teschenite, lamprophyres, phonolite, foyaite, shonkinite, silica undersaturated foid-bearing pyroxenite (essexite), and nepheline syenite.

Carbonatites are typically associated with undersaturated (low silica) igneous rocks that are either alkali (Na_{2}O and K_{2}O), ferric iron (Fe_{2}O_{3}) and zirconium-rich agpaitic rocks or alkali-poor, FeO-CaO-MgO-rich and zirconium-poor miaskitic rocks.

The Mount Weld carbonatite is unassociated with a belt or suite of alkaline igneous rocks, although calc-alkaline magmas are known in the region. The genesis of this Archaean carbonatite remains contentious as it is the sole example of an Archaean carbonatite in Australia.

=== Intrusive morphology ===
Carbonatite is known to form in association with concentrically zoned complexes of alkaline-igneous rocks, the typical example of this being Phalaborwa, South Africa.

Carbonatites in the form of sills, lopoliths and rare dikes are reported in the Guyana Shield.

The Mud Tank and Mount Weld carbonatites take the form of multi-stage cylindrical intrusive bodies with several distinct phases of carbonatite intrusion. Smaller carbonatite sills and dikes are present in other Proterozoic mobile belts in Australia, typically as dikes and discontinuous pods.

=== Known examples ===
Dozens of carbonatites are known including:

- the Bearpaw Mountains, Montana;
- the Oka and Saint-Honoré, Quebec;
- Gem Park and Iron Hill, Colorado;
- Magnet Cove igneous complex, Arkansas;
- Mountain Pass, California;
- the Palabora Complex near Phalaborwa, South Africa;
- Jacupiranga, Brazil;
- Ayopaya, Bolivia;
- Cerro Impacto, Venezuela;
- Kovdor and Vischnevogorsk, Russia;
- Amba Dongar and Newania from India;
- Maz, Argentina;
- the Mud Tank and Mount Weld, Australia;
- the Fen Complex, Norway;
- part of the basal complex of Fuerteventura, Spain;
- the Avon Volcanic District, Missouri;
- the Elk Creek Carbonatite, Nebraska, USA.

In 2017, the discovery of a new carbonatite deposit was confirmed north-west of Prince George, British Columbia, in a region termed the "Rocky Mountain Rare Metal Belt".

The volcano Ol Doinyo Lengai, in the East African Rift is the world's only active carbonatite volcano. Other older carbonatite volcanoes are located in the same region, including Mount Homa.

== Economic importance ==
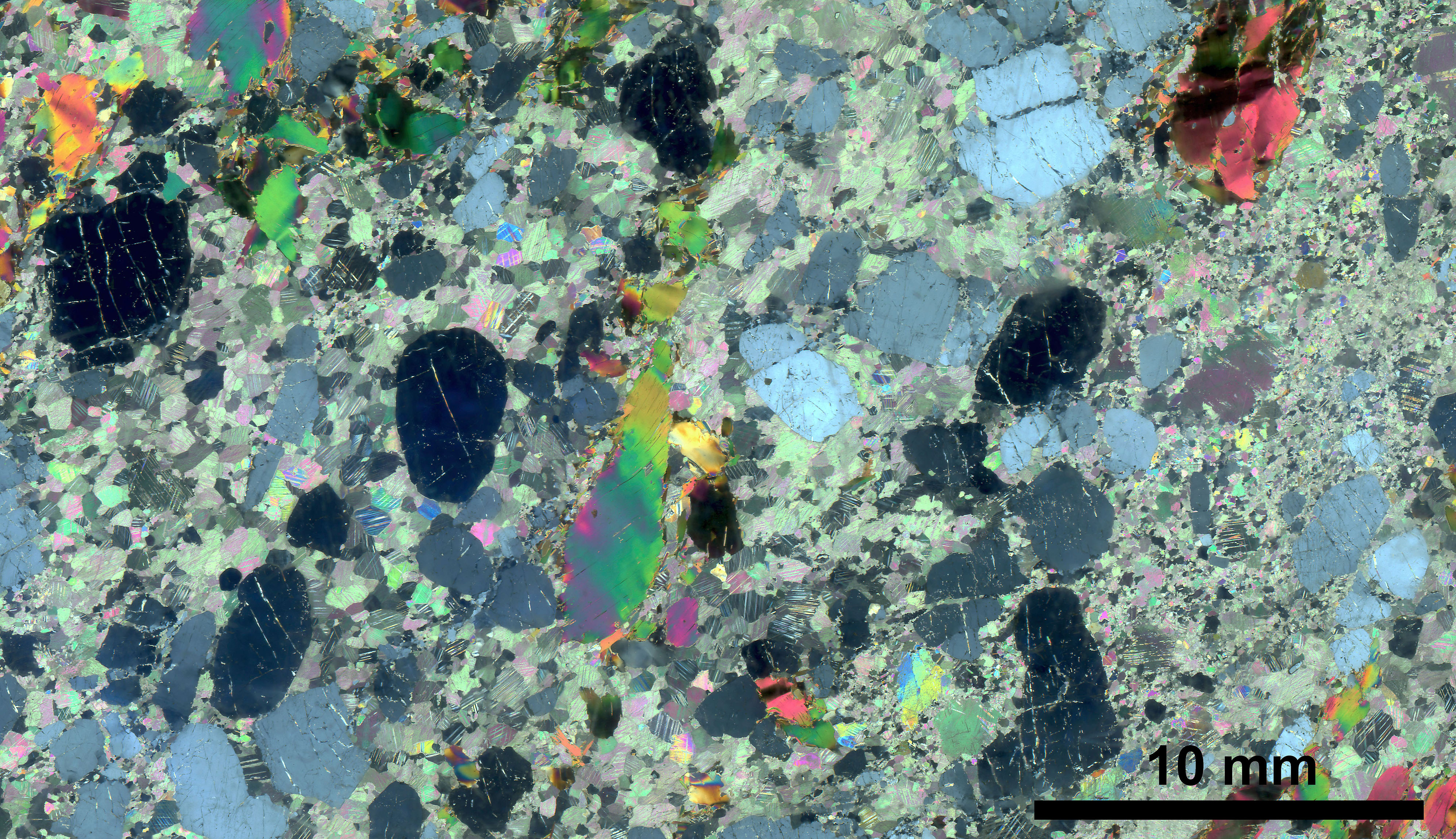
Thin section of apatite-rich carbonatite in cross polarised transmitted light. The sample is from Siilinjärvi apatite mine.

Carbonatites may contain economic or anomalous concentrations of rare-earth elements (REEs), phosphorus, niobium–tantalum, uranium, thorium, copper, iron, titanium, vanadium, barium, fluorine, zirconium, and other rare or incompatible elements. Apatite, barite and vermiculite are among the industrially important minerals associated with some carbonatites.

Trace elements are extremely enriched in carbonatites, and they have the highest concentration of lanthanides of any known rock type. The largest REE-carbonatite deposits are Bayan Obo, Mountain Pass, Maoniuping, and Mount Weld.

Vein deposits of thorium, fluorite, or rare-earth elements may be associated with carbonatites and may be hosted internal to or within the metasomatized aureole of a carbonatite.

As an example, the Palabora complex of South Africa has produced significant copper (as chalcopyrite, bornite and chalcocite), apatite, vermiculate along with lesser magnetite, linnaeite (cobalt), baddeleyite (zirconium–hafnium), and by-product gold, silver, nickel and platinum.

== Sources ==
- Duncan R. K., Willett G. C. (1990) – Mount Weld Carbonatite: in Hughes F. E. (Ed.), 1990 Geology of the Mineral Deposits of Australia & Papua New Guinea The AusIMM, Melbourne Mono 14, v. 1 pp. 591–597.
- "Carbonatite Deposits" (PDF). USGS Carbonatite Deposits.
- "Descriptive Model of Carbonatite Deposits". USGS Descriptive Model of Carbonatite Deposits.
- "World's Coolest Lava is in Africa". Volcano Watch April 17, 2003.
- "Rare earth minerals in carbonatites of Basal Complex of Fuerteventura (Canary Islands, Spain)" (PDF).
- Bolivian carbonatite occurrences.
