= Panda Hill Carbonatite =

The Panda Hill Carbonatite is an apatite and pyrochlore bearing sovite carbonatite located in the Mbeya District of Tanzania. The deposit was found in the mid-1950s by the then Geological Survey of Tanganyika (now Tanzania). Niobium ore occurs largely in pyrochlore bearing sovite (carbonatite composed largely of calcite) and dolmite-rich carbonatite.

The deposit also contains lesser phosphate mineralisation associated with apatite.

== History ==
Panda Hill was first developed for niobium in the late 1950s and early 1960s by the then N. V. Billiton. A pilot mill and small open pit mine operated from 1957 to 1960 that produced concentrate that was then shipped to the Netherlands for further processing.

The deposit is currently under development by Cradle Resources to mine niobium by open pit mining methods. The project has reported resources of 96 million tonnes of mineralisation at an average grade of 0.52% Nb_{2}O_{5}. If successful the Panda Hill niobium deposit will be the first niobium mine in Africa.

== Pandaite ==
The Panda Hill carbonatite is also notable as being the source location of the mineral pandaite - a hydrated barium-strontium pyrochlore associated with biotite-rich contact metamorphic rocks. Jager et al. recommended the name pandaite after analysing rock samples from Panda Hill in 1958 with the following formula described: (Ba_{0.30}Sr_{0.22}Ca_{0.05}Ce_{0.04}Na_{0.03}Fe_{0.02}K_{0.01}Th_{0.01})(Nb_{1.83}Ta_{0.004}Ti_{0.17})O_{5.61}(H_{2}O)_{0.80}

Other later recorded occurrences include at Mt Kukisvumchorr in the Khibiny Massif (Kola Peninsula) in Northern Region, Russia; and at the Mrima Hill niobium deposit in Kenya within a residuum consisting mainly of goethite/limonite and gorceixite.
