= Combeite =

Silicate mineral

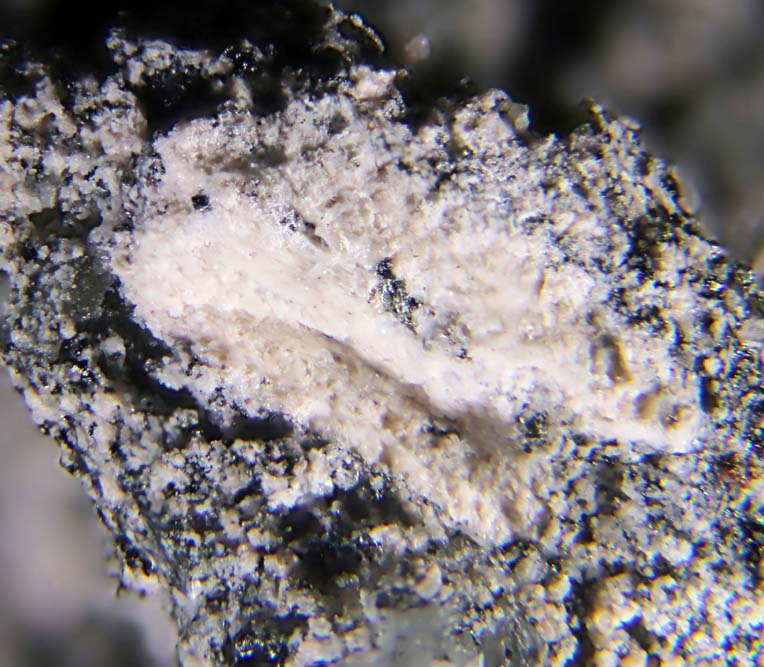
- Pale pink crystal aggregates of the very rare silicate mineral combeite from one of the only 4 localities known worldwide: Mount Oldoinyo Lengai, Arusha Region, Tanzania.

General
- Category: Silicate mineral
- Formula: Na_{2}Ca_{2}Si_{3}O_{9}
- IMA symbol: Cbe
- Strunz classification: 9.CJ.15a
- Crystal system: Trigonal
- Crystal class: Trapezohedral (32) (same H-M symbol)
- Space group: P3_{1}21
- Unit cell: a = 10.42 Å, c = 13.14 Å; Z = 6

Identification
- Color: Colorless
- Crystal habit: Stout prisms
- Streak: White
- Diaphaneity: Transparent
- Specific gravity: 2.844
- Optical properties: Uniaxial (+)
- Refractive index: n_{ω} = 1.598 n_{ε} = 1.598
- Birefringence: δ = 0.000

Combeite is a rare silicate mineral with the formula Na_{2}Ca_{2}Si_{3}O_{9}. It has a trigonal crystal system.

== Discovery and occurrence ==
It was first described in 1957 for an occurrence in nephelinite lavas and tephra on Mount Nyiragongo, Goma, Kivu, Democratic Republic of Congo (then Zaïre). It has also been reported from the Bellerberg volcano in Ettringen, Germany and the Oldoinyo Lengai volcano, Tanzania. It was named for Arthur Delmar Combe of the Geological Survey of Uganda.

It is associated with götzenite at Mount Shaheru, Congo; and with wollastonite, clinopyroxene, nepheline, melilite, titanian garnet and titanian magnetite at Oldoinyo Lengai.
