= Magnet Cove igneous complex =

Ring dike in Arkansas

Coordinates: 34.453889°N 92.843889°W

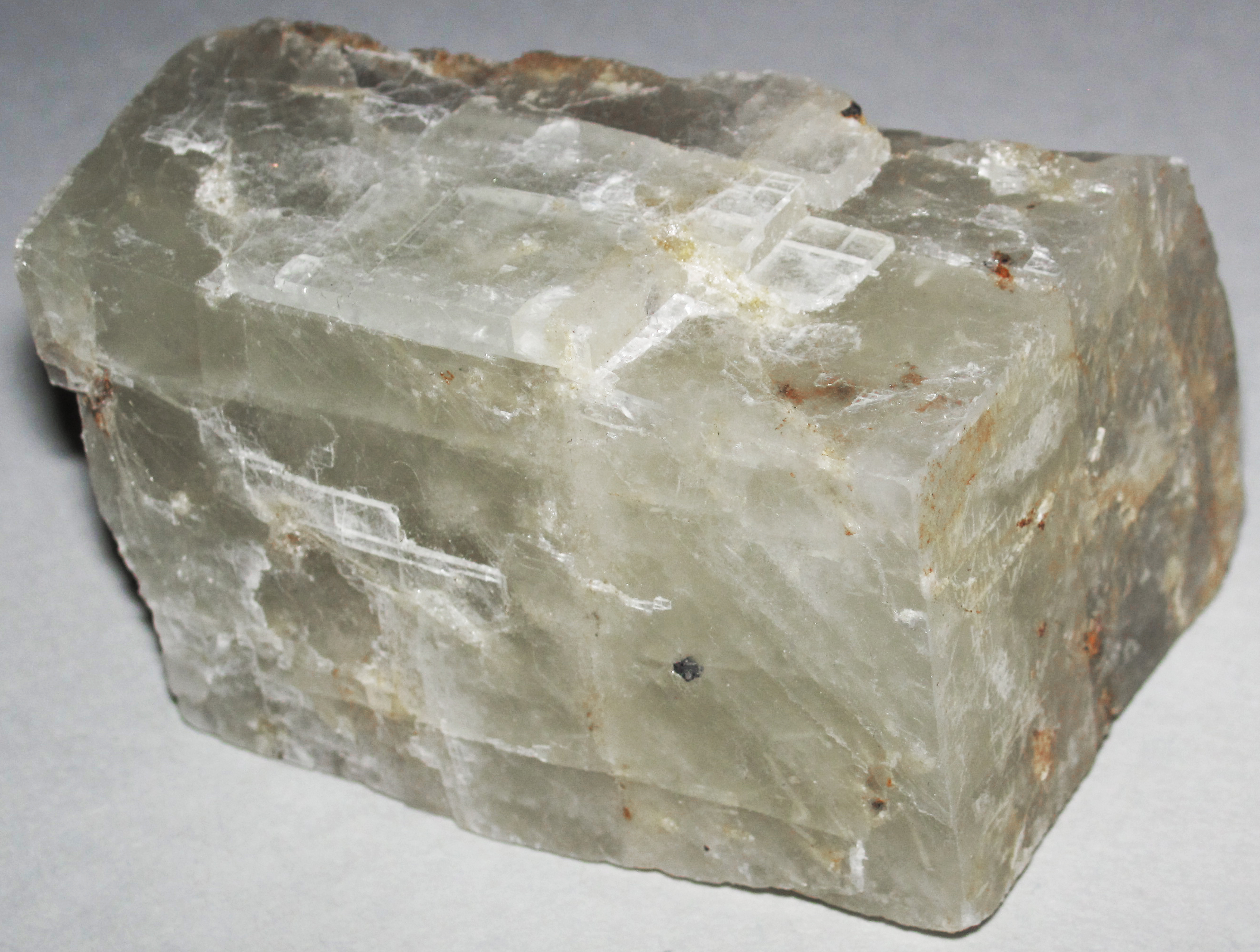
Calciocarbonatite (sövite) (Magnet Cove Carbonatite, mid-Cretaceous; Cove Creek, Hot Spring County, Arkansas)

The Magnet Cove igneous complex is a small alkalic ring complex lying to the west of the town of Magnet Cove in Hot Spring County, Arkansas. It and the adjacent town are so named due to the existence of magnetite and the terrain being a cove, a basin-shaped valley.

The complex is of Mesozoic age, intruded into Paleozoic sediments. Mapping was conducted by the geologists Erickson and Blade in 1963. Units within the complex include carbonatite, nepheline syenite, phonolite, and ijolite.

In addition to the magnetite which forms both massive lodestone and crystals, the complex is strewn with odd and rare minerals, and is the type locality for five mineral species. Over 100 different minerals have been identified from the area. There are many titanium minerals such as rutile, anatase, brookite, and perovskite, as well as some vanadium mineralization. Some rare-earth-bearing minerals have also been identified.

Many companies have mined the area over the last century, including the Diamond Jo Quarry.

The complex has developed a unique soil series, Magnet, which has several inches of dark reddish brown loam over reddish brown clay or clay loam. The Magnet is present only over 5000 acres at the complex and a small outlier at Potash Sulphur Springs.

Arkansas Highway 51 runs generally east–west through Magnet Cove.
