= Natrocarbonatite =

Rare carbonatite lava which erupts from the Ol Doinyo Lengai volcano in Tanzania

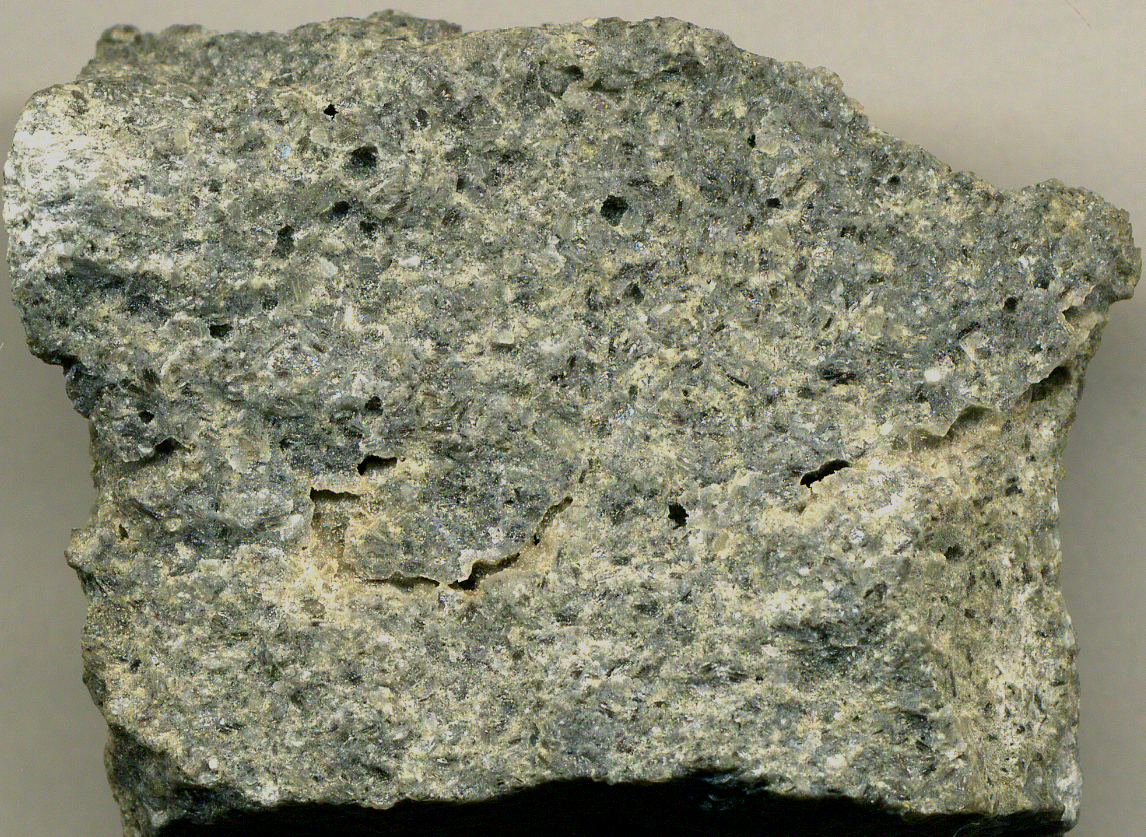
Sample of natrocarbonatite, 4.1 cm across, from the 1963 pahoehoe lava flow of Ol Doinyo Lengai

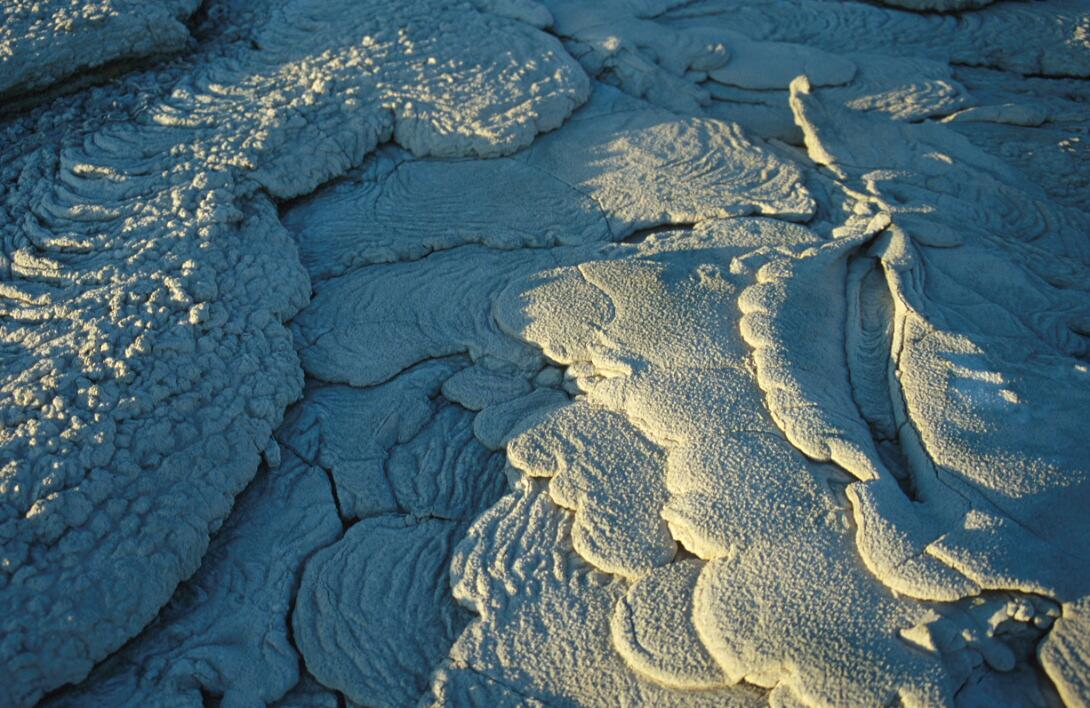
Solidified lava in the crater of Ol Doinyo Lengai

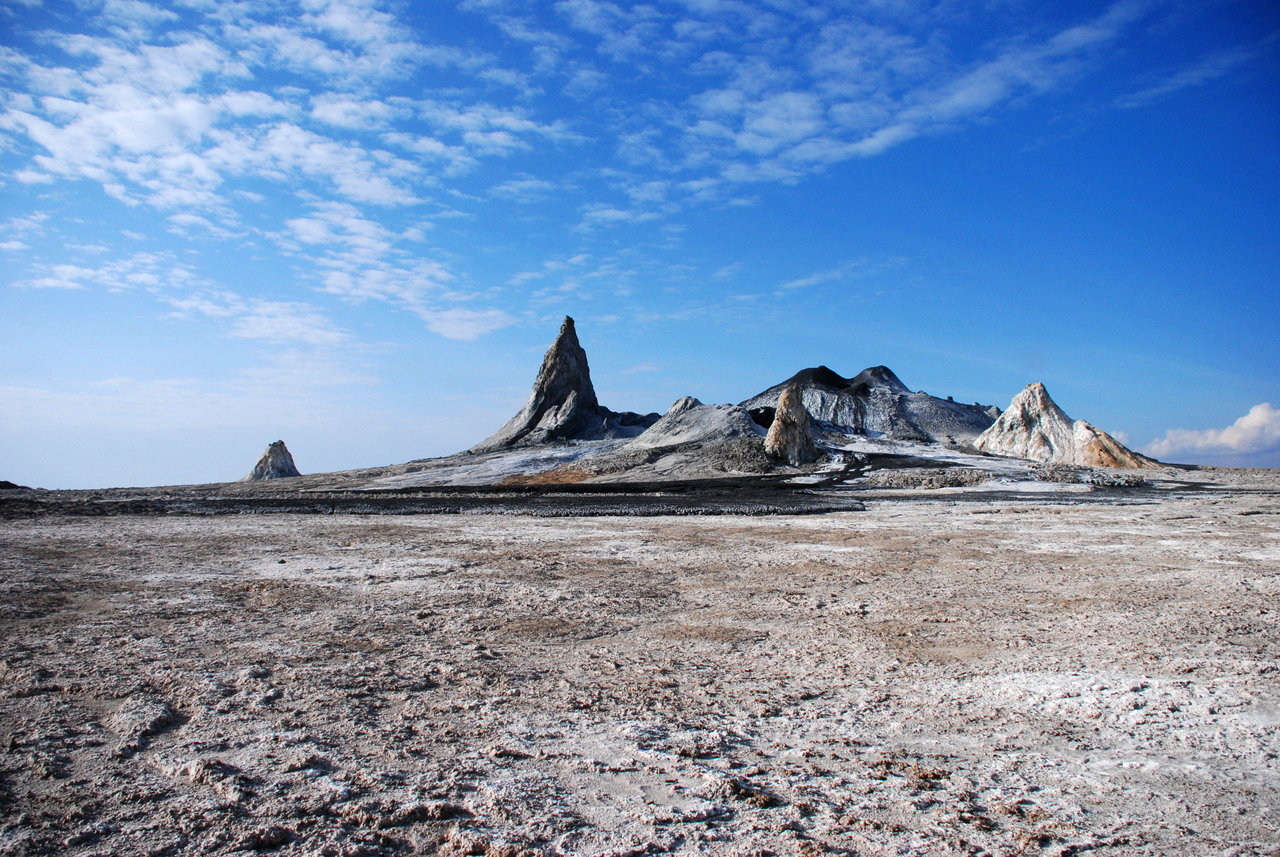
Crater of Ol Doinyo Lengai with hours-old black natrocarbonatite lava flow and older white natrocarbonatite lava flows, August 2007

Natrocarbonatite is a rare carbonatite lava which erupts from the Ol Doinyo Lengai volcano in Tanzania within the East African Rift of eastern Africa. Natrocarbonatite lavas were first documented in 1962, by J. B. Dawson.

== Composition ==
Whereas most lavas are rich in silicate minerals, the natrocarbonatite lavas of Ol Doinyo Lengai are rich in two rare sodium and potassium carbonate minerals: nyerereite and gregoryite.

Due to this unusual composition, the lava is erupted at relatively low temperatures (approximately 500–600 °C). This temperature is so low that the molten lava appears black in sunlight, rather than having the red glow common to most lavas. It is also much more fluid than silicate lavas.

== Impact ==
The sodium and potassium carbonate minerals of the lavas erupted at Ol Doinyo Lengai are unstable at the Earth's surface and susceptible to rapid weathering, the minerals are anhydrous and when they come into contact with the moisture of the atmosphere, they begin to react extremely quickly.

The black or dark brown lava and ash erupted begins to turn white within a few hours. The resulting volcanic landscape is different from any other in the world.

== In popular culture ==
Notable appearances

- Etnatao: Ol Doinyo Lengai Volcano Tanzania
- Eruption
- Ol Doinyo Lengai Volcano HDTV (from a French TV documentary)
