= Magnesium fluoride =

Chemical compound of magnesium and fluorine

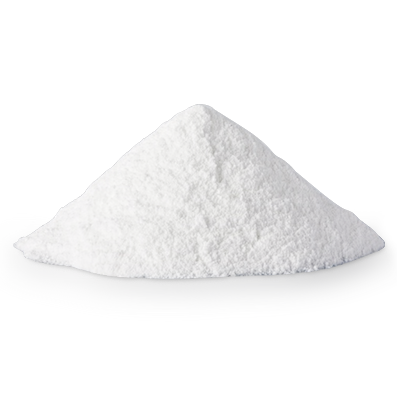
- Magnesium fluoride

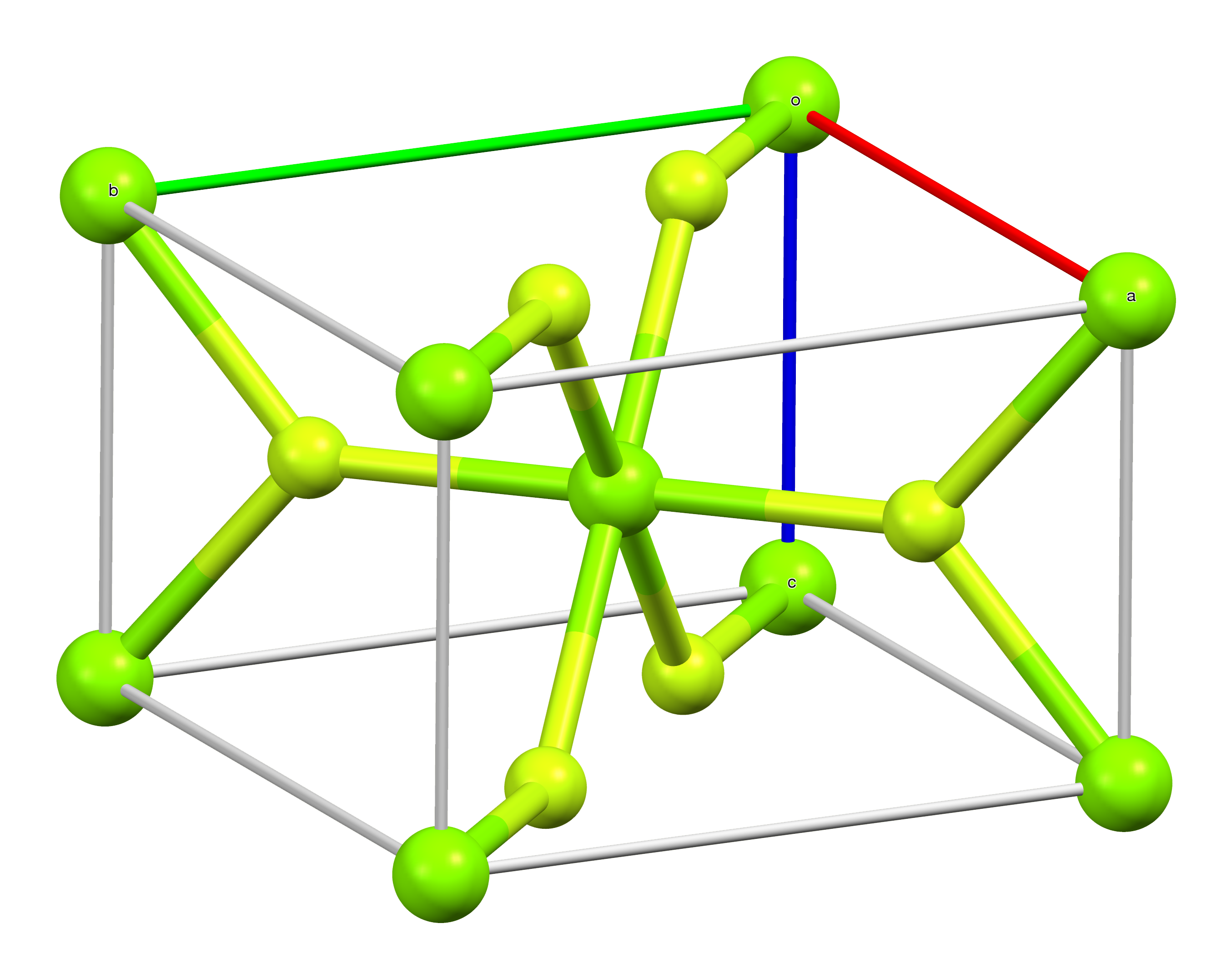

Names
- Other names Sellaite; Irtran-1

Identifiers
CAS Number	7783-40-6
3D model (JSmol)	Interactive image; Interactive image
ChemSpider	22952
ECHA InfoCard	100.029.086
EC Number	231-995-1
PubChem CID	24546
RTECS number	OM3325000
UNII	5N014C7IWU
CompTox Dashboard (EPA)	DTXSID7052523
- InChI: InChI=1S/2FH.Mg/h2*1H;/q;;+2/p-2 Key: ORUIBWPALBXDOA-UHFFFAOYSA-L; InChI=1/2FH.Mg/h2*1H;/q;;+2/p-2 Key: ORUIBWPALBXDOA-NUQVWONBAK
- SMILES: F[Mg]F; [Mg+2].[F-].[F-]

Properties
Chemical formula	MgF_{2}
Molar mass	62.302 g·mol^{−1}
Appearance	Colorless to white tetragonal crystals
Density	3.148 g/cm^{3}
Melting point	1,263 °C (2,305 °F; 1,536 K)
Boiling point	2,260 °C (4,100 °F; 2,530 K)
Solubility in water	0.013 g/(100 mL)
Solubility product (K_{sp})	5.16⋅10^{−11}
Solubility	Soluble in nitric acid; Slightly soluble in acetone; Insoluble in ethanol
Magnetic susceptibility (χ)	−22.7⋅10^{−6} cm^{3}/mol
Refractive index (n_{D})	1.37397

Structure
Crystal structure	Rutile (tetragonal), tP6
Space group	P4_{2}/mnm, No. 136

Thermochemistry
Heat capacity (C)	61.6 J/(mol⋅K)
Std molar entropy (S^{⦵}_{298})	57.2 J/(mol⋅K)
Std enthalpy of formation (Δ_{f}H^{⦵}_{298})	−1124.2 kJ/mol
Gibbs free energy (Δ_{f}G^{⦵})	−1071 kJ/mol

Hazards
- GHS labelling
Pictograms	
Signal word	Warning
Hazard statements	H303, H315, H319, H335
Precautionary statements	P261, P264, P264+P265, P271, P280, P302+P352, P304+P340, P305+P351+P338, P319, P321, P332+P317, P337+P317, P362+P364, P403+P233, P405, P501
NFPA 704 (fire diamond)	3 0 0
- Lethal dose or concentration (LD, LC)
LD_{50} (median dose)	2330 (rat, oral)
Safety data sheet (SDS)	ChemicalBook

Related compounds
Other anions	Magnesium chloride; Magnesium bromide; Magnesium iodide
Other cations	Beryllium fluoride; Calcium fluoride; Strontium fluoride; Barium fluoride; Radium fluoride
Related compounds	Hydrogen fluoride; Zinc fluoride; Aluminium fluoride
- Except where otherwise noted, data are given for materials in their standard state (at 25 °C [77 °F], 100 kPa). verify (what is ?) Infobox references

Magnesium fluoride is an ionically bonded inorganic compound with the formula MgF_{2}. The compound is a colorless to white crystalline salt that is transparent over a wide range of wavelengths, such that it is used in the optical windows of space telescopes. It occurs naturally as the rare mineral sellaite.

== Production ==
Magnesium fluoride is prepared from magnesium oxide with sources of hydrogen fluoride such as ammonium bifluoride, by the breakdown of it:

MgO + [NH_{4}]HF_{2} → MgF_{2} + NH_{3} + H_{2}O

Related metathesis reactions are also feasible:

Mg(OH)_{2} + CuF_{2} → MgF_{2} + Cu(OH)_{2}

== Structure ==
The compound crystallizes as tetragonal birefringent crystals. The structure of the magnesium fluoride is similar to that of rutile, featuring octahedral Mg^{2+} cations and 3-coordinate F^{−} anions.

Coordination geometry in magnesium fluoride
Magnesium coordination	Fluorine coordination

In the gas phase, monomeric MgF_{2} molecules adopt a linear molecular geometry.

== Uses ==
=== Optics ===
Magnesium fluoride is transparent over an extremely wide range of wavelengths. Windows, lenses, and prisms made of this material can be used over the entire range of wavelengths from 0.120 μm (vacuum ultraviolet) to 8.0 μm (infrared). High-quality, synthetic magnesium fluoride is one of two materials (the other being lithium fluoride) that will transmit in the vacuum ultraviolet range at 121 nm (Lyman alpha).

Magnesium fluoride is tough and polishes well but is slightly birefringent and should therefore be cut with the optic axis perpendicular to the plane of the window or lens. Due to its suitable refractive index of 1.37, magnesium fluoride is commonly applied in thin layers to the surfaces of optical elements as an inexpensive anti-reflective coating. Its Verdet constant is 0.00810 arcmin⋅G^{−1}⋅cm^{−1} at 632.8 nm.

== Safety ==
Chronic exposure to magnesium fluoride may affect the skeleton, kidneys, central nervous system, respiratory system, eyes and skin, and may cause or aggravate attacks of asthma.
