= Sovite =

Igneous rock

Sovite Calciocarbonate
- Igneous rock
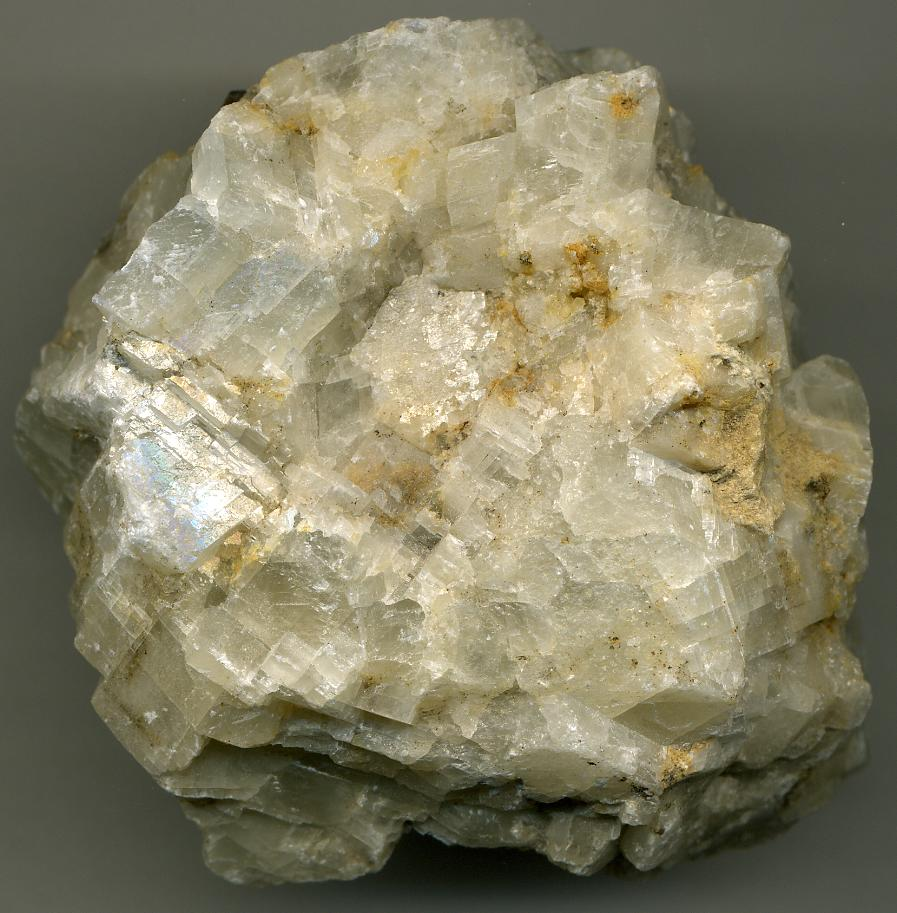
- Sovite (Locality: Cove Creek, Arkansas. Specimen 7.5 cm)

Composition
- Majority Calcite

Sovite (or sövite) is the coarse-grained variety (or facies) of carbonatite, an intrusive, igneous rock. The fine-grained variety of carbonatite is known as alvikite. The two varieties are distinguished by minor and trace element compositions. Sovite is often a medium-to-coarse-grained calcite rock with variable accessory amphibole, biotite, pyrite, pyrochlore and fluorite.

== See also ==
- Panda Hill Carbonatite
