= Mount Weld mine =

Mine in Western Australia

Mount Weld
- Location in Western Australia
- Interactive map of Mount Weld
- Location: Laverton, Western Australia, Australia; 28°51′36″S 122°32′52″E
- Products: Rare earths
- Company: Lynas
- Website: lynasrareearths.com/about-us/locations/mt-weld-western-australia/

Mount Weld mine is a rare earth mine in Western Australia, located about 30 km (20 mi) south of Laverton and 120 km (75 mi) east of Leonora. It is owned by Lynas Corporation. Mining began at the Mount Weld site in 2011.

== Geology ==
Rare-earths are contained in secondary phosphates and aluminophosphates, presumably derived from weathering of the Proterozoic Mount Weld carbonatite. The primary commercial interest at the site is targeted towards oxides as well as further niobium and tantalum deposits within the intrusive pipe of the Mount Weld carbonatite, which is approximately 3 km (1.9 mi) in diameter.

The main deposits are hosted within the soil and regolith horizon that blankets the entire carbonatite and form shallow lenses within 60 m (200 ft) of the surface. The most important rare-earth oxide deposit, the Central Lanthanide Deposit, CLD, discovered in 1988, is located at the centre of the carbonatite, with the niobium/tantalum and other deposits generally located towards outer fringes.

As of 2005 it was one of the largest rare earth deposits in the world.

== Location ==
Mount Weld mine is located 30 km (20 mi) south of Laverton and 120 km (75 mi) east of Leonora.

== Ownership ==
The Mount Weld deposit is owned by ASX-listed Lynas Corporation, which raised A$450 million equity from J. P. Morgan in 2009 to fund the development of a mine and also a processing plant in Kuantan, Malaysia. The mine opened in 2011 and as of 2021 is an important source for rare-earth elements.
