= Cerro Impacto =

Large mineral deposit

Cerro Impacto is a large mineral deposit in the southern Venezuelan state of Amazonas.
