= Nyerereite =

Very rare sodium calcium carbonate mineral

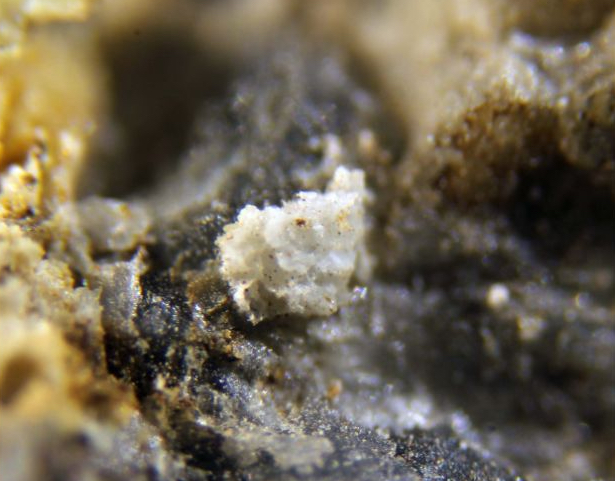

General
- Category: Carbonate mineral
- Formula: Na_{2}Ca(CO_{3})_{2}
- IMA symbol: Nye
- Strunz classification: 5.AC.10
- Crystal system: Orthorhombic
- Crystal class: Pyramidal (mm2); H-M symbol: (mm2)
- Space group: Cmc2_{1}

Identification
- Color: Colorless
- Crystal habit: Platey, pseudo-hexagonal
- Twinning: Always polysynthetically twinned parallel to [001]
- Streak: White
- Diaphaneity: Transparent
- Specific gravity: 2.541
- Optical properties: Biaxial (−)
- Refractive index: nα = 1.511 nβ = 1.533 nγ = 1.535
- Birefringence: δ = 0.023
- 2V angle: Measured: 29°

Nyerereite is a very rare sodium calcium carbonate mineral with formula Na_{2}Ca(CO_{3})_{2}. It forms colorless, platey pseudohexagonal orthorhombic crystals that are typically twinned. It has a specific gravity of 2.54 and indices of refraction of nα=1.511, nβ=1.533 and nγ=1.535. Nyerereite is not stable in contact with the atmosphere and rapidly breaks down. Collection specimens must be kept in a sealed argon environment.

It has a Hermann–Mauguin notation of mm2 and the respective space group is Cmc21. In nature Nyerereite is naturally twinned and is pseudohexagonal with triad twinning; meaning that this is a six sided crystal that apparently has a hexagonal shape but is not in the hexagonal system. Triad twinning is the intergrowth of three orthorhombic crystals that turn at their center and form hexagonally shaped crystals. Nyerereite is biaxial negative, and has a 2v of 29 degrees. It shows a center acute bisectrix and a birefringence of approximately 0.023. At high temperatures or just erupted lava nyerereite is uniaxial and shows an interference color of second order blue when twinning is not present, and when twinning is there the interference color of nyerereite is first order grey.

== Special characteristics ==
Since nyerereite is very unstable when it reaches the surface it creates pseudomorphs, which is basically the process by which the rock appearance and dimensions remain constant but the main mineral component is replaced by another. McKie (1976) categorized nyerereite into two different categories, high and low nyerereite. There are two types because the Ol Doinyo Lengai lavas are very soluble and hygroscopic; when they come in contact with water or the atmosphere, the lava changes physically and chemically. Therefore, when nyerereite is at high temperature or warm we have what McKie (1976) calls high nyerereite, but when it cools down and gets hydrated we have pirssonite that has a chemical formula of Na_{2}Ca(CO_{3})_{2}·2(H_{2}O).

== Occurrence and discovery ==
It was first recognized and described by J.B. Dawson from the Ol Doinyo Lengai carbonatite lavas of Arusha Region in 1963 and named in honor of the president of Tanzania, Julius Nyerere (1922–1999). In the carbonatite lava it is associated with the potassium-bearing gregoryite. It has also been reported from the Afrikanda alkaline intrusive complex, in the Kola Peninsula, Russia.

== Bibliography ==
- Dawson, J.B., (1962) The geology of Ol Doinyo Lengai. Bulletin of Volcanologique 24,348–387.
- Simkin, T., (1994) Volcanoes of the world. Geoscience press. second edition, 20–35.
