= Gregoryite =

Anhydrous carbonate mineral that is rich in potassium and sodium

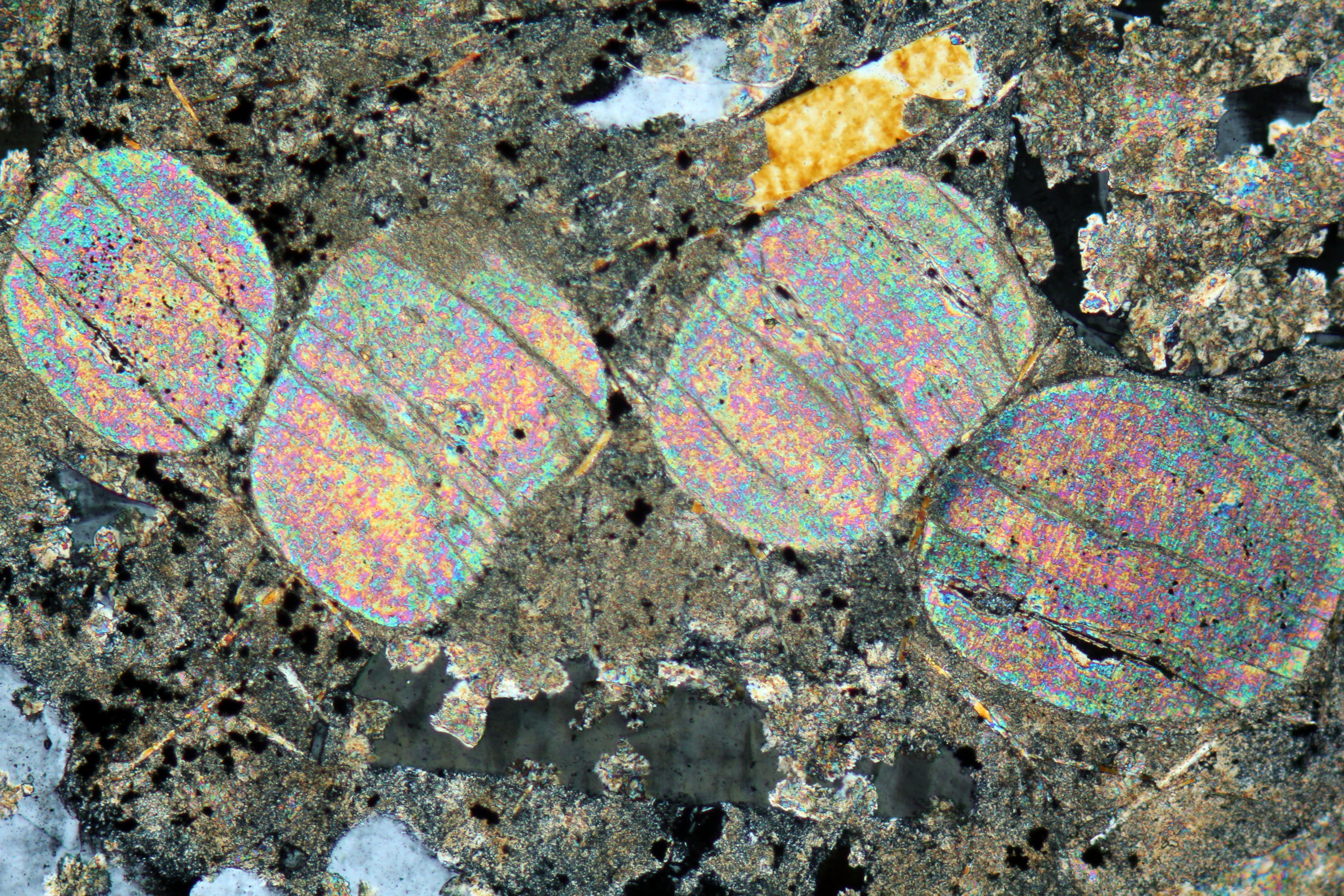

General
- Category: Carbonate mineral
- Formula: (Na_{2},K_{2},Ca)CO_{3}
- IMA symbol: Ggy
- Strunz classification: 5.AA.10
- Crystal system: Hexagonal
- Crystal class: Dihexagonal pyramidal (6mm) (same H-M symbol)
- Space group: P6_{3}mc
- Unit cell: a = 5.21 c = 6.58 [Å]; Z = 2

Identification
- Color: Brown, milky white
- Crystal habit: Phenocrysts in carbonatite lava
- Streak: White
- Diaphaneity: Transparent to translucent
- Specific gravity: 2.27 (calculated)
- Optical properties: Uniaxial
- Solubility: Soluble in water

Gregoryite is an anhydrous carbonate mineral that is rich in potassium and sodium with the chemical formula (Na_{2},K_{2},Ca)CO_{3}. It is one of the two main ingredients of natrocarbonatite, found naturally in the lava of Ol Doinyo Lengai volcano of Arusha Region, Tanzania, and the other being nyerereite.

Because of its anhydrous nature, gregoryite reacts quickly with the environment, causing the dark lava to be converted to white substance within hours.

Gregoryite was first described in 1980 and named after the British geologist and author John Walter Gregory (1864–1932), who studied the East African Rift Valley. It occurs associated with nyerereite, alabandite, halite, sylvite, fluorite and calcite.
