= Sellaite =

Halide mineral

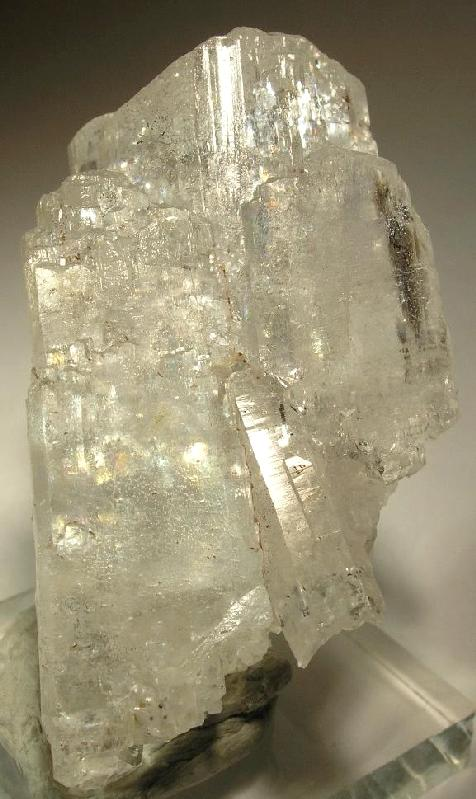
- Sellaite crystal from Serra das Éguas, Brazil (size: 4.2 × 2.4 × 2 cm)

General
- Category: Halide mineral
- Formula: MgF_{2}
- IMA symbol: Sel
- Strunz classification: 3.AB.15
- Crystal system: Tetragonal
- Crystal class: Ditetragonal dipyramidal (4/mmm); H-M symbol: (4/m 2/m 2/m)
- Space group: P4_{2}/mnm
- Unit cell: a = 4.6213(2) Å c = 3.0519(1) Å Z = 2

Identification
- Color: Colorless to white
- Crystal habit: Prismatic crystals; fibrous, radial, spherulitic
- Twinning: On {011}
- Cleavage: Perfect on {010} and {110}
- Fracture: Conchoidal
- Tenacity: Brittle
- Mohs scale hardness: 5–5.5
- Luster: Vitreous
- Diaphaneity: Transparent
- Specific gravity: 3.15
- Optical properties: Uniaxial (+)
- Refractive index: n_{ω} = 1.378 n_{ε} = 1.390
- Birefringence: δ = 0.012

Sellaite is a magnesium fluoride mineral with the formula MgF_{2}. It crystallizes in the tetragonal crystal system, typically as clear to white vitreous prisms. It may be fibrous and occur as radiating aggregates. It has a Mohs hardness of 5 to 6 and a specific gravity of 2.97 to 3.15. Refractive index values are n_{ω} = 1.378 and n_{ε} = 1.390.

== Discovery and occurrence ==
Sellaite was first described in 1868 and named for Italian mining engineer and mineralogist Quintino Sella (1827–1884). Its type locality is the glacier de Gébroulaz in France, where it occurred inside bitumen-bearing dolomite-anhydrite clasts within a moraine deposit. It has been reported in an evaporite deposit at Bleicherode; within volcanic ejecta and fumaroles at Vesuvius; in a metamorphic magnesite deposit at Serra das Éguas; and in sodic alkali granite near Gjerdingen.
