= Nephelinite =

Igneous rock made up almost entirely of nepheline and clinopyroxene

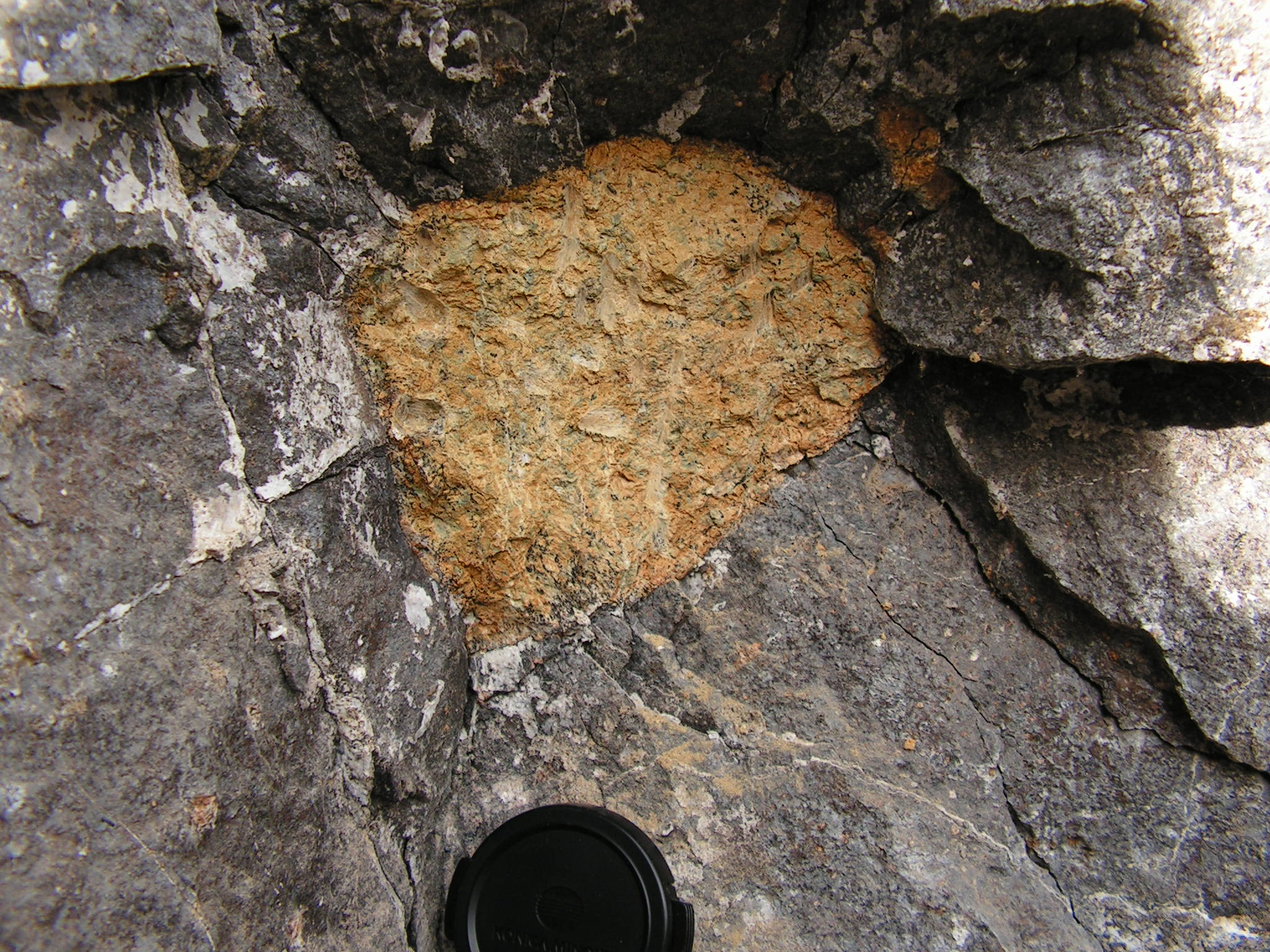
Nephelinite lava (grey) containing a xenolith of peridotite (yellow), Kaiserstuhl, Germany.

Nephelinite is a fine-grained or aphanitic igneous rock made up almost entirely of nepheline and clinopyroxene (variety augite). If olivine is present, the rock may be classified as an olivine nephelinite. Nephelinite is dark in color and may resemble basalt in hand specimen. However, basalt consists mostly of clinopyroxene (augite) and calcic plagioclase.

Basalt, alkali basalt, basanite, tephritic nephelinite, and nephelinite differ partly in the relative proportions of plagioclase and nepheline. Alkali basalt may contain minor nepheline and does contain nepheline in its CIPW normative mineralogy. A critical ratio in the classification of these rocks is the ratio nepheline/(nepheline plus plagioclase). Basanite has a value of this ratio between 0.1 and 0.6 and also contains more than 10% olivine. Tephritic nephelinite has a value between 0.6 and 0.9. Nephelinite has a value greater than 0.9. Le Maitre (2002) defines and discusses these and other criteria in the classification of igneous rocks.

Nephelinite is an example of a silica-undersaturated igneous rock. The degree of silica saturation can be evaluated with normative mineralogy calculated from chemical analyses, or with actual mineralogy for completely crystallized igneous rocks with equilibrated assemblages. Silica-oversaturated rocks contain quartz (or another silica polymorph). Silica-undersaturated mafic igneous rocks contain magnesian olivine but not magnesian orthopyroxene, and/or a feldspathoid. Silica-saturated igneous rocks fall in between these two classes.

Silica-undersaturated, mafic igneous rocks are much less abundant than silica-saturated and oversaturated basalts. Genesis of the less common mafic rocks such as nephelinite is usually ascribed to more than one of the following three causes:

- relatively high pressure of melting;
- relatively low degree of fractional melting in a mantle source;
- relatively high dissolved carbon dioxide in the melt.

Nephelinites and similar rocks typically contain relatively high concentrations of elements such as the light rare earths, as consistent with a low degree of melting of mantle peridotite at depths sufficient to stabilize garnet. Nephelinites are also associated with carbonatite in some occurrences, consistent with source rocks relatively rich in carbon dioxide.

Nephelinite is found on ocean islands such as Oʻahu, although the rock type is very rare in the Hawaiian Islands. It is found in a variety of continental settings. An example is the Hamada nephelinite lava flow in southwest Japan which occurred in the late Miocene age. Nephelinite is also associated with the highly alkalic volcanism of the Ol Doinyo Lengai volcanic field in Tanzania. Nyiragongo, another African volcano known for its semipermanent lava lake activity, erupts lava made of melilite nephelinite. The unusual chemical makeup of this igneous rock may be a factor in the unusual fluidity of its lavas.

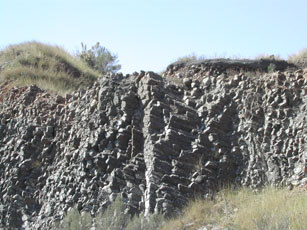
Columnar jointing in melilite-olivine nephelinite from the Southern Balcones volcanic and intrusive rocks, Uvalde County, Texas.

Olivine nephelinite flows also occur in the Wells Gray-Clearwater volcanic field in east-central British Columbia and at Volcano Mountain in central Yukon Territory. Melilite olivine nephelinite intrusives of Cretaceous age are found in the area around Uvalde, Texas.

== Bibliography ==
- Flett, John Smith (1911). "Nephelinites" . In Chisholm, Hugh (ed.). Encyclopædia Britannica. Vol. 19 (11th ed.). Cambridge University Press. p. 384.
