= Ijolite =

Igneous rock consisting essentially of nepheline and augite

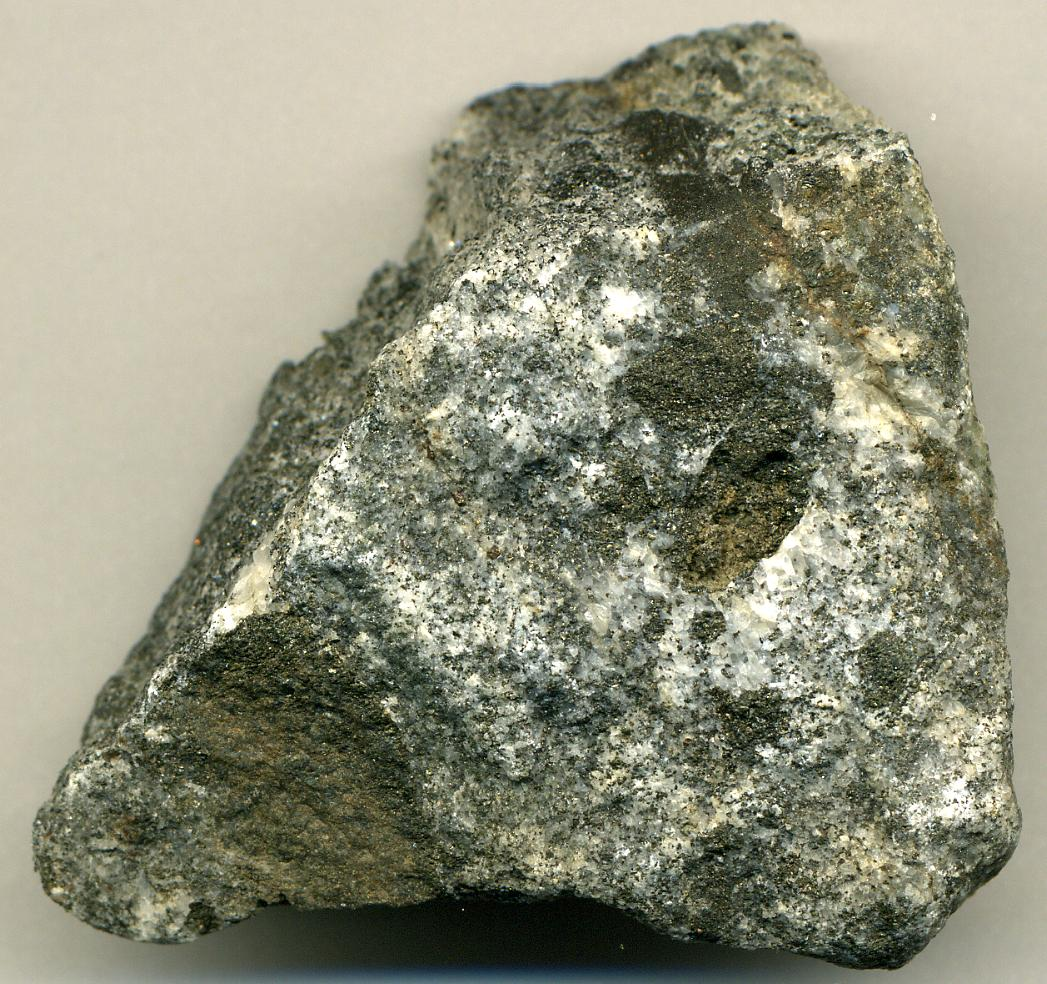
Ijolite (Oka Carbonatite Complex, Early Cretaceous, 124-125 Ma; Oka Niobium Mine, Quebec, Canada)

Ijolite is an igneous rock consisting essentially of nepheline and augite. Ijolite is a rare rock type of considerable importance from a mineralogical and petrological standpoint. The word is derived from the first syllable of the Finnish words such as Iivaara, Iijoki · and Ii, all geographical names in Finland, and the Ancient Greek Xiflos, a stone. Ijolite occurs in various parts of the Kainuu region of eastern Finland and in the Kola Peninsula of northwest Russia on the shores of the White Sea. Ijolite was first defined and named by Finnish geologist Wilhelm Ramsay.

The pyroxene is morphic, yellow or green, and is surrounded by formless areas of nepheline. The accessory minerals are apatite, cancrinite, calcite, titanite and schorlomite, a dark-brown titaniferous variety of melanite-garnet. This rock is the plutonic and holo-crystalline analogue of the nephelinites -volcanic equivalent and nepheline-dolerites; it bears the same relation to them as the nepheline syenites have to the phonolites.

A leucite-augite rock, resembling ijolite except in containing leucite in place of nepheline, is known to occur at Shonkin Creek, near Fort Benton, Montana, and was earlier called missourite, but is now regarded as a variety of leucitite.
