= Gail McConnell =

Scottish physicist and professor

Gail McConnell FRSE FInstP FRMS
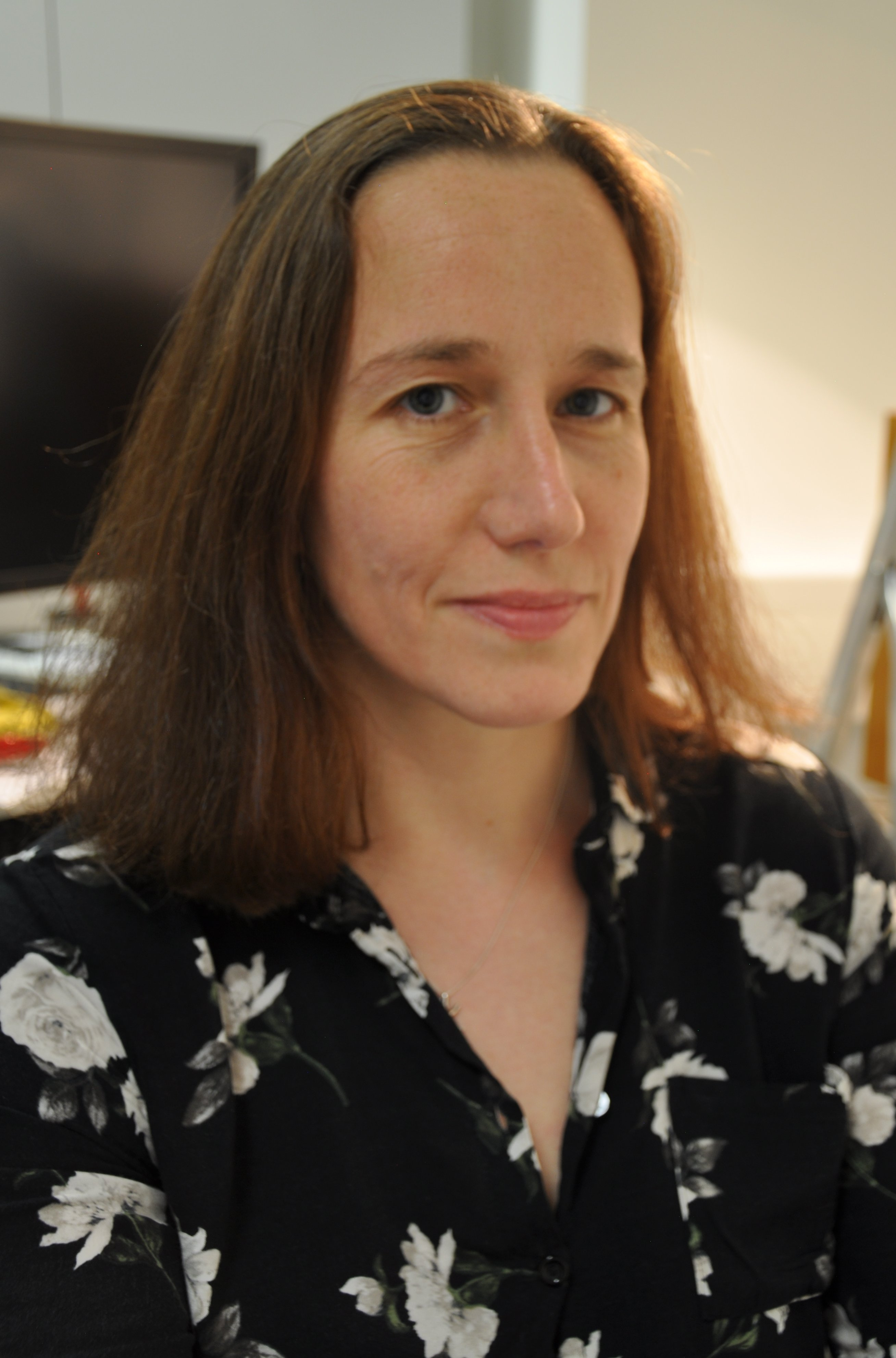
- Born: 25 August 1976 (age 50)
- Education: University of Strathclyde (BSc, PhD)
- Scientific career
- Fields: Biophotonics; Microscopy
- Workplaces: University of Strathclyde
- Thesis: Nonlinear optical frequency conversion of mode-locked all-solid-state lasers (2001)
- Doctoral advisor: Allister Ferguson
- Website: strathclydemesolab.com

Gail McConnell FRSE FInstP FRMS (born 25 August 1976) is a Scottish physicist who is Professor of Physics and director of the Centre for Biophotonics at the University of Strathclyde. She is interested in optical microscopy and novel imaging techniques, and leads the Mesolens microscope facility where her research investigates linear and non-linear optics.

== Early life and education ==
McConnell credits her high school physics teacher with her inspiration to study science. She studied optoelectronics and laser physics at the University of Strathclyde, where she was taught by Carol Trager-Cowan. She remained there for her graduate studies, earning a PhD in laser technology under the supervision of Allister Ferguson in 2002. She was the first member of her family to go to university.

== Career and research ==
McConnell almost worked in telecommunications, but was convinced by Ferguson to join Strathclyde's new Centre for Biophotonics. She became interested in biomedical research and increasingly aware of the limitations of commercial imaging. Here she worked with Alison Gurney on the development of confocal, multi-photon wide-field microscopes. Gurney encouraged McConnell to apply for fellowships, and she was a Royal Society of Edinburgh and Research Councils UK (RCUK) postdoctoral fellow. She developed the world's first white light supercontinuum laser that could be used for confocal microscopy, as well as laser scanning fluorescence microscopy. She attended the European Molecular Biology Laboratory (EMBL) Practical Course in Advanced Optical Microscopy in Plymouth, which she has continued to support throughout her academic career.

McConnell directs the Centre for Biophotonics and Mesolens laboratory at the University of Strathclyde, working on nonlinear and linear optical instrumentation for biomedical imaging. Nonlinear optics allows physicists precise control of excitation parameters, including the chance to tune the duration of laser pules.

In 2009, McConnell began working with William Bradshaw Amos and built a new lens, Mesolens, that can allow 3D imaging with a depth resolution of a few microns for objects up to 6 mm wide and 3 mm thick. The Mesolens is a giant optical microscope objective supported by the Medical Research Council (MRC). It can be used to image large biomedical specimens, including embryos, tumours and areas in brain, as well as scanning large areas of samples in a short amount of time. The lens has 260 megapixel effective camera and a magic ratio of 8:1, which can even resolve individual bacteria. As the photometric volume can sample such a large area with sub-cellular detail, the Mesolens may allow for the imaging of rare events. Mesolens became a University spin-off, but McConnell decided to stay in academia to explore the physics of biomedical processes. The Mesolens generates such large amounts of data that McConnell became interested in computational biology. The Mesolens was selected by Physics World as one of the top achievements of 2016. She discussed the Mesolens on the podcast Not Exactly Rocket Science.

Alongside the Mesolens, McConnell has explored how laser sources can be used to open voltage-gated ion channels, such as Calcium-activated potassium channels. She has developed a fast-acquisition version of two-photon excitation microscopy that can be used to image at rates of 100 frames/second. She created polymer hydrogel beads that are responsive to enzymes. She is working with the Medical Research Scotland to create high brightness light-emitting diodes.

In May 2012, she was appointed Professor and Director of the Centre for Biophotonics at the University of Strathclyde. She leads the Strathclyde Theme of Physics and Life Sciences and is part of the Engineering and Physical Sciences Research Council (EPSRC) Centre for Doctoral Training in Optical Medical Imaging.

=== Awards and honours ===
In recognition of her work, McConnell was elected a Fellow of the Institute of Physics (FInstP) in 2010, a Fellow of the Royal Society of Edinburgh (FRSE) in 2019 and a Fellow of the Royal Microscopical Society (FRMS).
