= Electron channelling contrast imaging =

Microscope diffraction technique

Electron channelling contrast imaging (ECCI) is a scanning electron microscope (SEM) diffraction technique used in the study of defects in materials. These can be dislocations or stacking faults that are close to the surface of the sample, low angle grain boundaries or atomic steps. Unlike the use of transmission electron microscopy (TEM) for the investigation of dislocations, the ECCI approach has been called a rapid and non-destructive characterisation technique

== Mechanism ==
The word channelling in ECCI, and, similarly, in electron channelling patterns refers to diffraction of the electron beam on its way in the sample. With enough spatial resolution, very small crystal imperfections would change the phase of the incident electron wave-function, and this, in turn, would be reflected in the backscattering probability, showing up as contrast (sharp change in backscattered intensity) close to a dislocation

== Background ==
While we now talk about ECCI being a SEM technique, there was a significant gap of about thirty years between the prediction that defects ought to show up as contrast in the backscattered electron micrographs of the SEM and the development of ECCI as an accessible technique for the user of a standard SEM. In the meanwhile the field emission gun (FEG) had to be developed and integrated in the commercial SEM in order to improve the spatial resolution for channelling applications.

Shortly after, Wilkinson used ECCI to investigate clusters of misfit dislocations lying more than 1 μm underneath the surface at the interface of Si-Ge layers grown on Si. They noted that at this depth the spatial resolution is too low to resolve individual dislocations. However, they still concluded that the $\mathbf{g} \cdot \mathbf{b} = \mathbf{g} \cdot \mathbf{b} \times \mathbf{u} = 0$ invisibility criteria can be applied similarly to TEM. These pioneering ECCI investigations were made on highly tilted samples ($40^{\circ} - 70^{\circ}$), with side-mounted backscattered electron (BSE) detectors, similarly to the electron backscatter diffraction (EBSD) set up.

When applied to metals ECCI tended to be used in a low tilt ( $<10^{\circ}$ ) configuration. This set up offers a number of advantages: the standard Si-diode detector can be mounted on the pole piece offering a large BSE signal collection angle and the interaction volume is minimised granting higher spatial resolution. The downside to this geometry is the reduction in BSE signal which, for metals, is less of an issue than for semiconductors due to higher atomic numbers. A comprehensive overview of the applications of ECCI for metallic materials has been made by Weidner and Biermann.

From 2006 Trager-Cowan's group showed that using ECCI in the characterisation of nitrides is an excellent idea. Since then ECCI has been used in the forescatter geometry to reveal extended defects and morphological features of GaN samples. Picard et al. also argued that the $\mathbf{g} \cdot\mathbf{b}$ dislocation type identification criterion can no longer be applied due to surface relaxation. Instead, they used simulations to determine the Burger vectors of dislocations, laying the grounds for a non-destructive dislocation characterisation method.

Literature continues to call ECCI a new technique even though it has been around for almost forty years. There are a number of reasons for this including the fact that it resisted being standardised such that every group has their own method of acquiring ECC-micrographs depending on the material studied, the SEM abilities and the available detectors. Different groups proposed flavours of ECCI to distinguish between procedures. Gutierrez-Urrutia et al. and Zaefferer and Elhami coined the term controlled ECCI (cECCI) for a low tilt geometry ECCI aided by crystallographic information obtained form EBSD maps acquired at $70^{\circ}$ tilt. Similarly, Mansour et al. used low tilt ECCI together with high resolution selected area channelling patterns to characterise dislocations in fine-grained Si steel and labelled it accurate ECCI (aECCI).
