= Carol Trager-Cowan =

Scottish physicist

Carol Trager-Cowan FRSE FInstP FRMS
- Born: Carol Trager
- Education: University of Glasgow (BSc); University of St Andrews (MSc); Royal Holloway, University of London (PhD)
- Scientific career
- Workplaces: University of Strathclyde
- Thesis: The study of novel electrostatic electron lenses (1987)
- Doctoral advisor: Doug Heddle
- Website: www.strath.ac.uk/staff/trager-cowancaroldr

Carol Trager-Cowan FRSE FInstP FRMS is a Scottish physicist who is a Reader (Associate Professor) in physics and Science Communicator at the University of Strathclyde. She works on scanning electron microscopy, including Electron backscatter diffraction (EBSD), diffraction contrast and cathodoluminescence imaging.

== Education and early career ==
Trager-Cowan was an undergraduate student at the University of Glasgow, where she earned a bachelor's degree in natural philosophy in 1983. She moved to the University of St Andrews for her graduate studies, earning a master's degree in 1984. Her dissertation considered hot electrons in Gallium arsenide. She moved to Royal Holloway, University of London for her doctorate, completing her thesis on electrostatic electron lenses in 1987 supervised by Doug Heddle. She completed experimental and theoretical investigations into electrostatic lenses.

== Research and career ==
Trager-Cowan is a Reader (Associate Professor) in Physics at the University of Strathclyde. She develops fast, non-destructive characterisation techniques to study crystalline materials. In particular, Trager-Cowan works on nitride semiconductor thin films. Nitride semiconducting films form the basis of solid-state lighting, satellite communications and cable television. The performance of nitride light emitting devices depends on the number of extended defects, which can cause scattering of light or charges and result in poor device performance with short lifetimes. Defects limit device performance due to non-radiative recombination and high leakage currents. Extended defects including threading and partial dislocations, grain boundaries and stacking faults, and can be electrically active. Trager-Cowan develops sensitive characterisation techniques that can detect nanoscale defects, including electron backscatter diffraction and electron channeling contrast imaging. These make it possible to uncover the structure, texture and strain within semiconducting crystals. Trager-Cowan uses the Timepix semiconductor hybrid pixel detector developed by CERN. Timepix allows direct electron detection with exceptional detail. Electron channeling contrast imaging allows Trager-Cowan to analyse the failure mechanisms in nanoscale electronic devices. Trager-Cowan is a member of ManuGaN, a multi-university collaboration to fabricate gallium nitride on a manufacturing scale.

=== Public engagement and outreach ===
Trager-Cowan is involved in public engagement and outreach, delivering popular science lectures and running science workshops with schools. She was described by Gail McConnell as an inspiration. Trager-Cowan has worked with the Royal Philosophical Society of Glasgow, Glasgow Science Festival and European Researchers Night. In 2007 she was named the "Strathclyder of the Year" in recognition for her work encouraging school students to study physics. She is an elected member of AcademiaNet and the University of Strathclyde Women in Science and Engineering group.

=== Awards and honours ===
In recognition of her public engagement, Trager-Cowan was elected a Fellow of the Royal Society of Edinburgh (FRSE) in 2014. She is a Fellow of the Institute of Physics (FInstP) and the Royal Microscopical Society.
