= Scanning electron microscope =

Type of electron microscope

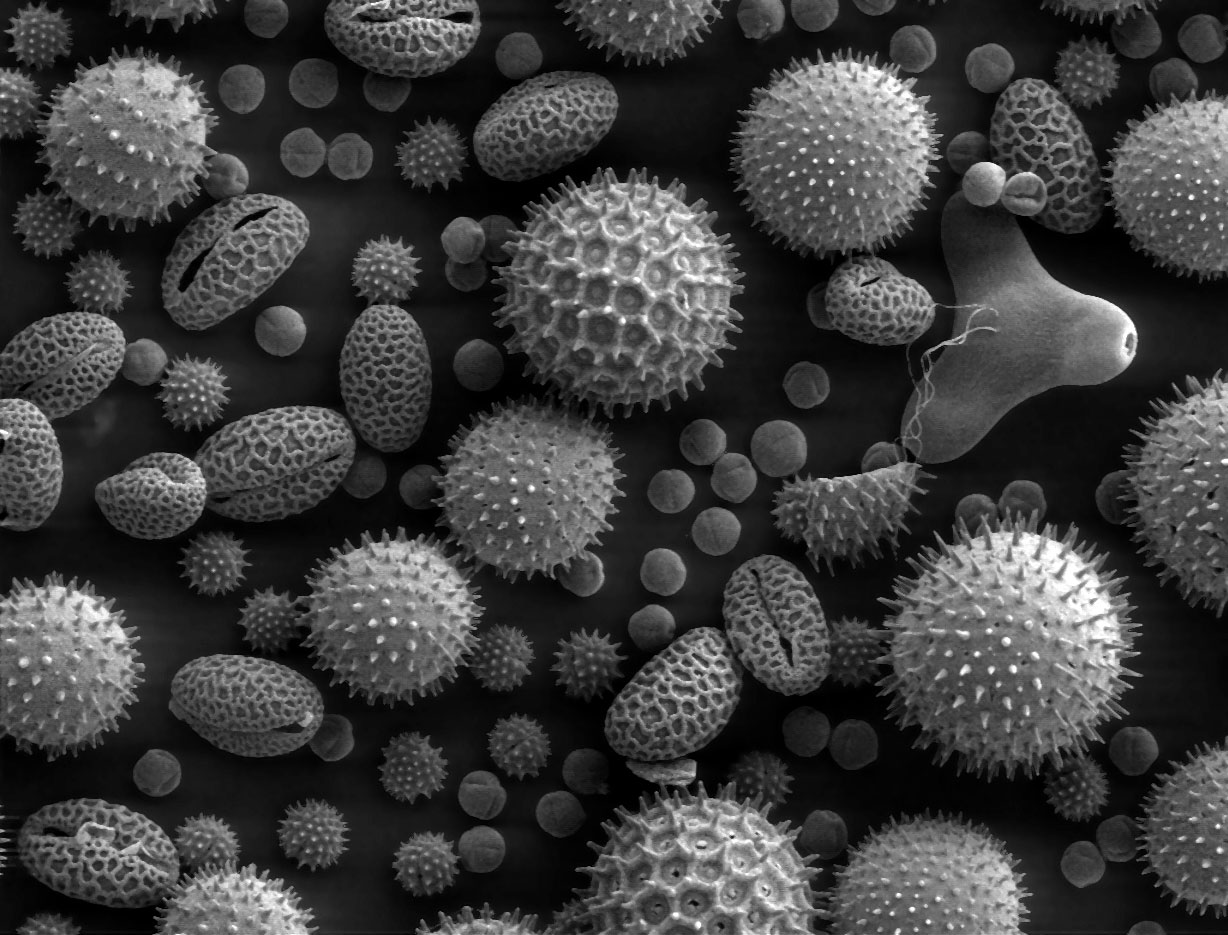
Image of pollen grains taken on a SEM shows the characteristic depth of field of SEM micrographs

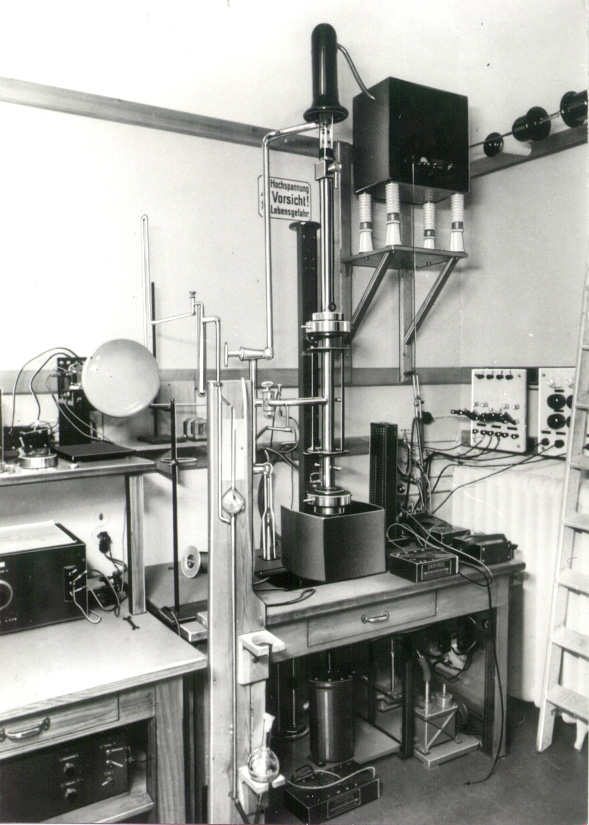
M. von Ardenne's first SEM

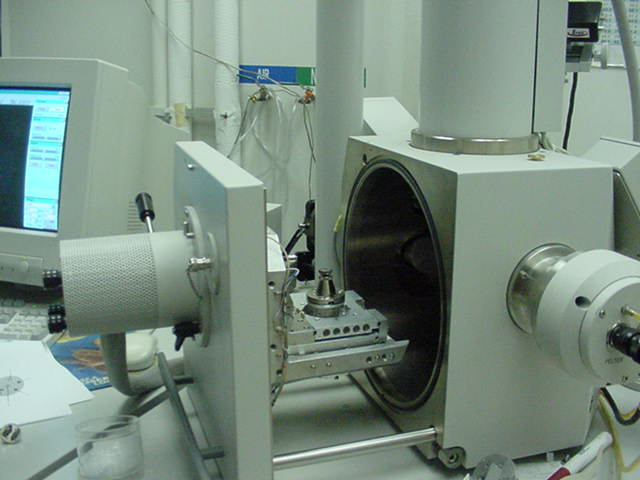
SEM with opened sample chamber

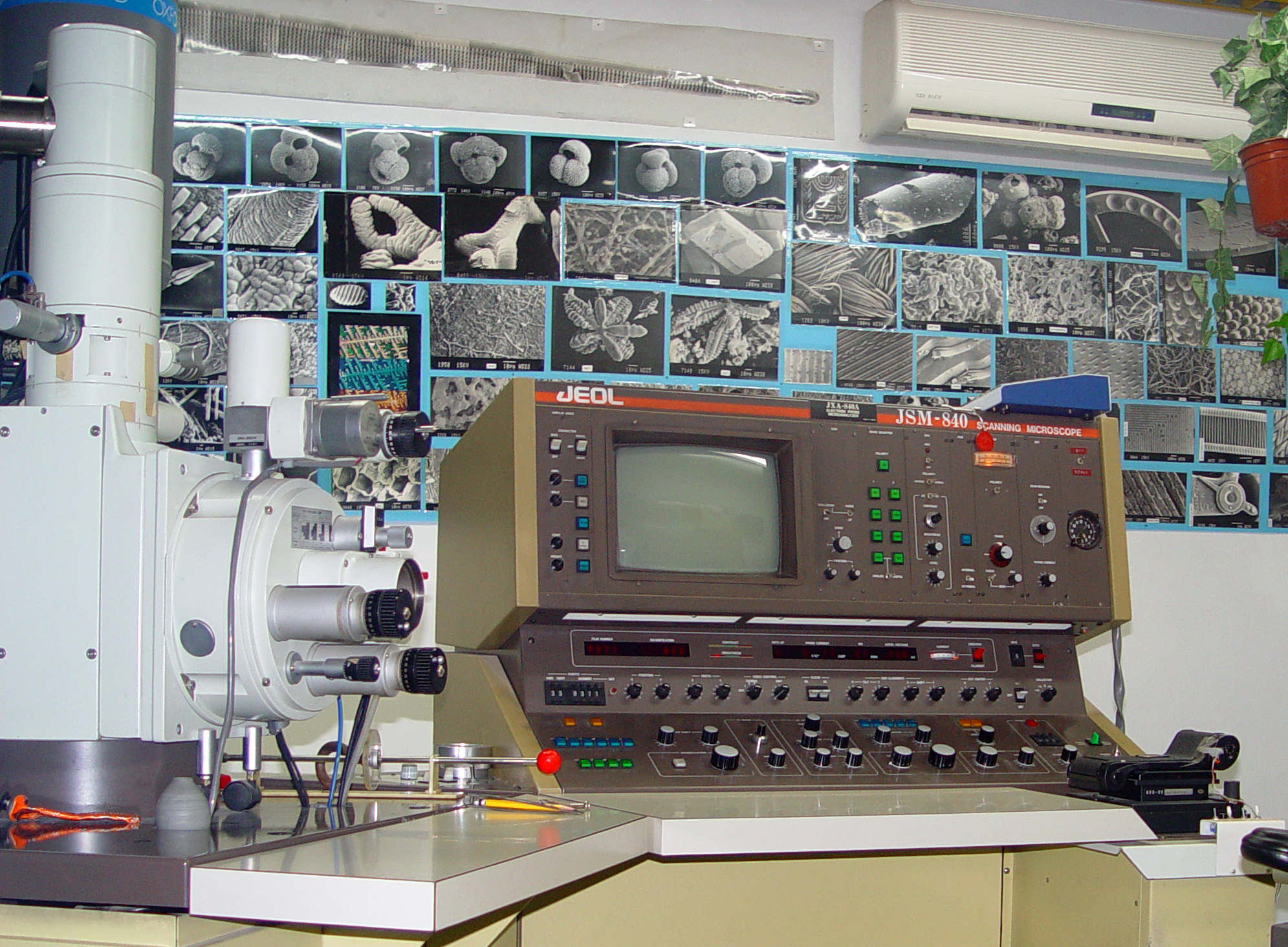
Analog type SEM

A scanning electron microscope (SEM) is a type of electron microscope that produces images of a sample by scanning the surface with a focused beam of electrons. The electrons interact with atoms in the sample, producing various signals that contain information about the surface topography and composition. The electron beam is scanned in a raster scan pattern, and the position of the beam is combined with the intensity of the detected signal to produce an image. In the most common SEM mode, secondary electrons emitted by atoms excited by the electron beam are detected using a secondary electron detector (Everhart–Thornley detector). The number of secondary electrons that can be detected, and thus the signal intensity, depends, among other things, on specimen topography. Some SEMs can achieve resolutions better than 1 nanometer.

Specimens are observed in high vacuum in a conventional SEM, or in low vacuum or wet conditions in a variable pressure or environmental SEM, and at a wide range of cryogenic or elevated temperatures with specialized instruments.

== History ==
An account of the early history of scanning electron microscopy has been presented by McMullan. Although Max Knoll produced a photo with a 50 mm object-field-width showing channeling contrast by the use of an electron beam scanner, it was Manfred von Ardenne who in 1937 invented a microscope with high resolution by scanning a very small raster with a demagnified and finely focused electron beam. In the same year, Cecil E. Hall also completed the construction of the first emission microscope in North America, just two years after being tasked by his supervisor, E. F. Burton at the University of Toronto. Ardenne applied scanning of the electron beam in an attempt to surpass the resolution of the transmission electron microscope (TEM), as well as to mitigate substantial problems with chromatic aberration inherent to real imaging in the TEM. He further discussed the various detection modes, possibilities and theory of SEM, together with the construction of the first high resolution SEM. Further work was reported by Zworykin's group, followed by the Cambridge groups in the 1950s and early 1960s headed by Charles Oatley, all of which finally led to the marketing of the first commercial instrument by Cambridge Scientific Instrument Company as the "Stereoscan" in 1965, which was delivered to DuPont.

== Principles and capacities ==
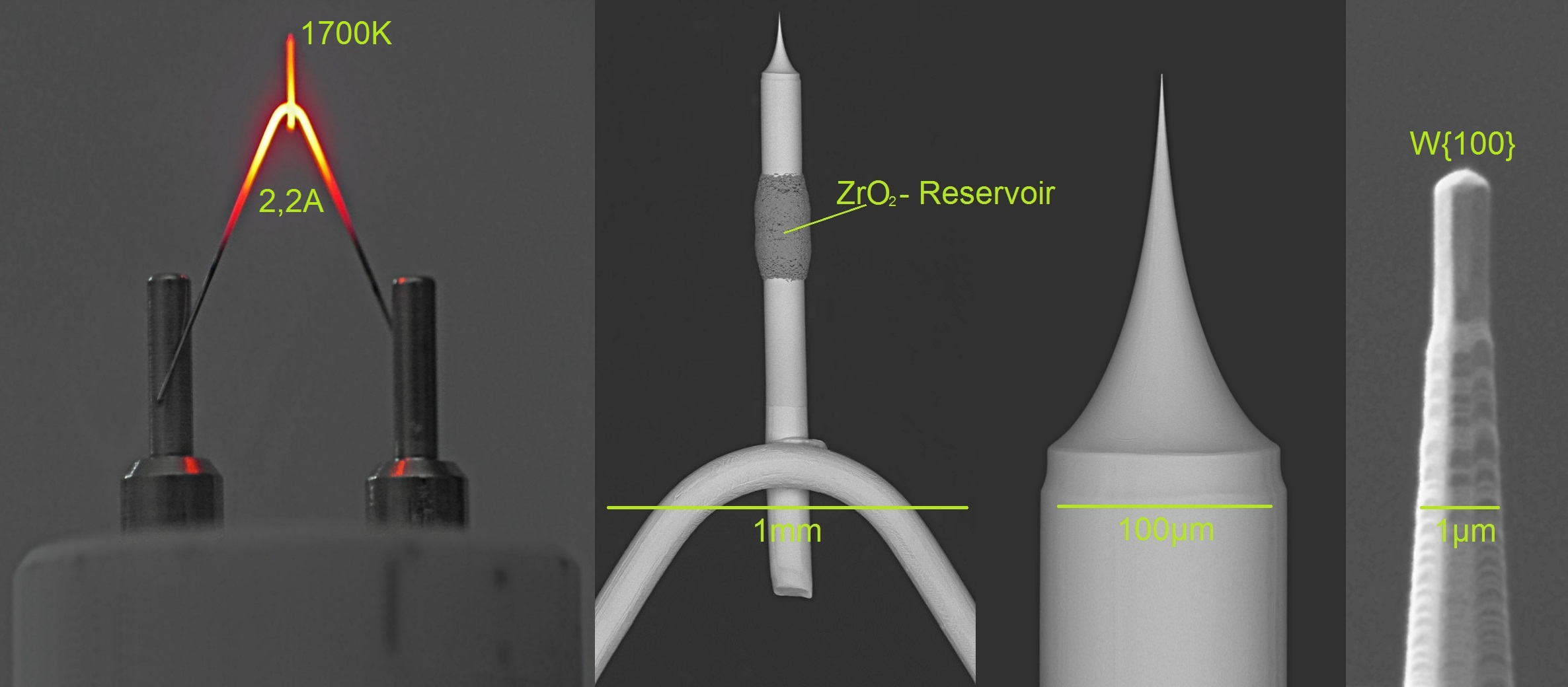
Schottky-emitter electron source

Electron–matter interaction volume and types of signal generated

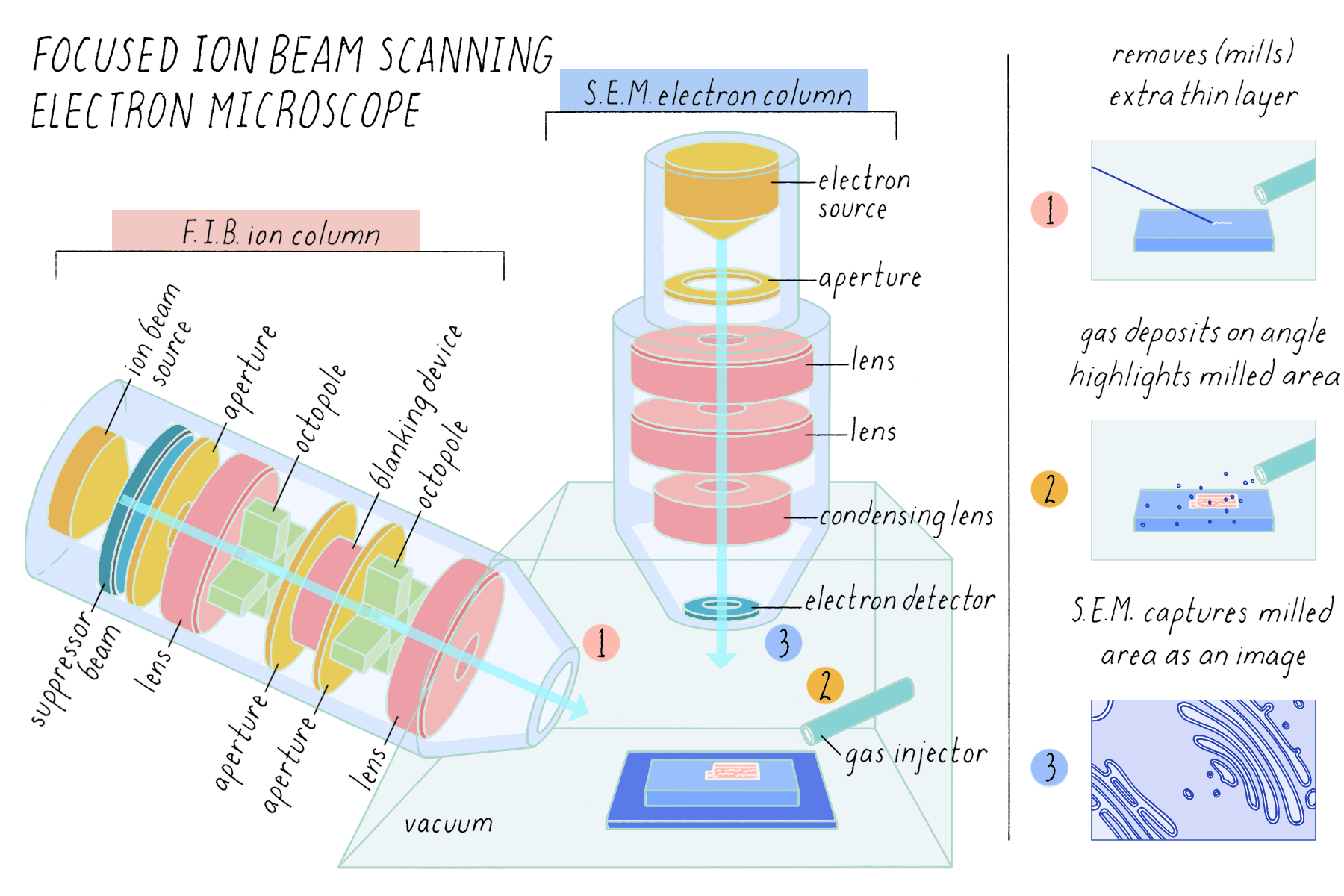
Detail of a modified scanning electron microscope in which a beam of ions hits a sample and removes materials in a controlled way.

The signals used by an SEM to make an image result from interactions between the electron beam and atoms at various depths within the sample. Various types of signals are produced including secondary electrons (SE), reflected or back-scattered electrons (BSE), characteristic X-rays and light (cathodoluminescence) (CL), absorbed current (specimen current) and transmitted electrons. Secondary electron imaging and back-scattered electron detectors are standard approaches in an SEM, but additional detectors may be used to capture additional signals. For instance, emitted X-rays can be detected by energy dispersive X-ray spectrometry.

Secondary electrons have very low energies on the order of 50 eV, which limits their mean free path in solid matter. Consequently, SEs can only escape from the top few nanometers of the surface of a sample. The signal from secondary electrons tends to be highly localized at the point of impact of the primary electron beam, making it possible to collect images of the sample surface with a resolution of below 1 nm. Back-scattered electrons (BSE) are beam electrons that are reflected from the sample by elastic scattering. Since they have much higher energy than SEs, they emerge from deeper locations within the specimen and, consequently, the resolution of BSE images is less than SE images. However, BSE are often used in analytical SEM, along with the spectra made from the characteristic X-rays, because the intensity of the BSE signal is strongly related to the atomic number (Z) of the specimen. BSE images can provide information about the distribution, but not the identity, of different elements in the sample. In samples predominantly composed of light elements, such as biological specimens, BSE imaging can image colloidal gold immuno-labels of 5 or 10 nm diameter, which would otherwise be difficult or impossible to detect in secondary electron images. Characteristic X-rays are emitted when the electron beam removes an inner shell electron from the sample, causing a higher-energy electron to fill the shell and release energy. The energy or wavelength of these characteristic X-rays can be measured by Energy-dispersive X-ray spectroscopy or Wavelength-dispersive X-ray spectroscopy and used to identify and measure the abundance of elements in the sample and map their distribution.

Due to the very narrow electron beam, SEM micrographs have a large depth of field yielding a characteristic three-dimensional appearance useful for understanding the surface structure of a sample. This is exemplified by the micrograph of pollen shown above. A wide range of magnifications is possible, from about 10 times (about equivalent to that of a powerful hand-lens) to more than 500,000 times, about 250 times the magnification limit of the best light microscopes.

== Sample preparation ==
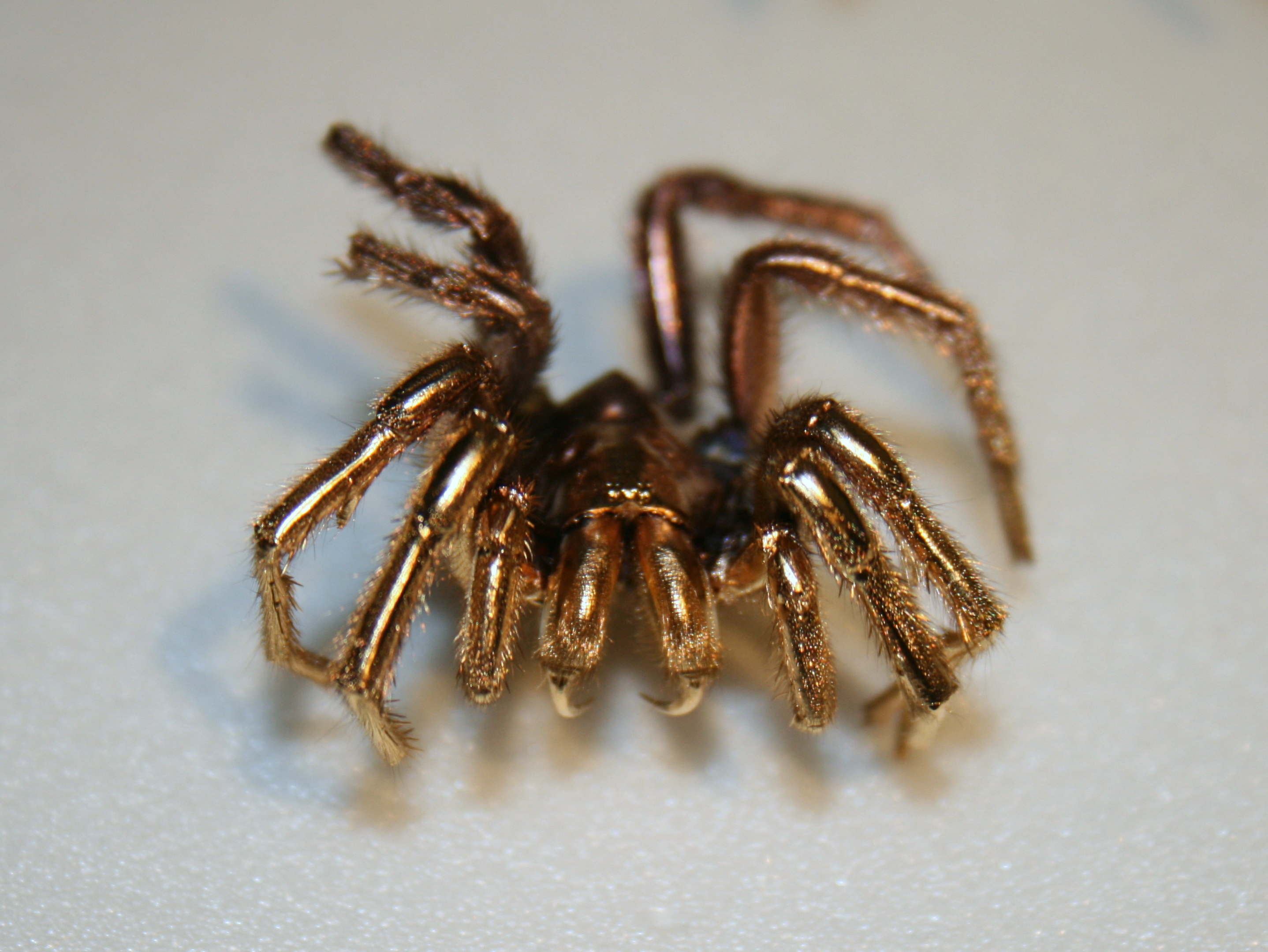
A spider sputter-coated in gold, having been prepared for viewing with an SEM

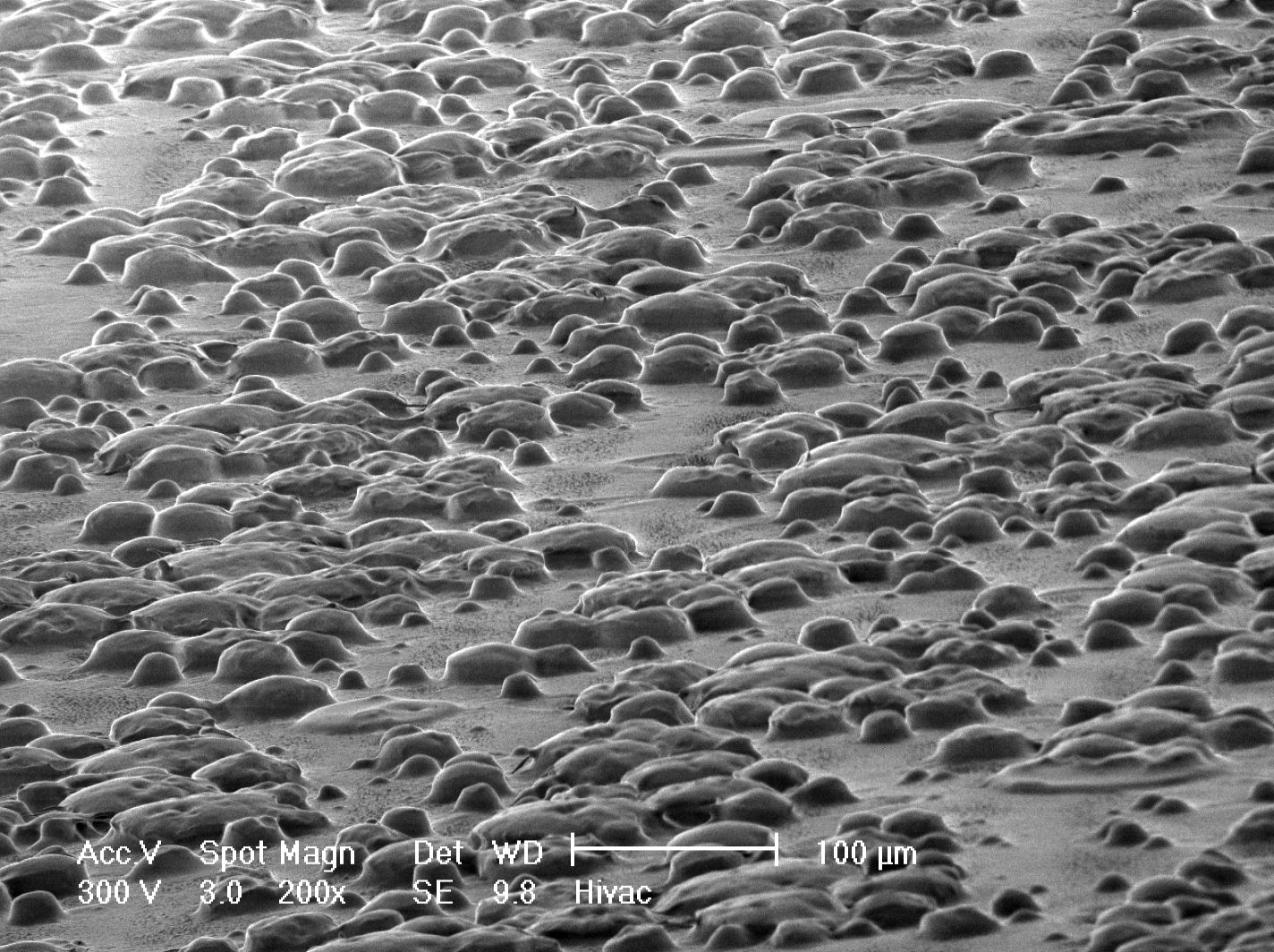
Low-voltage micrograph (300 V) of distribution of adhesive droplets on a Post-it note. No conductive coating was applied: such a coating would alter this fragile specimen.

SEM samples have to be small enough to fit on the sample stage, secured with a conductive paint. The relatively low vacuum (0.076 to 20 torr) of Variable-Pressure and Environmental SEM obviates the need for cleaning, even those with water or oily films, allowing observation in a natural state. Preparation is identical to the steps used in light microscopy polished samples. SEM techniques can be used to examine integrated circuit condition and attachment points. Foreshortening is achieved by tilting any specimen. Sputter coating is used to apply a thin coating of metal, or metal alloy, to nonconductive specimens. Conductive materials in current use for specimen coating include gold, gold/palladium alloy, platinum, iridium, tungsten, chromium, osmium.. An alternative to coating for some biological samples is to increase the bulk conductivity of the material by impregnation with osmium using variants of the OTO staining method (O-osmium tetroxide, T-thiocarbohydrazide, O-osmium).

=== Biological samples ===
Since the SEM specimen chamber is under high vacuum, a SEM specimen must be completely dry or cryogenically cooled. Hard, dry materials such as wood, bone, feathers, dried insects, or shells (including egg shells) can be examined with little further treatment, but living cells and tissues and whole, soft-bodied organisms require chemical fixation to preserve and stabilize their structure.

Fixation is usually performed by incubation in a solution of a buffered chemical fixative, such as glutaraldehyde, sometimes in combination with formaldehyde and other fixatives, and optionally followed by postfixation with osmium tetroxide. The fixed tissue is then dehydrated. Because air-drying causes collapse and shrinkage, this is commonly achieved by replacement of water in the cells with organic solvents such as ethanol or acetone, and replacement of these solvents in turn with a transitional fluid such as liquid carbon dioxide by critical point drying. The carbon dioxide is finally removed while in a supercritical state, so that no gas–liquid interface is present within the sample during drying.

The dry specimen is usually mounted on a specimen stub using an adhesive such as epoxy resin or electrically conductive double-sided adhesive tape, and sputter-coated with gold or gold/palladium alloy before examination in the microscope. Samples may be sectioned (with a microtome) if information about the organism's internal ultrastructure is to be exposed for imaging.

If the SEM is equipped with a cold stage for cryo microscopy, cryofixation may be used and low-temperature scanning electron microscopy performed on the cryogenically fixed specimens. Cryo-fixed specimens may be cryo-fractured under vacuum in a special apparatus to reveal internal structure, sputter-coated and transferred onto the SEM cryo-stage while still frozen. Low-temperature scanning electron microscopy (LT-SEM) is also applicable to the imaging of temperature-sensitive materials such as ice and fats.

Freeze-fracturing, freeze-etch or freeze-and-break is a preparation method particularly useful for examining lipid membranes and their incorporated proteins in "face on" view. The preparation method reveals the proteins embedded in the lipid bilayer.

=== Materials ===
According to Goldstein et al, "There are many ways to section the samples, including blade sawing, wire sawing, abrasive cutting, fracturing (best for more brittle materials), shearing, spark erosion, and microtomy. The surface to be prepared for microstructural analysis is polished using a graded sequence of abrasive materials. Ceramic and geological samples, like metals, may require etching to permit microstructural features to be imaged or analyzed in the SEM." However, the electron beam path from the specimen surface to ground must remain unbroken to ensure the specimen does not act like an electron mirror when sufficient charge builds up equal to that of the incident beam, which is referred to as "charging." According to Goldstein et al, "The best and simplest way to overcome charging problems is to deposit a thin metal layer on the surface of the sample." This is achieved via vacuum evaporation coating or sputter coating. For elements with atomic numbers 8 through 20, only carbon, aluminum and chromium are suitable coating materials.

FIB is analogous to SEM, but with the use of positively charged ions instead of electrons. Besides imaging, FIB can be used for precision cutting, etching, or depositing conductive materials on the sample surface.

== Scanning process and image formation ==
Schematic of an SEM

The SEM consists of an electron column, with the electron gun, electron lenses and vacuum pumps, plus a control console, with viewing screen and electron beam controls. The electron gun generates and accelerates electrons between 0.1 to 30 keV. Electron lenses focus the electron beam to less than 10 nm at the sample, where it interacts with the specimen to a depth of about 1 micrometre, generating signals used for point by point imaging. Deflection coils sweep the electron beam across the specimen in a raster scan fashion, with the backscattered and secondary electrons collected by the electron detector, forming an image that can be processed and displayed digitally. Sharpness and feature visibility are controlled by electron probe size, electron probe current, electron probe convergence angle and electron beam accelerating voltage. According to Goldstein et al, "Most older SEMs use tungsten or LaB_{6} thermionic emitters, but, increasingly, new microscopes are equipped with cold, thermal, or Schottly field emission sources because these provide enhanced performance, reliability, and lifetime."

Mechanisms of emission of secondary electrons, backscattered electrons, and characteristic X-rays from atoms of the sample

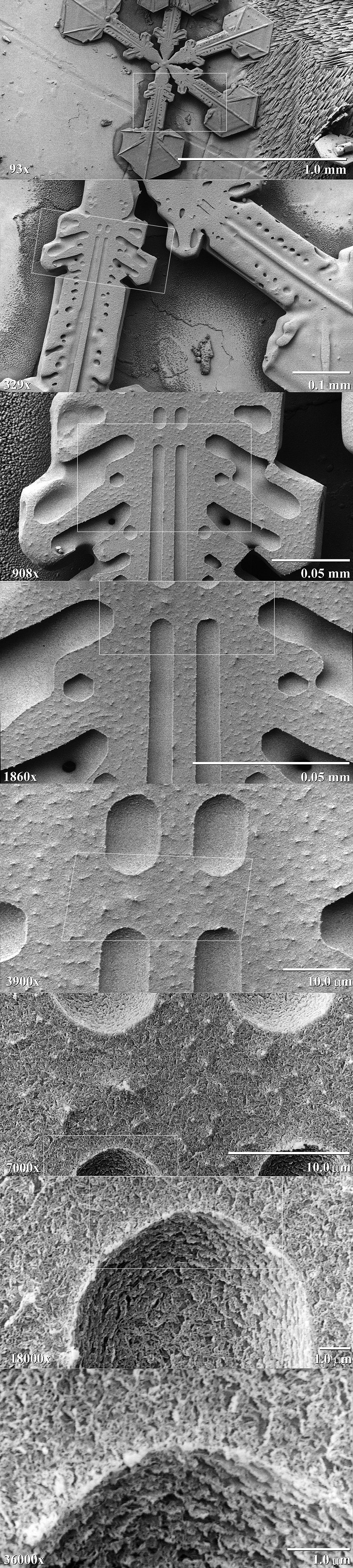
Low-temperature SEM magnification series for a snow crystal. The crystals are captured, stored, and sputter-coated with platinum at cryogenic temperatures for imaging.

=== Magnification ===
Magnification in an SEM can be controlled over a range of about 6 orders of magnitude from about 10 to 3,000,000 times. Changing magnification is achieved by adjusting the length of the scan on the specimen, with higher magnification requiring a smaller sample area, or pixel.

== Detection of secondary electrons ==
The most common imaging mode collects low-energy (<50 eV) secondary electrons that are ejected from conduction or valence bands of the specimen atoms by inelastic scattering interactions with beam electrons. Due to their low energy, these electrons originate from within a few nanometers below the sample surface. The electrons are detected by an Everhart–Thornley detector. According to Goldstein et al, "The development of the E-T detector provided the first efficient use of the rich secondary/backscattered electron signal with a large solid angle of collection, high amplifier gain, low noise, and robust, low-maintenance performance." Light is emitted when an energetic electron strikes scintillator material, which is conducted via a light guide to a photomultiplier, which provides high gain, little noise degradation, high bandwidth, at a fast response rate.

== Detection of backscattered electrons ==
Comparison of SEM techniques: Top: backscattered electron analysis – composition Bottom: secondary electron analysis – topography

Backscattered electrons (BSE) consist of high-energy electrons originating in the electron beam, that are reflected or back-scattered out of the specimen interaction volume by elastic scattering interactions with specimen atoms. Since heavy elements (high atomic number) backscatter electrons more strongly than light elements (low atomic number), and thus appear brighter in the image, BSEs are used to detect contrast between areas with different chemical compositions. According to Goldstein et al, "When the E-T detector is biased negatively, only backscattered electrons are detected. All secondary electrons are rejected, including those that are emitted from the specimen in the direction of the E-T detector within the line-of-sight solid angle for direct geometric collection. Dedicated backscattered electron detectors are designed to greatly increase the solid angle of collection." These include the Passive Scintillator Backscattered Electron Detectors, the Backscattered-to-Secondary Electron Conversion Detector, and the Solid State Diode Detector.

Backscattered electrons can also be used to form an electron backscatter diffraction (EBSD) image that can be used to determine the crystallographic structure of the specimen.

== Beam-injection analysis of semiconductors ==
Voltage contrast and charge collection SEM microscopy are used to characterize the electrical performance of integrated circuits and semiconductor devices. Charge collection uses the currents or voltages induced in the specimen by the electron beam. Electron beam induced current (EBIC) is used to study Schottky barriers, diffused, and ion-implanted p-n junctions.

== Cathodoluminescence ==
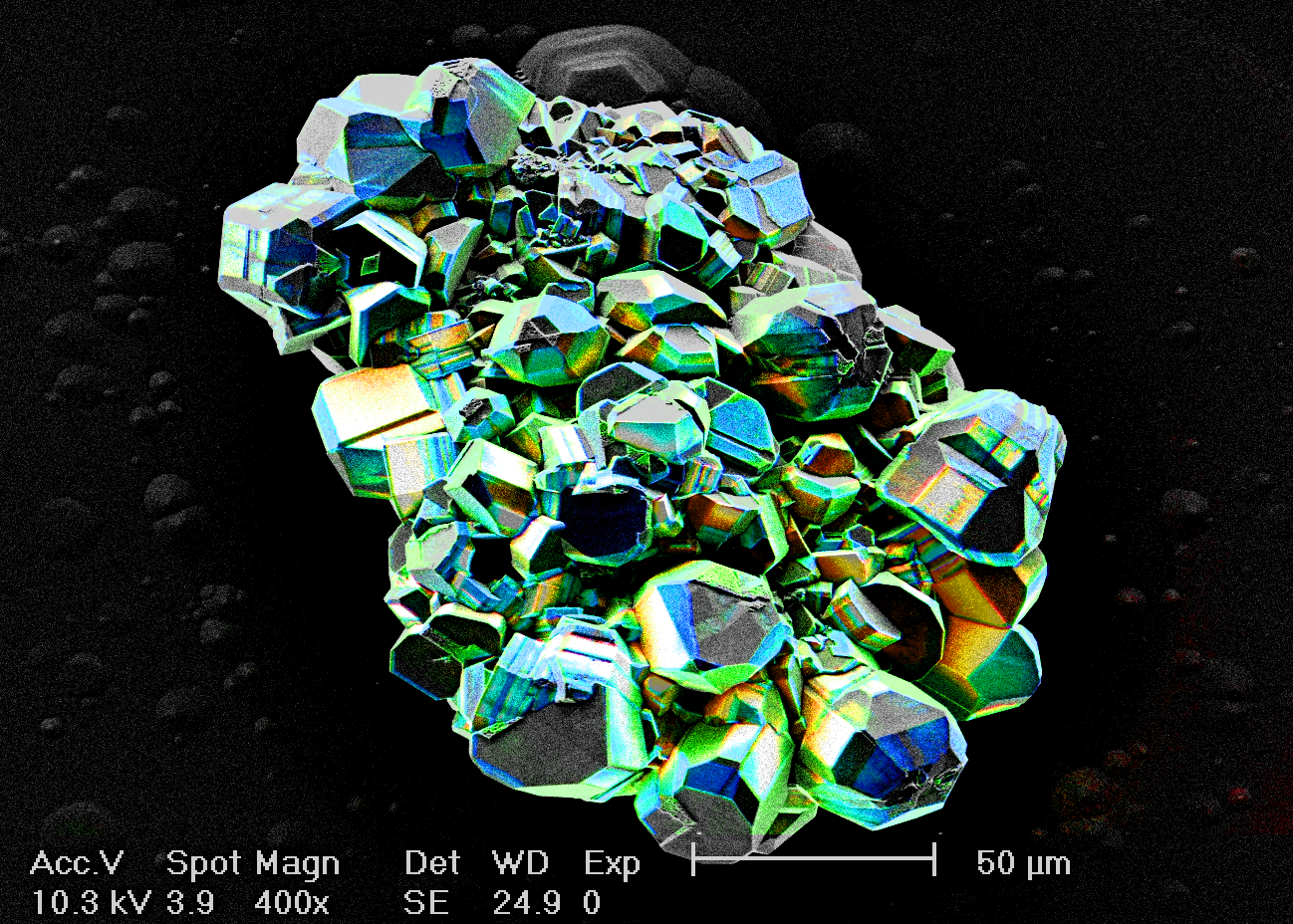
Color cathodoluminescence overlay on SEM image of an InGaN polycrystal. The blue and green channels represent real colors, the red channel corresponds to UV emission.

Cathodoluminescence can be used to detect impurities in minerals, or the presence of excess electron-hole pairs in semiconductors.. Cathodoluminescence, the emission of light when atoms excited by high-energy electrons return to their ground state, is analogous to UV-induced fluorescence, and some materials such as zinc sulfide and some fluorescent dyes, exhibit both phenomena. Over the last decades, cathodoluminescence was most commonly experienced as the light emission from the inner surface of the cathode-ray tube in television sets and computer CRT monitors. In the SEM, CL detectors either collect all light emitted by the specimen or can analyze the wavelengths emitted by the specimen and display an emission spectrum or an image of the distribution of cathodoluminescence emitted by the specimen in real color.

== X-ray microanalysis ==
Characteristic X-rays that are produced by the interaction of electrons with the sample may also be detected in an SEM equipped for energy-dispersive X-ray spectroscopy or wavelength dispersive X-ray spectroscopy. Analysis of the x-ray signals may be used to map the distribution and estimate the abundance of elements in the sample.

== Complementary techniques ==
Many SEM-based research studies are supported by complementary nanoscale techniques such as atomic force microscopy (AFM) and its electrical imaging modes. These methods provide insights that go beyond surface morphology. For example, AFM can probe the sample's surface topography at the nanometer scale using a sharp tip in contact or tapping mode. Conductive AFM (C-AFM) enables mapping of local electrical conductivity, useful in studying resistive switching materials and semiconductors. Kelvin probe force microscopy (KPFM) measures surface potential variations, which is valuable for analyzing charge distributions in electronic or photovoltaic materials. When used alongside SEM, these techniques offer a comprehensive understanding of both structural and functional properties of materials.

== Resolution of the SEM ==
A video illustrating a typical practical magnification range of a scanning electron microscope designed for biological specimens. The video starts at 25×, about 6 mm across the whole field of view, and zooms in to 12000×, about 12 μm across the whole field of view. The spherical objects are glass beads with a diameter of 10 μm, similar in diameter to a red blood cell.

A SEM is not a camera and the detector is not continuously image-forming like a CCD array or film. Unlike in an optical system, the resolution is not limited by the diffraction limit, fineness of lenses or mirrors or detector array resolution. The focusing optics can be large and coarse, and the SE detector is fist-sized and simply detects current. Instead, the spatial resolution of the SEM depends on the size of the electron spot, which in turn depends on both the wavelength of the electrons and the electron-optical system that produces the scanning beam. The resolution is also limited by the size of the interaction volume, the volume of specimen material that interacts with the electron beam. The spot size and the interaction volume are both large compared to the distances between atoms, so the resolution of the SEM is not high enough to image individual atoms, as is possible with a transmission electron microscope (TEM). The SEM has compensating advantages, though, including the ability to image a comparatively large area of the specimen; the ability to image bulk materials (not just thin films or foils); and the variety of analytical modes available for measuring the composition and properties of the specimen. Depending on the instrument, the resolution can fall somewhere between less than 1 nm and 20 nm. As of 2009, The world's highest resolution conventional (≤30 kV) SEM can reach a point resolution of 0.4 nm using a secondary electron detector.

== Environmental SEM ==
Conventional SEM requires samples to be imaged under vacuum, because a gas atmosphere rapidly spreads and attenuates electron beams. As a consequence, samples that produce a significant amount of vapour, e.g. wet biological samples or oil-bearing rock, must be either dried or cryogenically frozen. Processes involving phase transitions, such as the drying of adhesives or melting of alloys, liquid transport, chemical reactions, and solid-air-gas systems, in general cannot be observed with conventional high-vacuum SEM. In environmental SEM (ESEM), the chamber is evacuated of air, but water vapor is retained near its saturation pressure, and the residual pressure remains relatively high. This allows the analysis of samples containing water or other volatile substances. With ESEM, observations of living insects have been possible.

The first commercial development of the ESEM in the late 1980s allowed samples to be observed in low-pressure gaseous environments (e.g. 1–50 Torr or 0.1–6.7 kPa) and high relative humidity (up to 100%). This was made possible by the development of a secondary-electron detector capable of operating in the presence of water vapour and by the use of pressure-limiting apertures with differential pumping in the path of the electron beam to separate the vacuum region (around the gun and lenses) from the sample chamber. The first commercial ESEMs were produced by the ElectroScan Corporation in USA in 1988. ElectroScan was taken over by Philips (who later sold their electron-optics division to FEI Company) in 1996.

ESEM is especially useful for non-metallic and biological materials because coating with carbon or gold is unnecessary. Uncoated plastics and elastomers can be routinely examined, as can uncoated biological samples. This is useful because coating can be difficult to reverse, may conceal small features on the surface of the sample and may reduce the value of the results obtained. X-ray analysis is difficult with a coating of a heavy metal, so carbon coatings are routinely used in conventional SEMs, but ESEM makes it possible to perform X-ray microanalysis on uncoated non-conductive specimens; however some specific for ESEM artifacts are introduced in X-ray analysis. ESEM may be the preferred for electron microscopy of unique samples from criminal or civil actions, where forensic analysis may need to be repeated by several different experts. It is possible to study specimens in liquid with ESEM or with other liquid-phase electron microscopy methods.

== Transmission SEM and Energy Loss Spectroscopy ==
The SEM can also be used in transmission mode by incorporating an appropriate detector below a thin specimen section. Detectors are available for bright field, dark field, as well as segmented detectors for mid-field to high angle annular dark-field. Despite the difference in instrumentation, this technique is still commonly referred to as scanning transmission electron microscopy (STEM).

Since 2016, there has been growing interest in the use of transmission-mode SEM for Electron Energy Loss Spectroscopy (EELS). Pioneered by Hitachi and the Gauvin group at McGill University, SEM-EELS elemental mapping of thin specimens is now possible, along with reduced beam damage in lithiated materials due to the lower beam energy reducing knock-on damage. In 2025, scientists from MIT demonstrated that EELS analysis of thin specimens is possible in any retrofitted SEM in the 1-20 keV energy range.

== SEM in forensic science ==
The SEM is used often in Forensic Science for magnified analysis of microscopic things such as diatoms and gunshot residue. Because SEM is a nondestructive force on the sample, it can be used to analyze evidence without damaging it. The SEM shoots a beam of high energy electrons to the sample which bounce off of the sample without changing or destroying it. This is great when it comes to analyzing diatoms. When a person dies by drowning, they inhale the water which causes what is in the water (diatoms) to get in the blood stream, brain, kidneys, and more. These diatoms in the body can be magnified with the SEM to determine the type of diatoms which aid in understanding how and where the person died. By using the images produced by the SEM, forensic scientists can compare diatoms types to confirm the body of water a person died in.

Gunshot residue (GSR) analysis can be done with many different analytical instruments, but SEM is a common way to analyze inorganic compounds because of the way it can closely analyze the types of elements (mostly metals) through its three detectors: backscatter electron detector, secondary electron detector, and X-ray detector. GSR can be collected from the crime scene, victim, or shooter and analyzed with the SEM. This can help scientists determine proximity and or contact with the discharged firearm.

== Color in SEM ==
Electron microscopes do not naturally produce color images. A secondary electron detector produces a single value per pixel that corresponds to the number of electrons received by the detector during the short period of time when the beam is targeted to the (x, y) pixel position. For each pixel, this single value is represented by a grey level, forming a monochrome image. However, several methods can used to get color electron microscopy images.

=== False color using a single detector ===
- On compositional images of flat surfaces (typically BSE):

The easiest way to get color is to replace each grey level with an arbitrary color, using a color look-up table. This method is known as false color imaging and can help to distinguish phases of the sample with similar properties or composition.

- On textured-surface images:

As an alternative to simply replacing each grey level by a color, a sample observed by an oblique beam allows researchers to create an approximative topography image (see further section "Photometric 3D rendering from a single SEM image"). Such topography can then be processed by 3D-rendering algorithms for a more natural rendering of the surface texture.

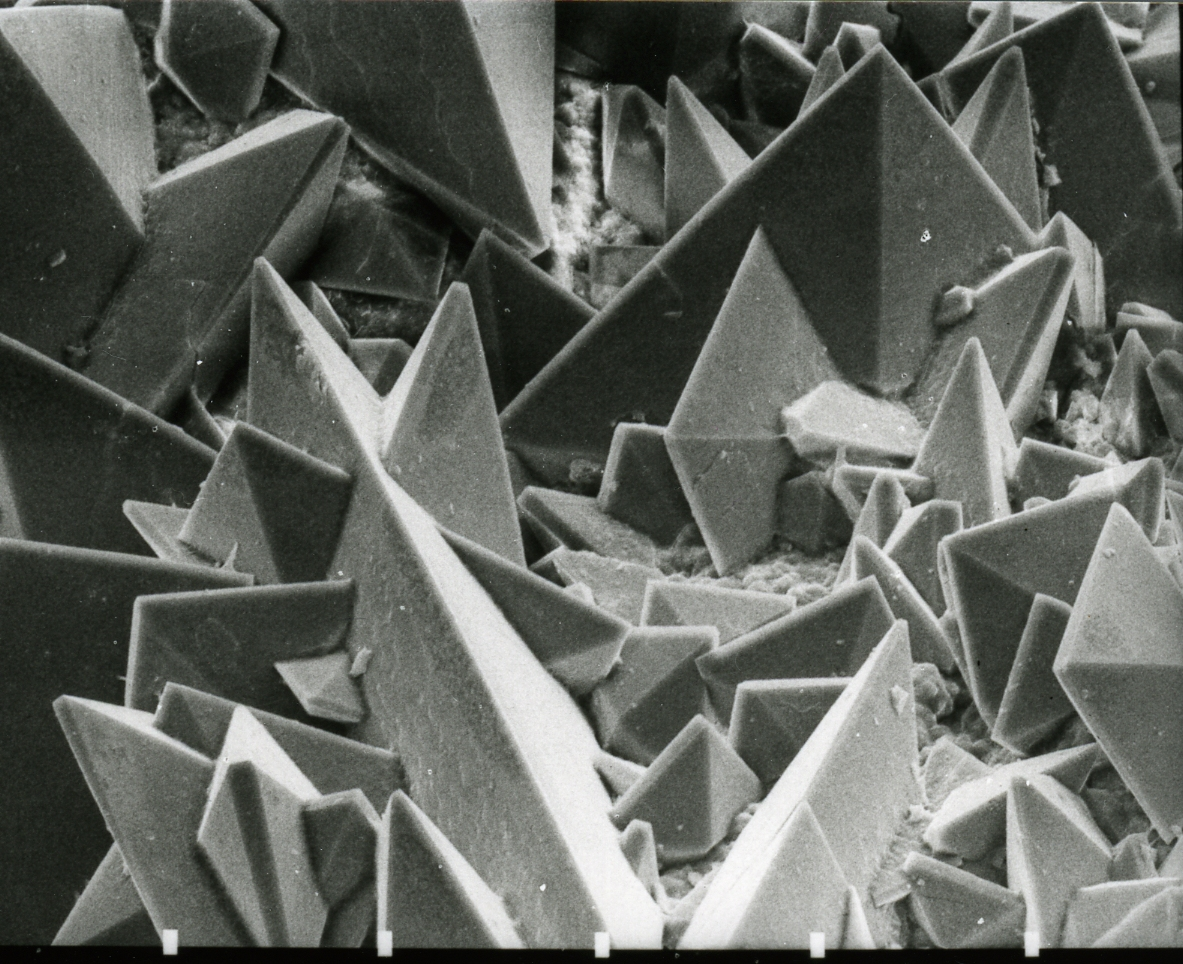
Surface of a kidney stone

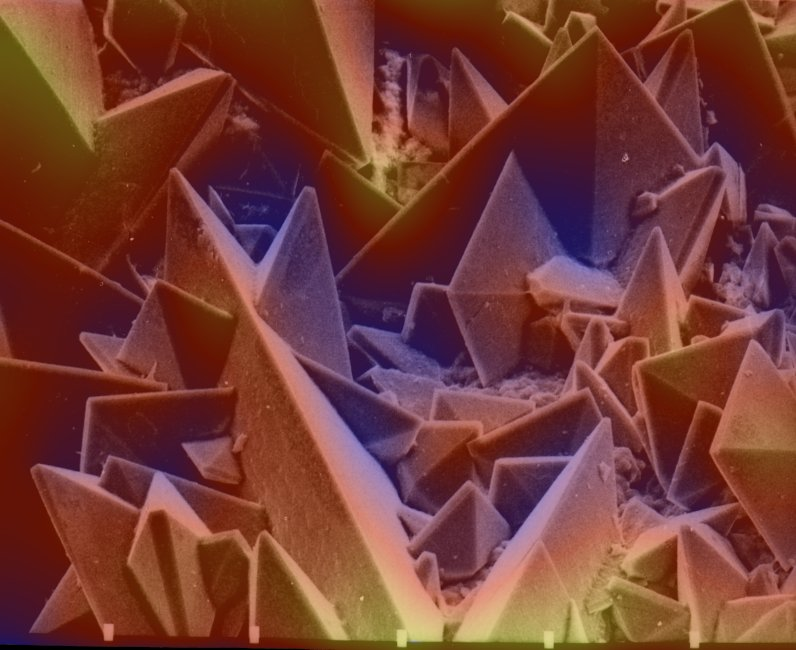
The same after re-processing of the color from the estimated topography

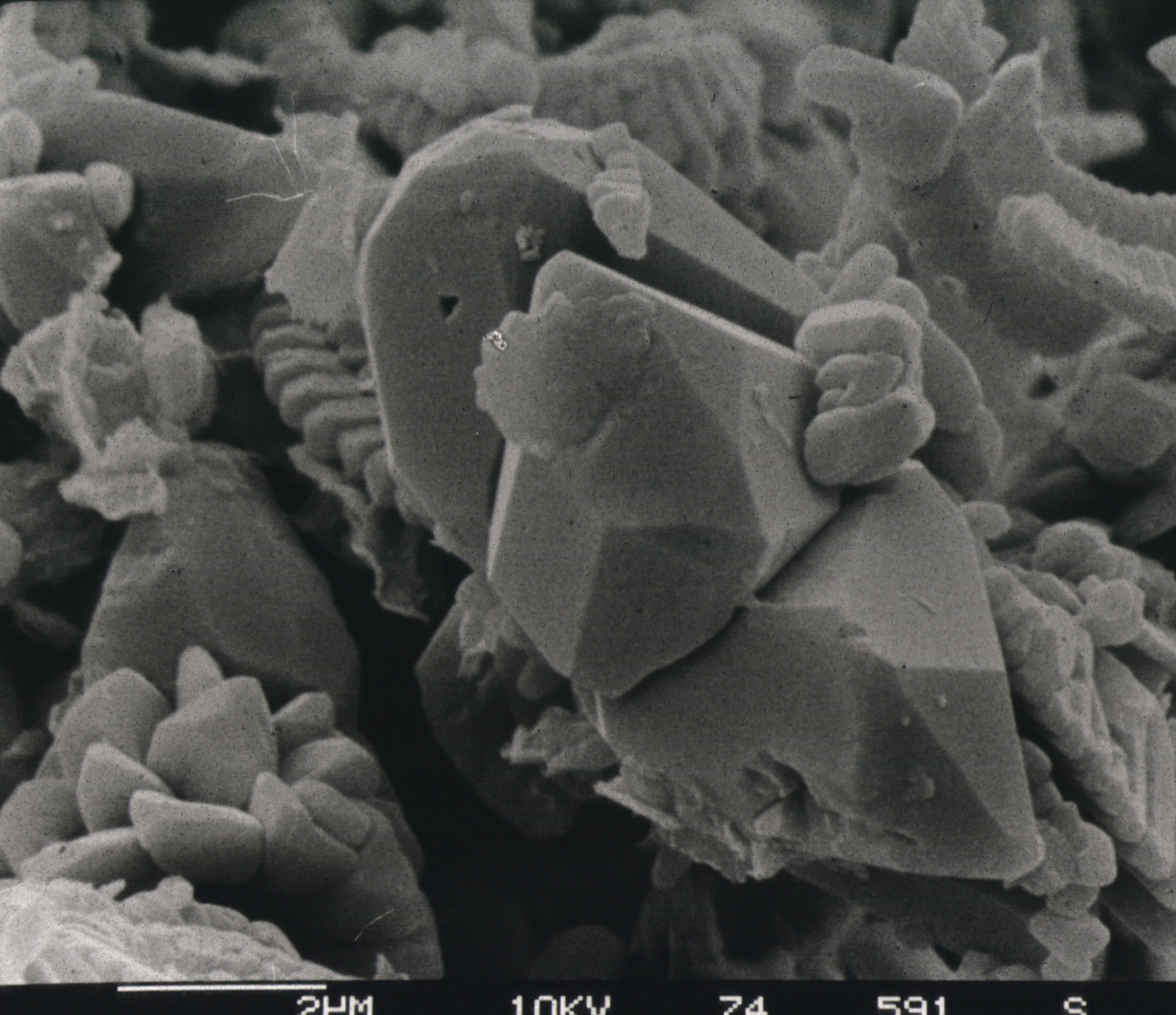
SEM image of a diagenetically altered discoaster

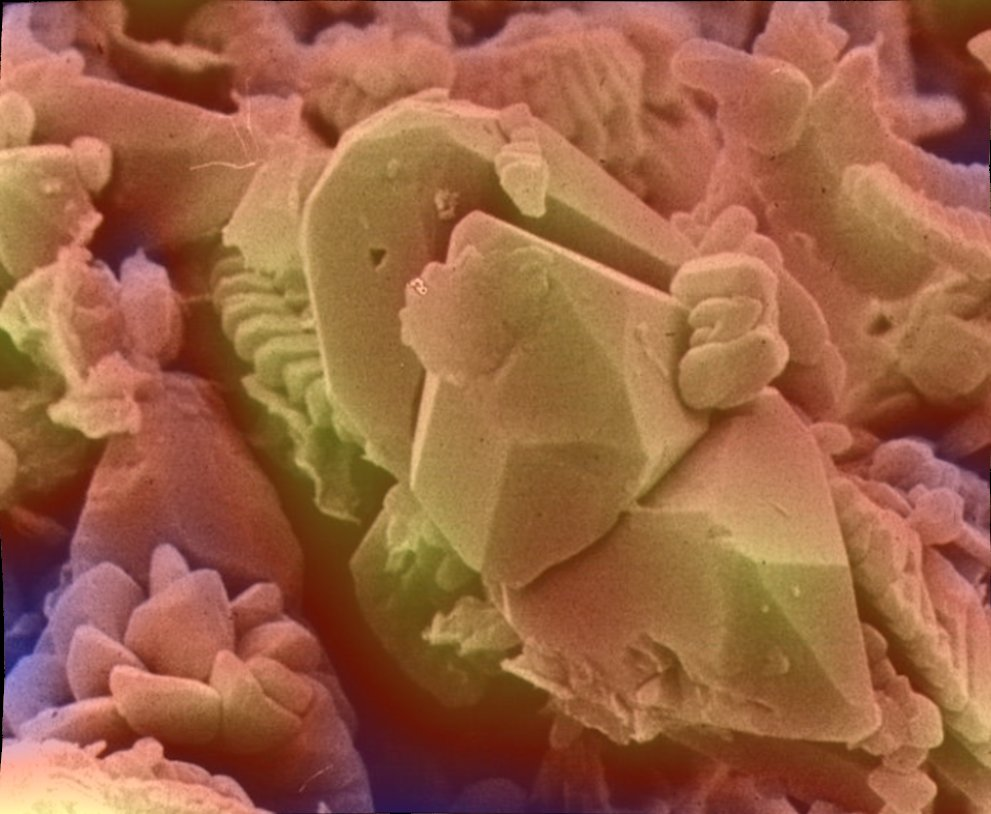
The same image after similar colorization

=== SEM image coloring ===
Very often, published SEM images are artificially colored. This may be done for aesthetic effect, to clarify structure or to add a realistic appearance to the sample and generally does not add information about the specimen.

Coloring may be performed manually with photo-editing software, or semi-automatically with dedicated software using feature-detection or object-oriented segmentation.

Alternately, when additional information from other detectors like EDX, EBSD, ECCI or cathodoluminescence is available, it can be merged as color channel(s) to provide rich material information in a single, high-resolution image.

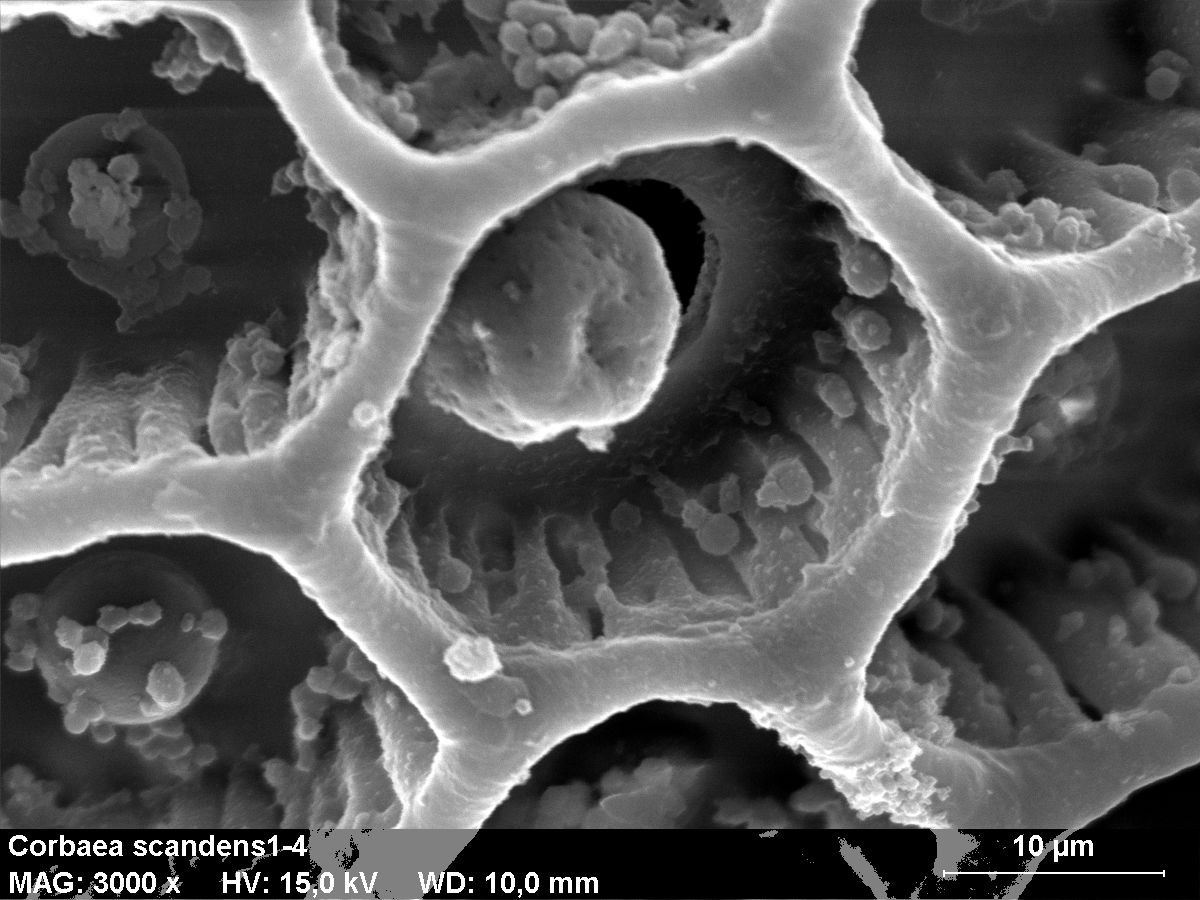
SEM image of Cobaea scandens pollen

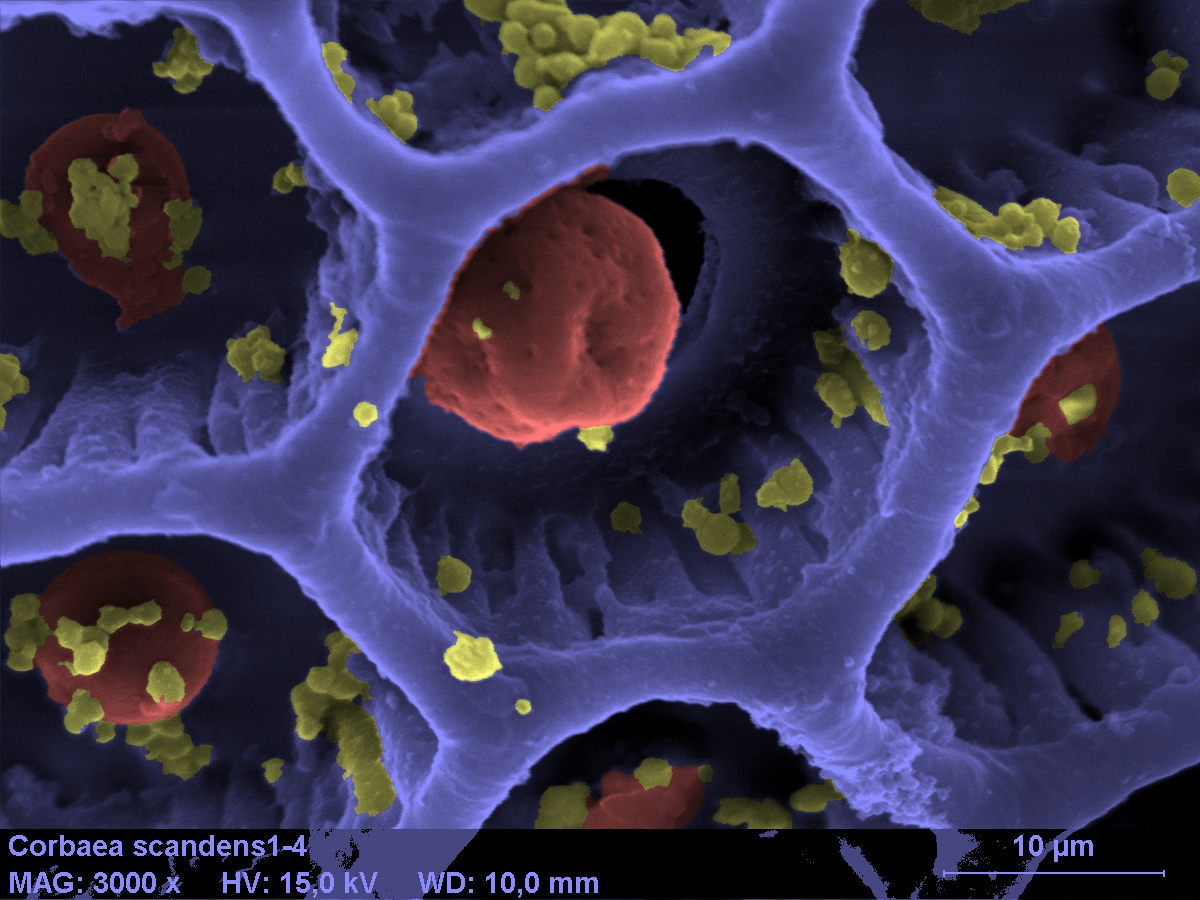
The same after semi-automatic coloring. Arbitrary colors help identifying the various elements of the structure.

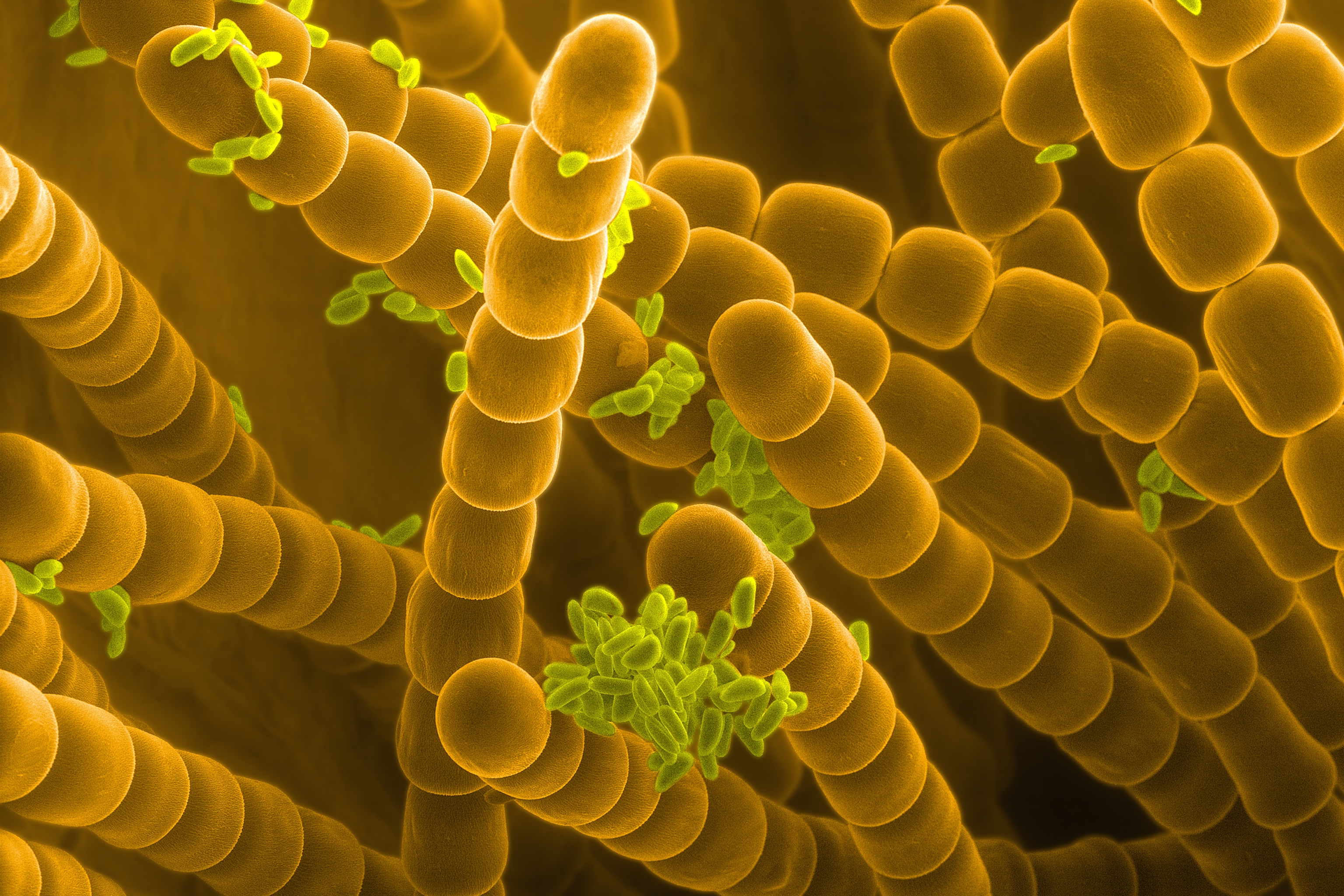
Colored SEM image of Tradescantia pollen and stamens

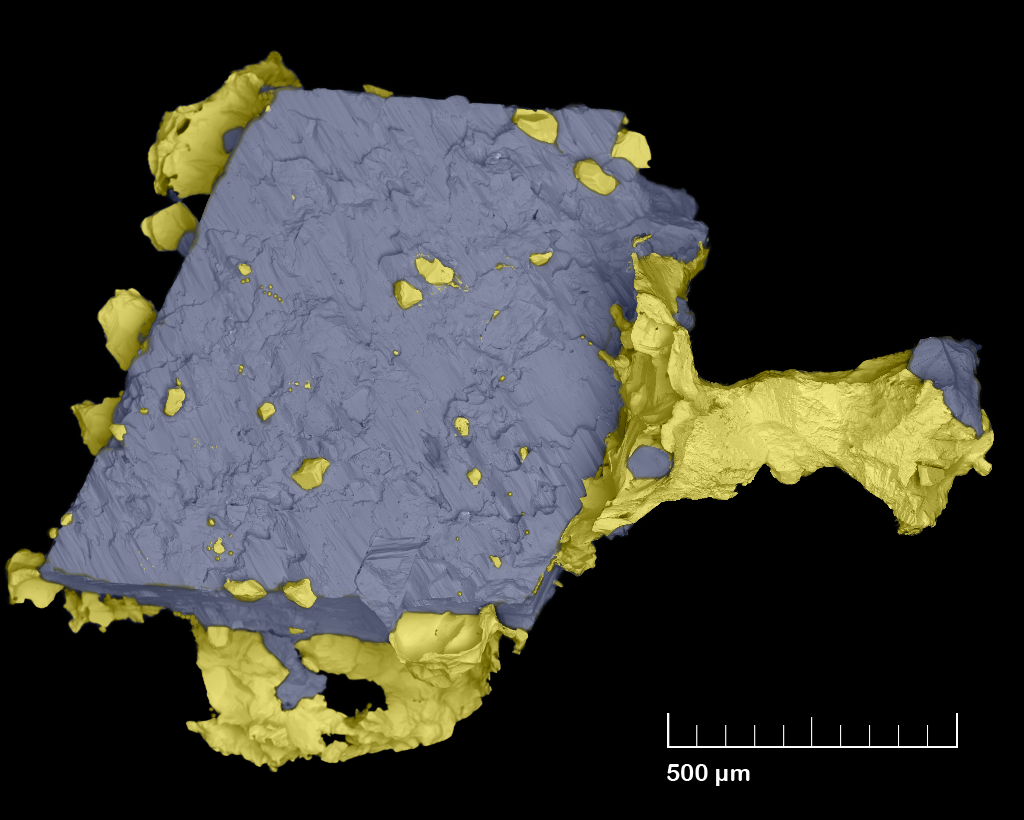
Colored SEM image of native gold and arsenopyrite crystal intergrowth

=== Color built using multiple electron detectors ===
In some configurations more information is gathered per pixel, often by the use of multiple detectors.

As a common example, secondary electron and backscattered electron detectors are superimposed and a color is assigned to each of the images captured by each detector, with a result of a combined color image where colors are related to the density of the components. This method is known as density-dependent color SEM (DDC-SEM). Micrographs produced by DDC-SEM retain topographical information, which is better captured by the secondary electrons detector and combine it to the information about density, obtained by the backscattered electron detector.

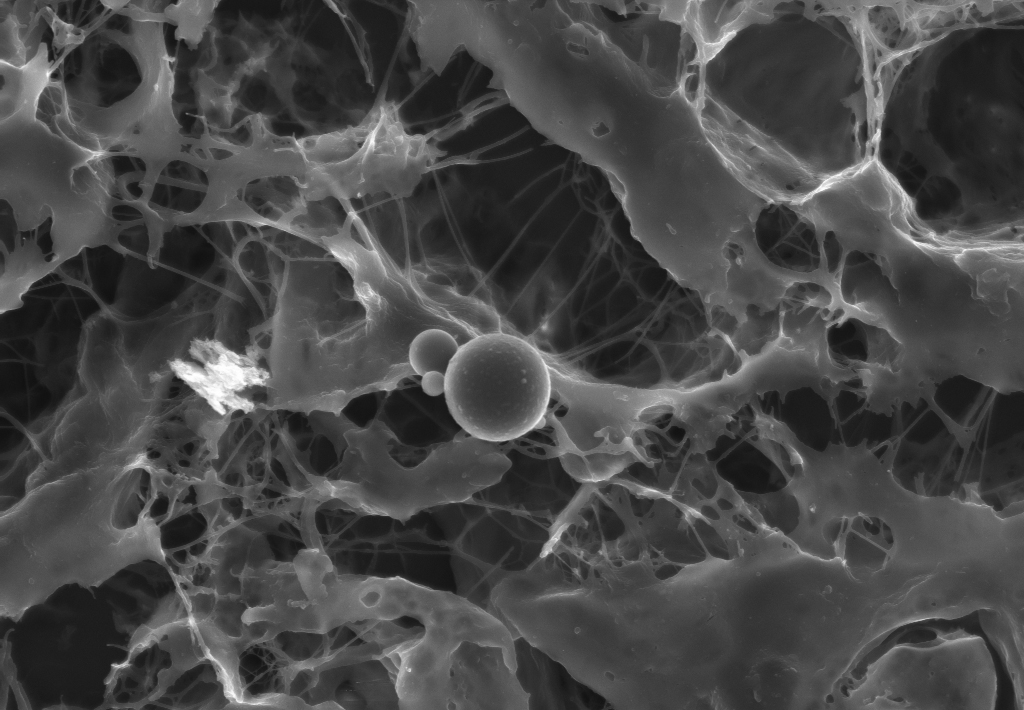
DDC-SEM of calcified particle in cardiac tissue - Signal 1: SE

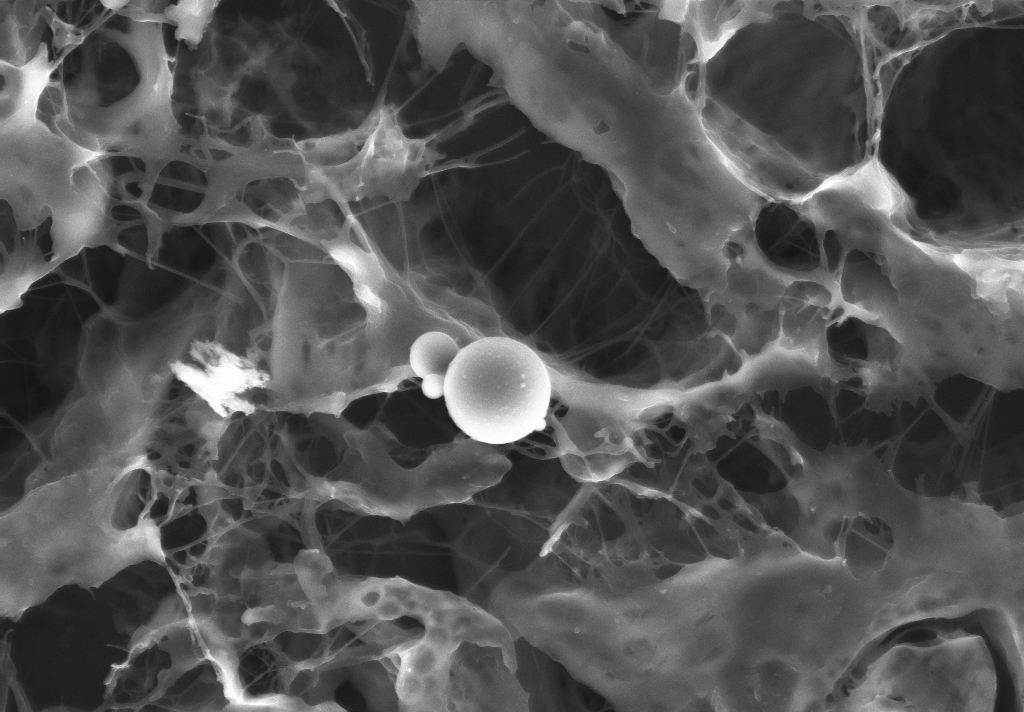
Signal 2: BSE

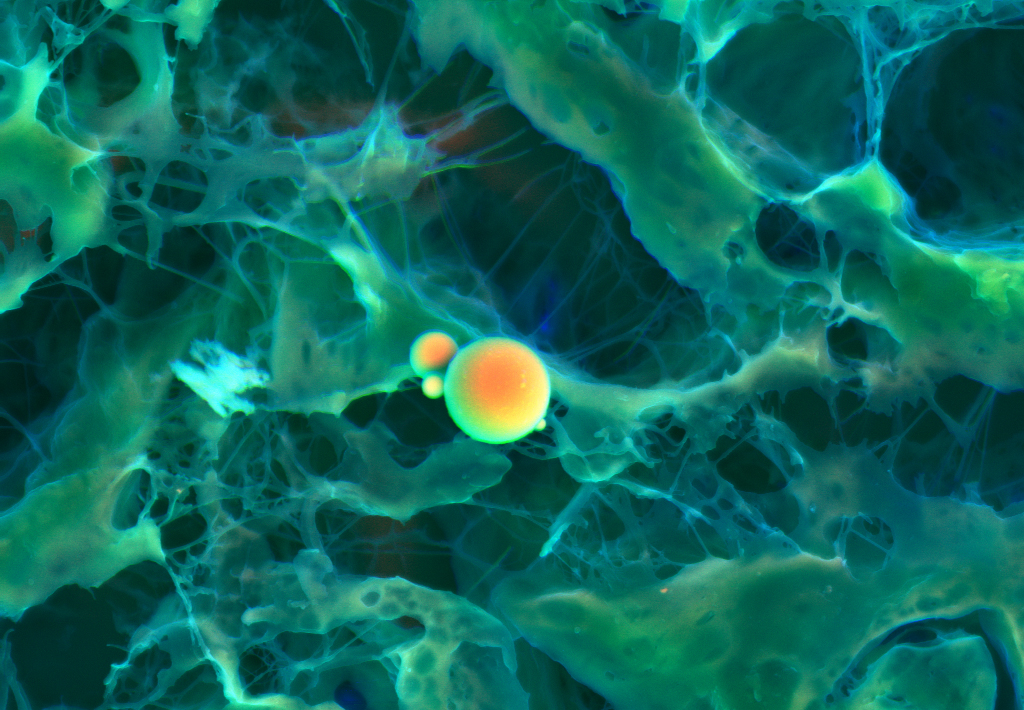
Colorized image obtained from the two previous. Density-dependent color scanning electron micrograph SEM (DDC-SEM) of cardiovascular calcification, showing in orange a calcium phosphate spherical particle (denser material) and, in green, the extracellular matrix (less dense material)

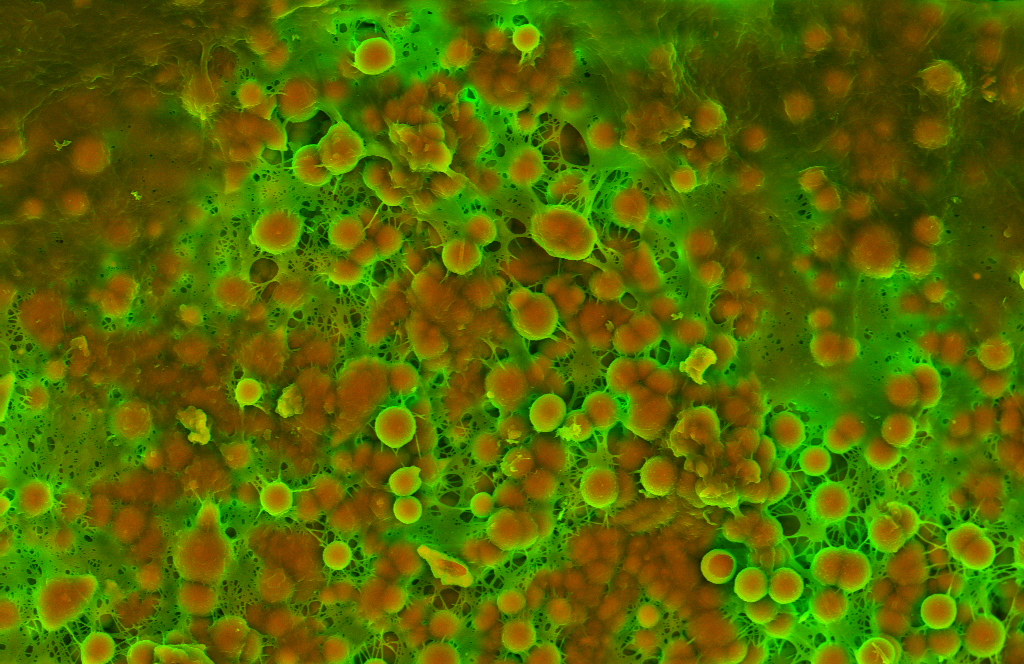
Same work with a larger view, part of a study on human cardiovascular tissue calcification

=== Analytical signals based on generated photons ===
Measurement of the energy of photons emitted from the specimen is a common method to get analytical capabilities. Examples are the energy-dispersive X-ray spectroscopy (EDS) detectors used in elemental analysis and cathodoluminescence microscope (CL) systems that analyze the intensity and spectrum of electron-induced luminescence in (for example) geological specimens. In SEM systems using these detectors it is common to color code these extra signals and superimpose them in a single color image, so that differences in the distribution of the various components of the specimen can be seen clearly and compared. Optionally, the standard secondary electron image can be merged with the one or more compositional channels, so that the specimen's structure and composition can be compared. Such images can be made while maintaining the full integrity of the original signal data, which is not modified in any way.

== Time resolution in SEM ==
There are various options for performing time-resolved measurements with an SEM. For slower time scales, it can be sufficient to scan over a sample multiple times and deduce the dynamics from this serie of images. If higher time resolution is required, a fast detector can be used. In the following example, five modes of an AFM cantilever were excited at frequencies of 32.2 kHz, 196 kHz, 522 kHz, 49 kHz and 231 kHz, and a fast detector (a Microchannel plate detector) recorded the time at which a secondary electron was detected relative to the excitation. The data was then sorted to create 100 frames for each of the shown modes..

For even faster phenomena on the picosecond timescale, pulsed electron sources are used and dynamics can be observed in a pump-probe scheme. The electron pulses can either be created with beam blankers or a laser driven photocathode.

== 3D in SEM ==
Unlike SPMs, SEMs do not naturally produce 3D images. However 3D data can be obtained using an SEM by methods such as Stereoscopy.

=== 3D SEM reconstruction from a stereo pair ===
- photogrammetry is the most metrologically accurate method to bring the third dimension to SEM images. Contrary to photometric methods (next paragraph), photogrammetry calculates absolute heights using triangulation methods. The drawbacks are that it works only if there is a minimum texture, and it requires two images to be acquired from two different angles, which implies the use of a tilt stage. (Photogrammetry is a software operation that calculates the shift (or "disparity") for each pixel, between the left image and the right image of the same pair. Such disparity reflects the local height).
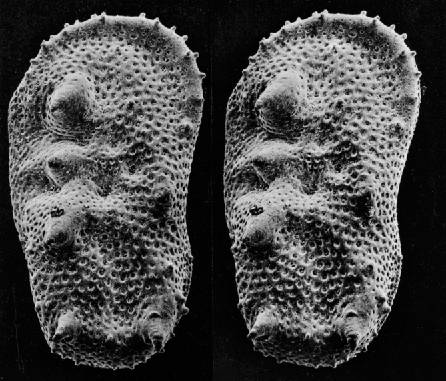
An SEM stereo pair of microfossils of less than 1 mm in size (Ostracoda) produced by tilting along the longitudinal axis

From this pair of SEM images, the third dimension has been reconstructed by photogrammetry (using MountainsSEM software, see next image); then a series of 3D representations with different angles have been made and assembled into a GIF file to produce this animation.

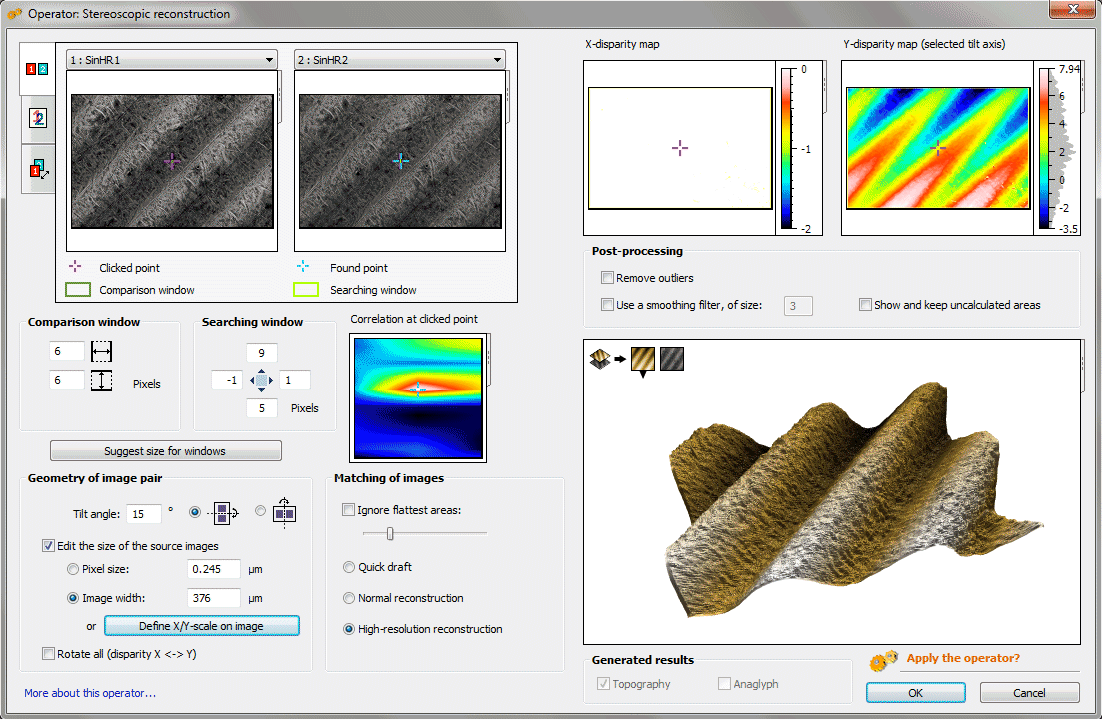
3D surface reconstruction of a (Ra = 3 μm) roughness calibration sample (as used to calibrate profilometers), from 2 scanning electron microscope images tilted by 15° (top left). The calculation of the 3D model (bottom right) takes about 1.5 second and the error on the Ra roughness value calculated is less than 0.5%.

=== Photometric 3D SEM reconstruction from a four-quadrant detector by "shape from shading" ===
This method typically uses a four-quadrant BSE detector (alternatively for one manufacturer, a 3-segment detector). The microscope produces four images of the same specimen at the same time, so no tilt of the sample is required. The method gives metrological 3D dimensions as far as the slope of the specimen remains reasonable. Most SEM manufacturers now (2018) offer such a built-in or optional four-quadrant BSE detector, together with proprietary software to calculate a 3D image in real time.

Other approaches use more sophisticated (and sometimes GPU-intensive) methods like the optimal estimation algorithm and offer much better results at the cost of high demands on computing power.

In all instances, this approach works by integration of the slope, so vertical slopes and overhangs are ignored; for instance, if an entire sphere lies on a flat, little more than the upper hemisphere is seen emerging above the flat, resulting in wrong altitude of the sphere apex. The prominence of this effect depends on the angle of the BSE detectors with respect to the sample, but these detectors are usually situated around (and close to) the electron beam, so this effect is very common.

=== Photometric 3D rendering from a single SEM image ===
This method requires an SEM image obtained in oblique low angle lighting. The grey-level is then interpreted as the slope, and the slope integrated to restore the specimen topography. This method is interesting for visual enhancement and the detection of the shape and position of objects; however the vertical heights cannot usually be calibrated, contrary to other methods such as photogrammetry.

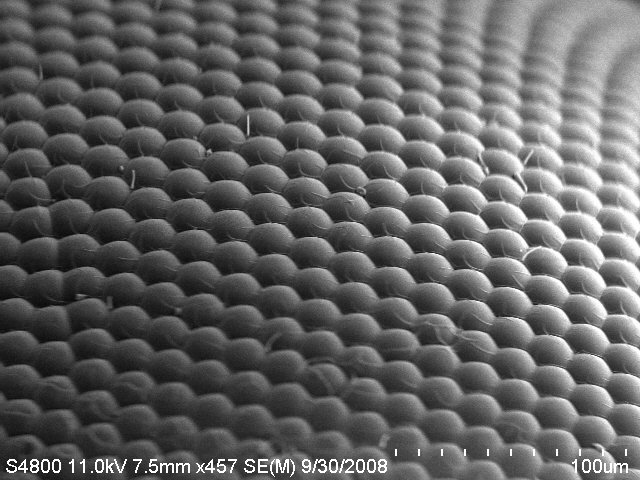
SEM image of a house fly compound eye surface at 450× magnification

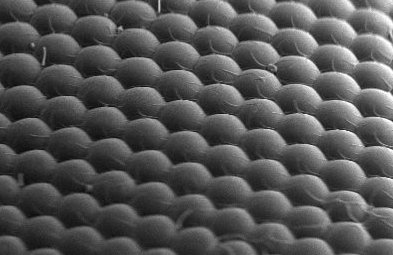
Detail of the previous image

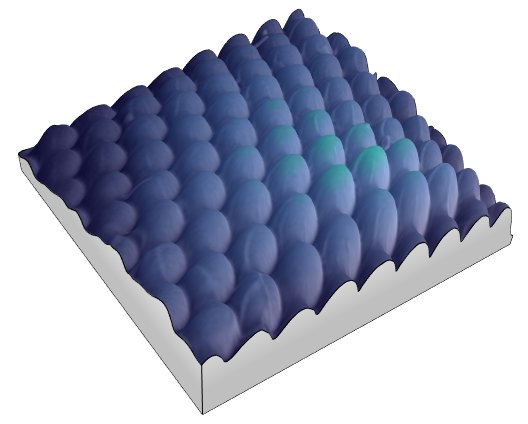
SEM 3D reconstruction from the previous using shape from shading algorithms

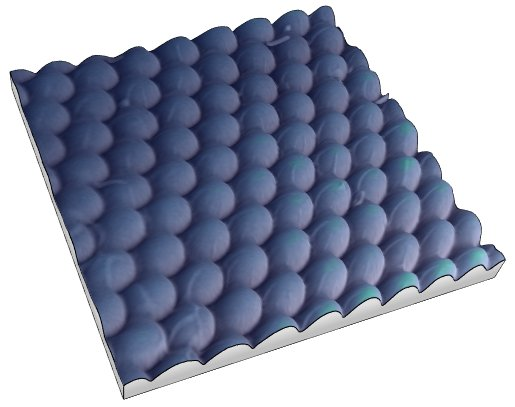
Same as the previous, but with lighting homogenized before applying the shape from shading algorithms

=== Other types of 3D SEM reconstruction ===
- Inverse reconstruction using electron-material interactive models
- Multi-Resolution reconstruction using single 2D File: High-quality 3D imaging may be an ultimate solution for revealing the complexities of any porous media, but acquiring them is costly and time-consuming. High-quality 2D SEM images, on the other hand, are widely available. Recently, a novel three-step, multiscale, multiresolution reconstruction method is presented that directly uses 2D images in order to develop 3D models. This method, based on a Shannon Entropy and conditional simulation, can be used for most of the available stationary materials and can build various stochastic 3D models just using a few thin sections.
- Ion-abrasion SEM (IA-SEM) is a method of nanoscale 3D imaging that uses a focused beam of gallium to repeatedly abrade the specimen surface 20 nanometres at a time. Each exposed surface is then scanned to compile a 3D image.

=== Applications of 3D SEM ===
One possible application is measuring the roughness of ice crystals. This method can combine variable-pressure environmental SEM and the 3D capabilities of the SEM to measure roughness on individual ice crystal facets, convert it into a computer model and run further statistical analysis on the model. Other measurements include fractal dimension, examining fracture surface of metals, characterization of materials, corrosion measurement, and dimensional measurements at the nano scale (step height, volume, angle, flatness, bearing ratio, coplanarity, etc.).

SEM is also used by art conservationists to discern threats to paintings' surface stability due to aging, such as the formations of complexes of zinc ions with fatty acids. Forensic scientists use SEM to detect art forgeries.

== Gallery of SEM images ==
The following are examples of images taken using an SEM.

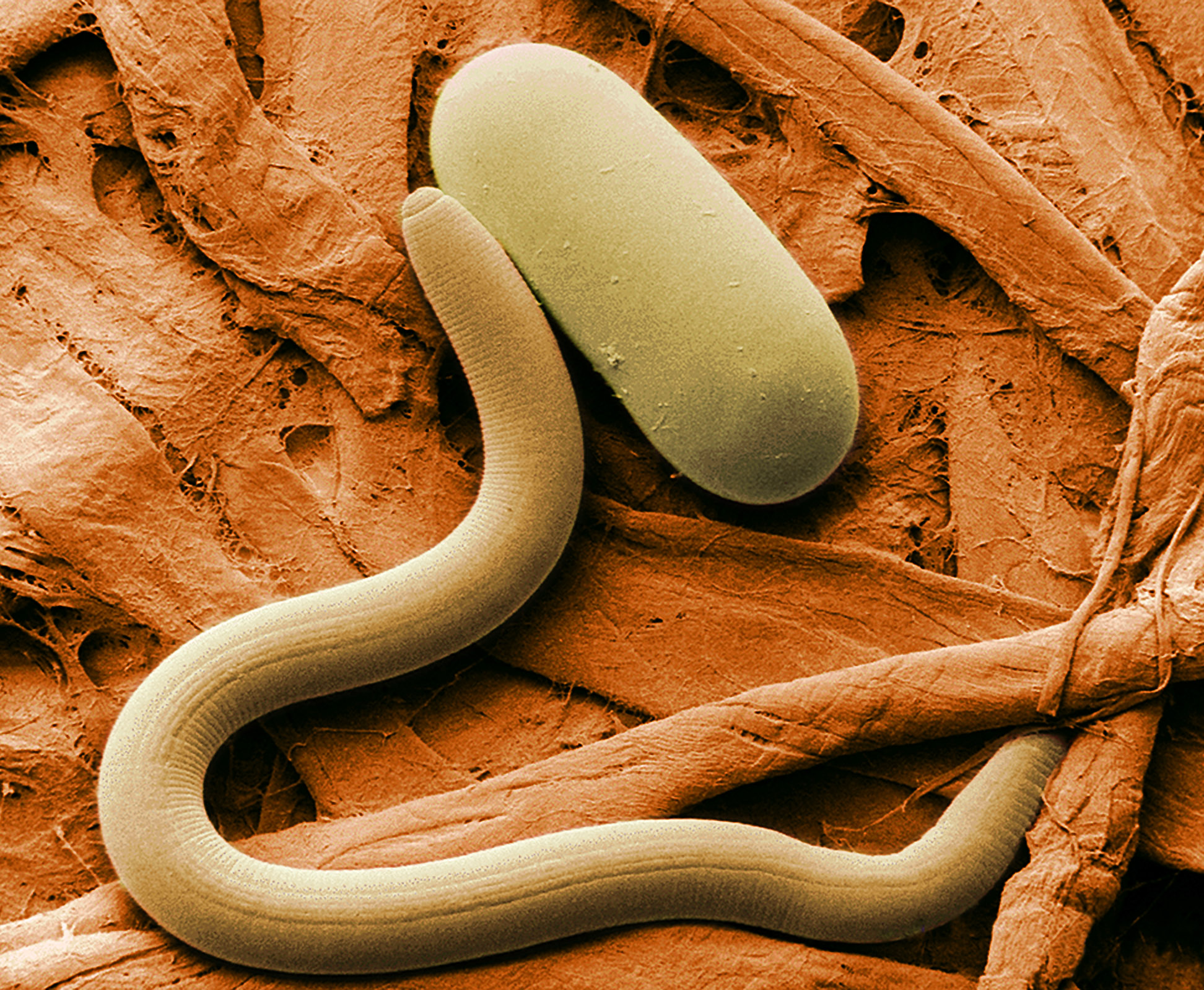
Colored SEM image of soybean cyst nematode and egg. The artificial coloring makes the image easier for non-specialists to view and understand the structures and surfaces revealed in micrographs.

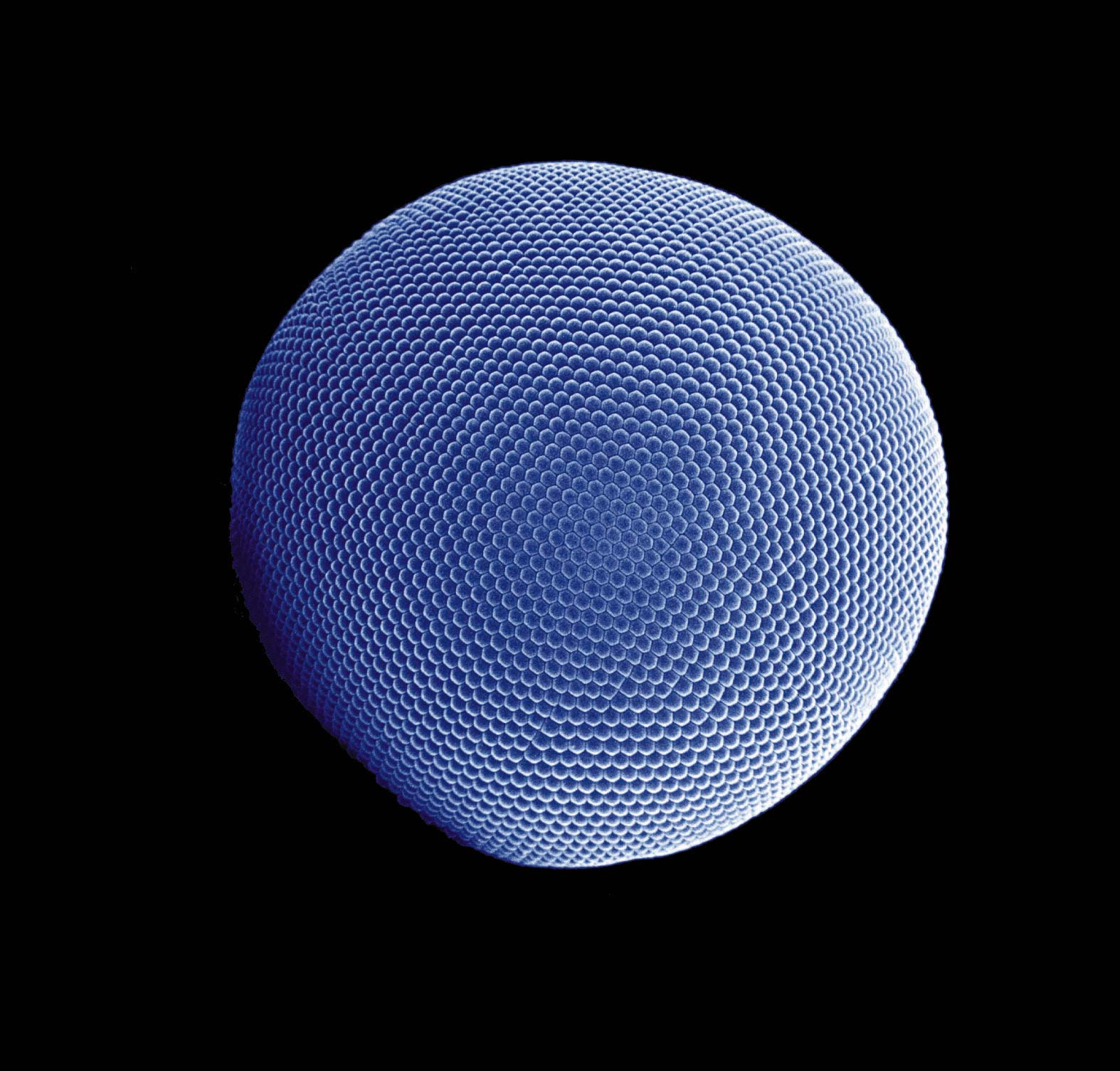
Compound eye of Antarctic krill Euphausia superba. Arthropod eyes are a common subject in SEM micrographs due to the depth of focus that an SEM image can capture. Colored picture.

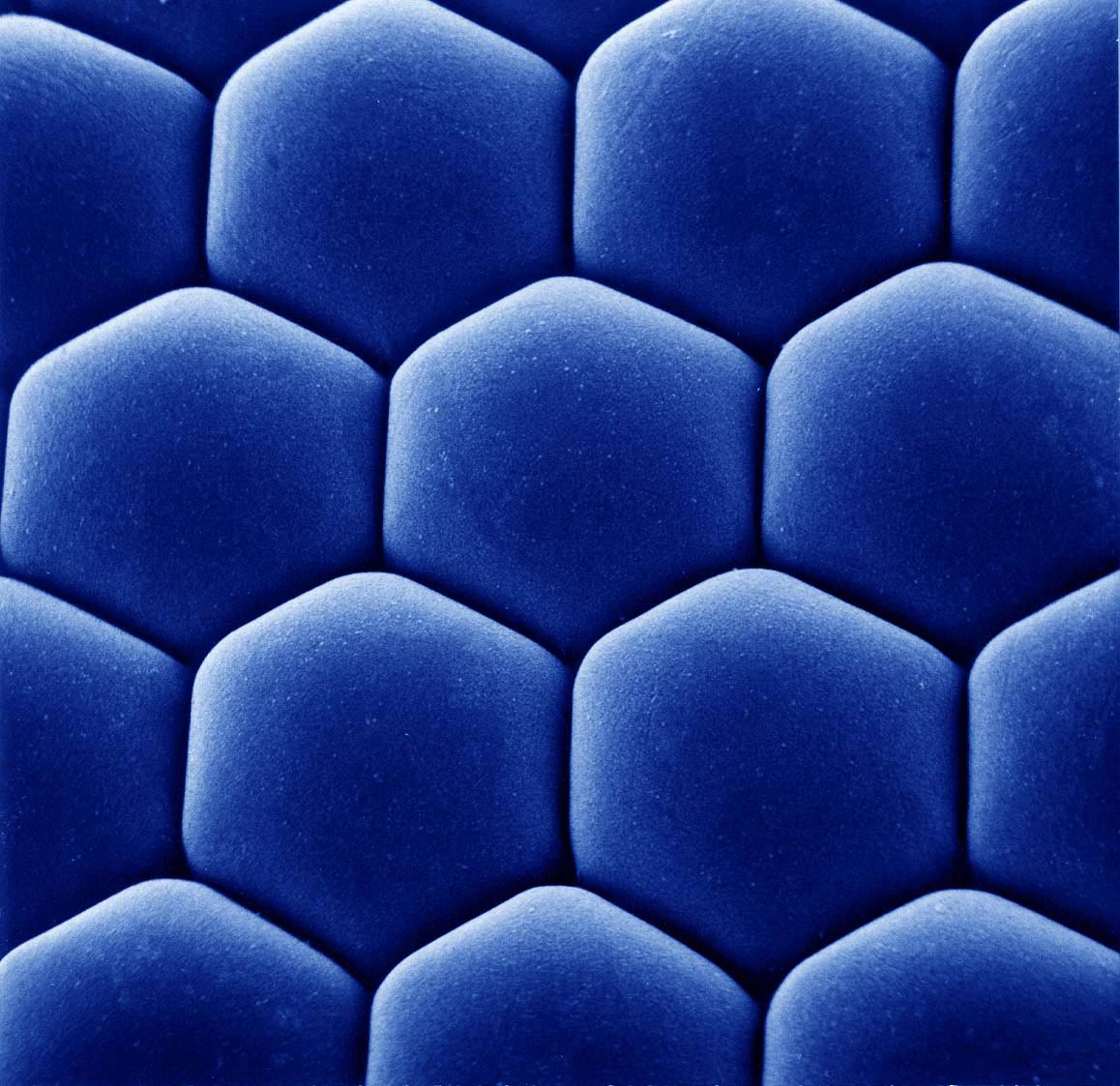
Ommatidia of Antarctic krill eye, a higher magnification of the krill's eye. SEMs cover a range from light microscopy up to the magnifications available with a TEM. Colored picture.

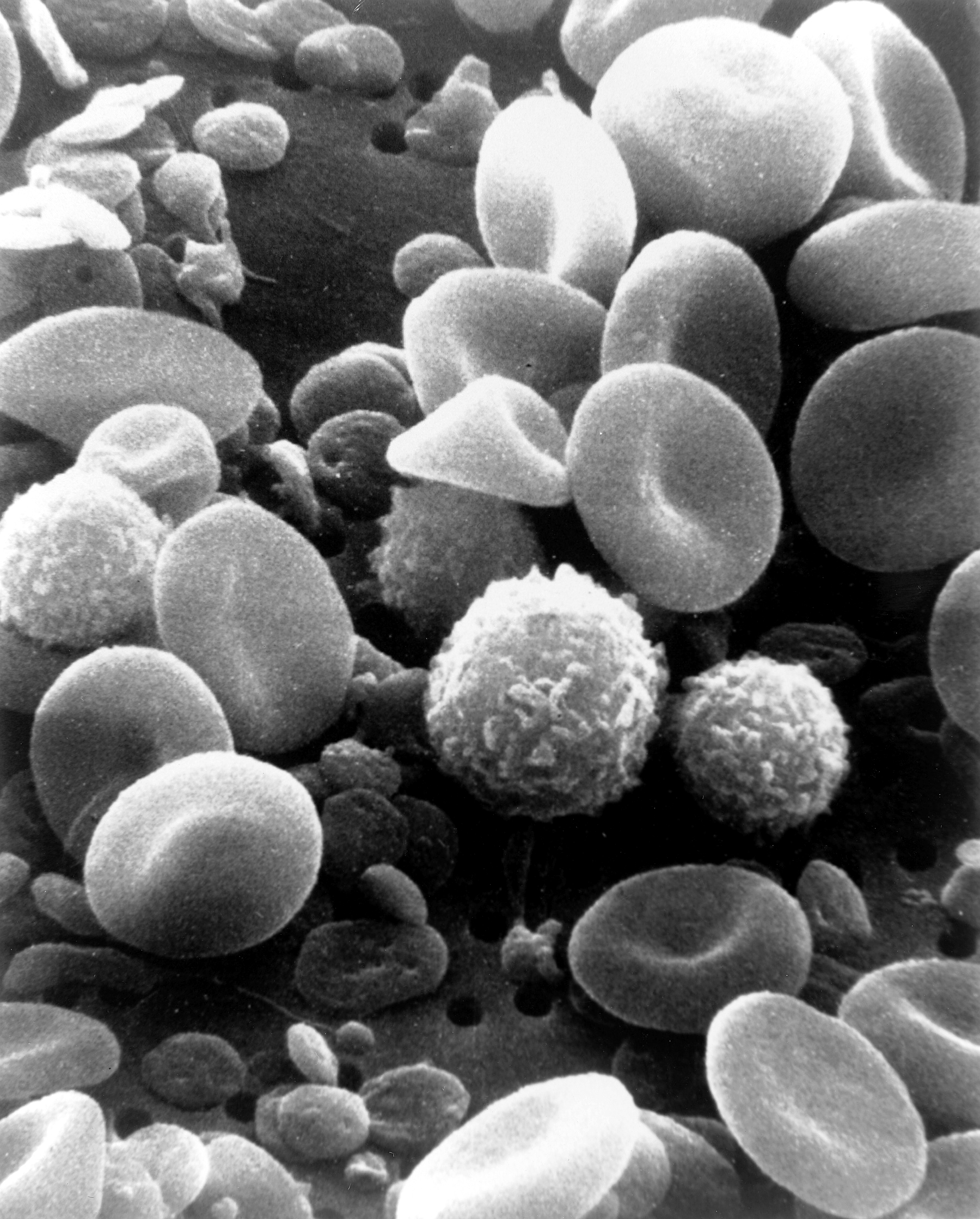
SEM image of normal circulating human blood. This is an older and noisy micrograph of a common subject for SEM micrographs: red blood cells.

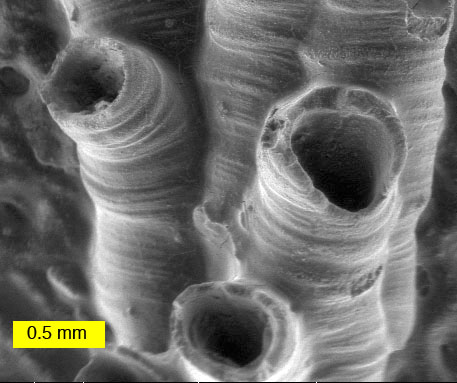
SEM image of a hederelloid from the Devonian of Michigan (largest tube diameter is 0.75 mm). The SEM is used extensively for capturing detailed images of micro and macro fossils.

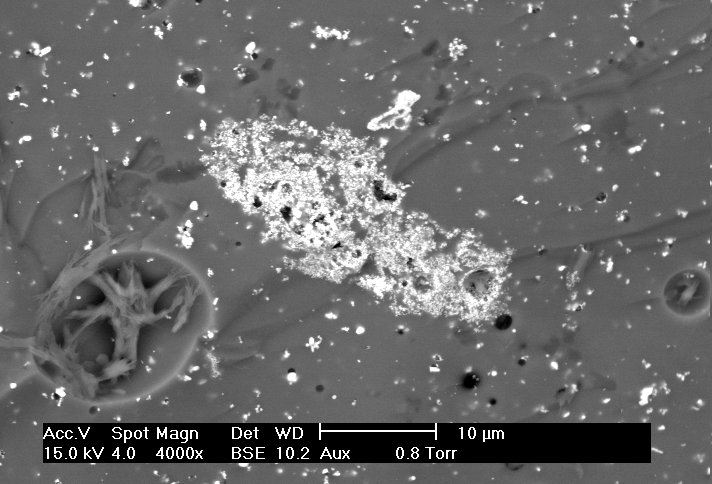
Backscattered electron (BSE) image of an antimony-rich region in a fragment of ancient glass. Museums use SEMs for studying valuable artifacts in a nondestructive manner.

SEM image of the corrosion layer on the surface of an ancient glass fragment; note the laminar structure of the corrosion layer.

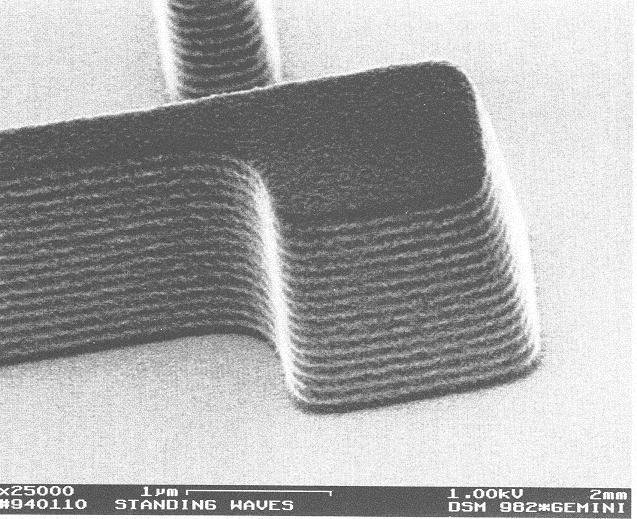
SEM image of a photoresist layer used in semiconductor manufacturing taken on a field emission SEM. These SEMs are important in the semiconductor industry for their high-resolution capabilities.

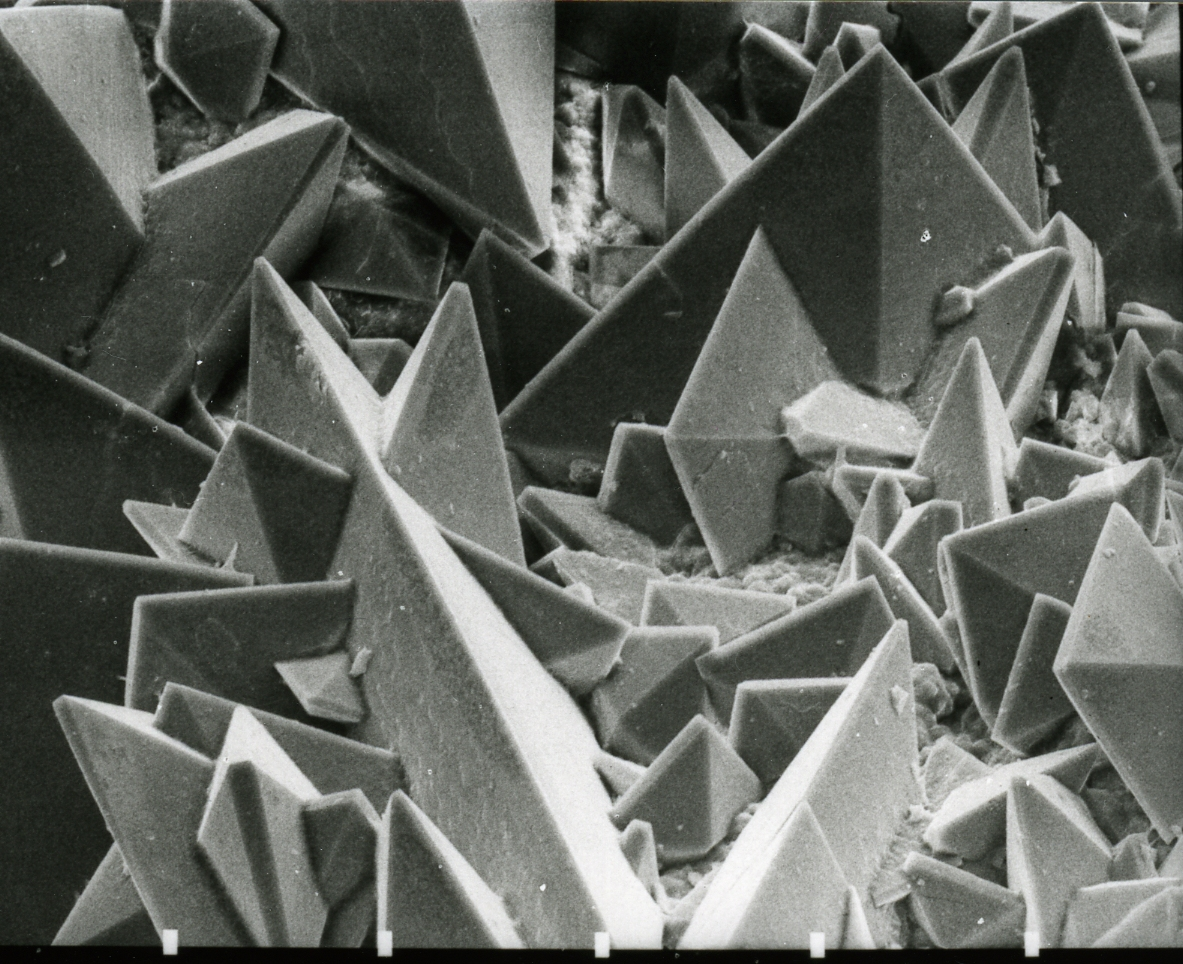
SEM image of the surface of a kidney stone showing tetragonal crystals of Weddellite (calcium oxalate dihydrate) emerging from the amorphous central part of the stone. Horizontal length of the picture represents 0.5 mm of the figured original.

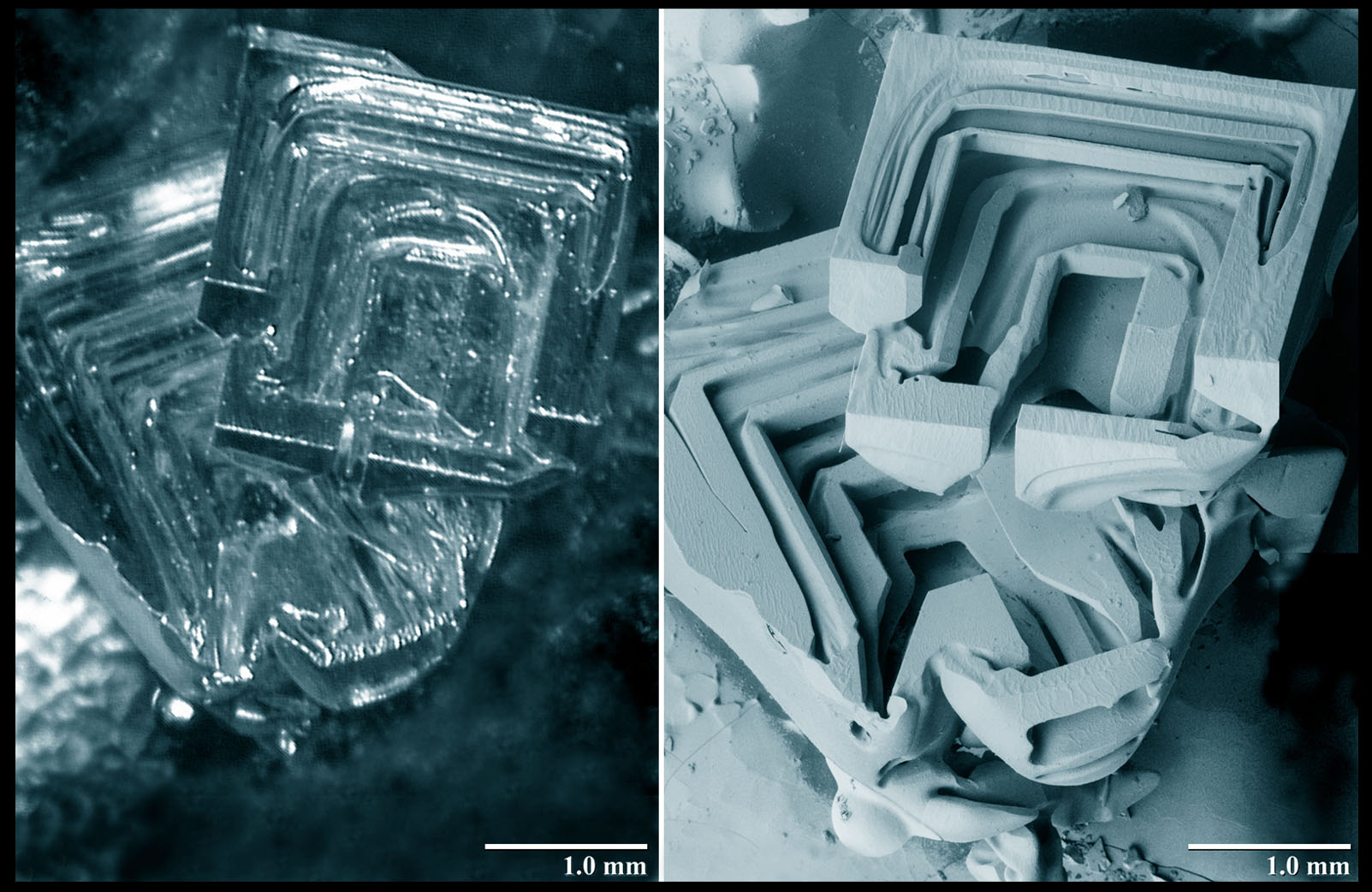
Two images of the same depth hoar snow crystal, viewed through a light microscope (left) and as an SEM image (right). Note how the SEM image allows for clear perception of the fine structure details which are hard to fully make out in the light microscope image.

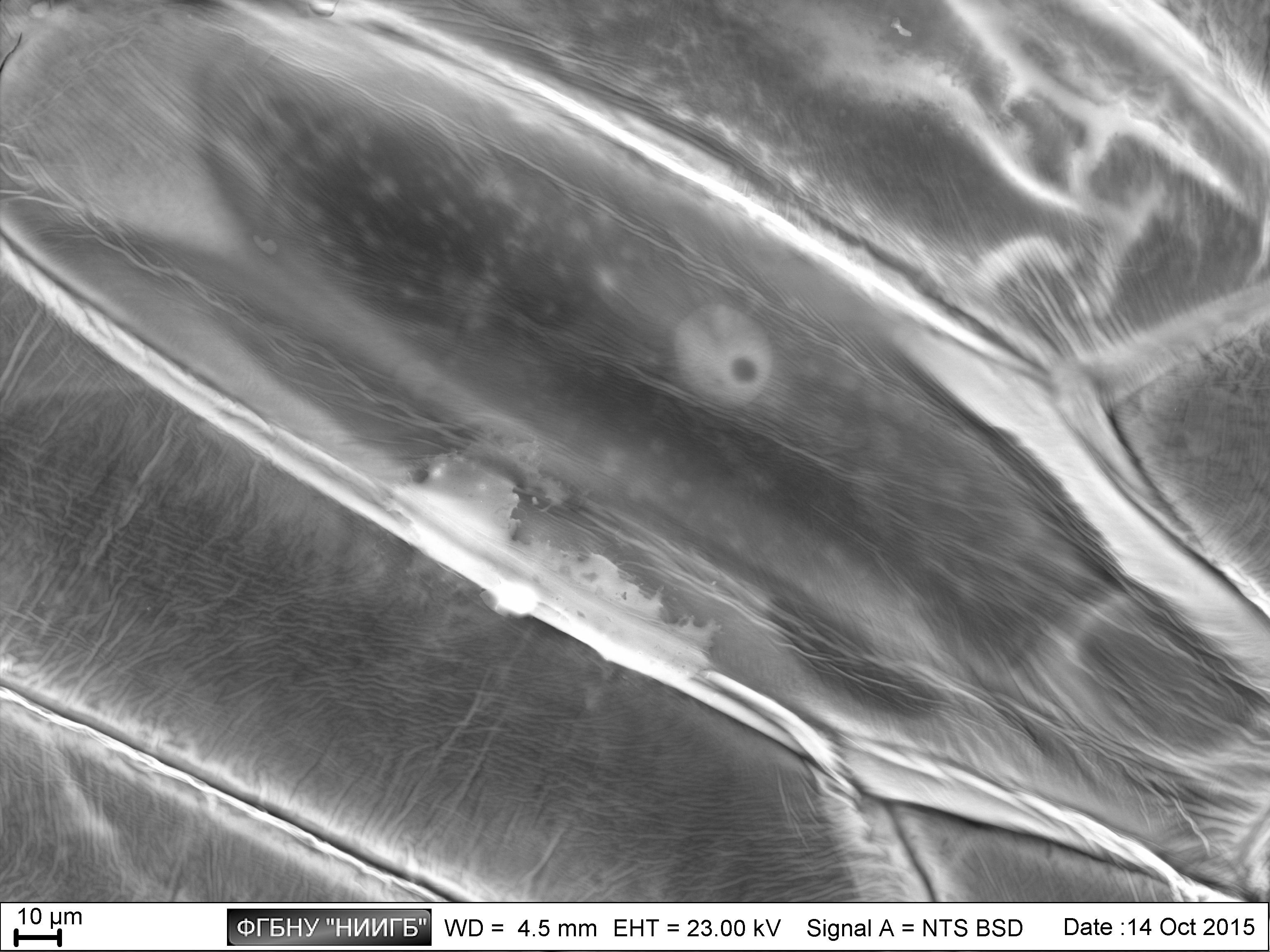
Epidermal cells from the inner surface of an onion flake. Beneath the shagreen-like cell walls one can see nuclei and small organelles floating in the cytoplasm. This BSE-image of a lanthanoid-stained sample was taken without prior fixation, dehydration, or sputtering.

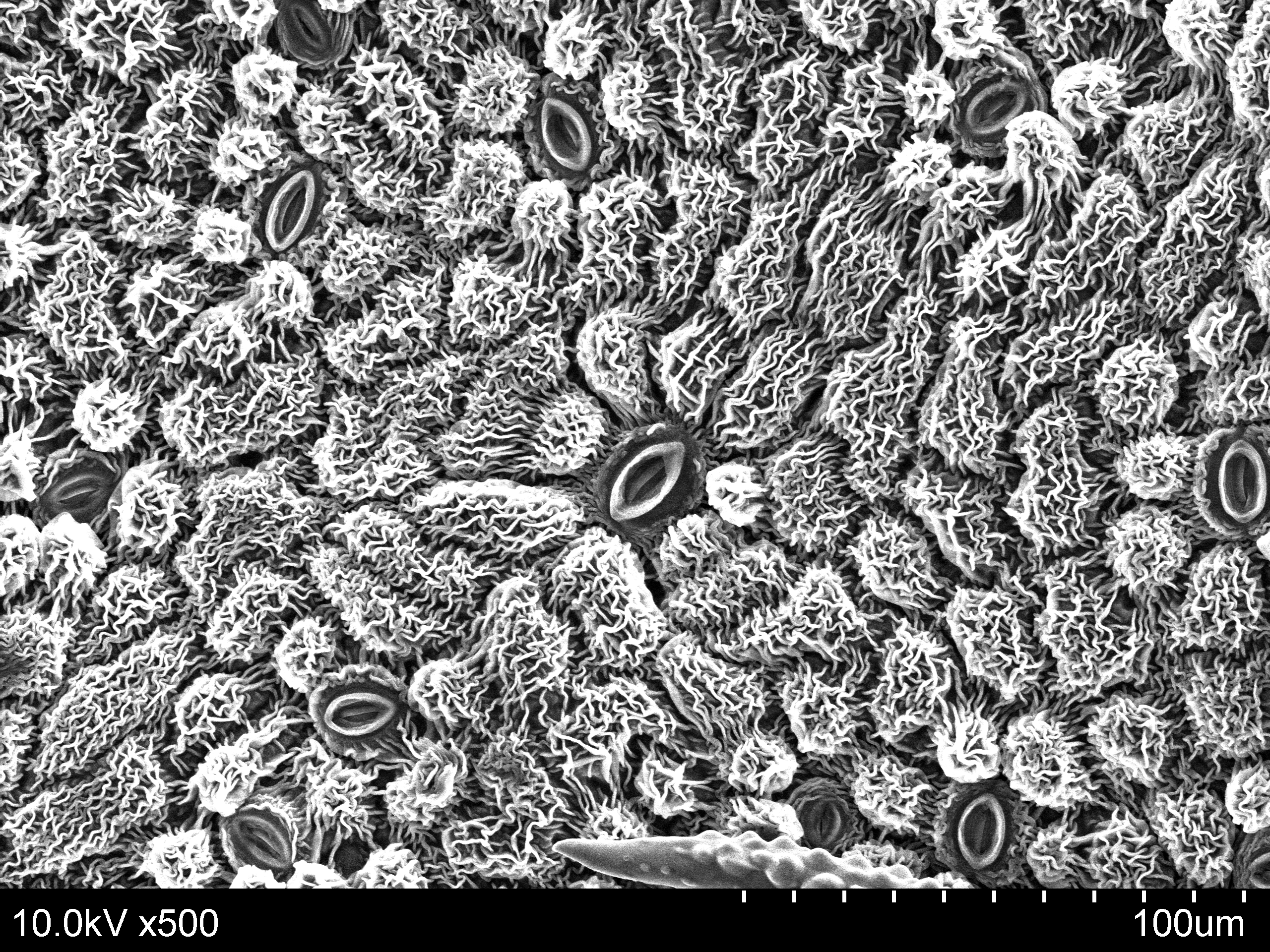
SEM image of stomata on the lower surface of a leaf

== See also ==
- Applications for electron microscopy
- Electron microscopy
- Energy-dispersive X-ray spectroscopy
- Cathodoluminescence microscope
- Forensic engineering
- Forensic science
- List of materials analysis methods
- Microscopy
- Scanning helium microscopy
- Teeny Ted from Turnip Town (World's smallest book requires a scanning electron microscope to read).
- Transmission electron microscopy (TEM)
