= Alison Gurney =

Professor of Pharmacology

Professor Alison M. Gurney
- Born: 1957 (age 68–69); Ayr, Scotland
- Education: University of Aberdeen; University College London
- Known for: Mechanisms of ganglion block; Identification of ion channels regulating membrane potential in vascular smooth muscle; Mechanisms of vasodilation
- Scientific career
- Fields: Pharmacology; Ion channels; vascular smooth muscle
- Workplaces: California Institute of Technology; United Medcical and Dental Schools (now King's College London); University of Strathclyde; University of Manchester
- Thesis: Effects of methonium compounds on rat submandibular ganglion cells (1982)
- Doctoral advisor: Humphrey Rang
- Other academic advisors: Henry Lester
- Website: Official website

Alison Marion Gurney (born 1957) is professor of Pharmacology at the University of Manchester. She previously held the W.C. Bowman Chair of Pharmacology at the University of Strathclyde, where she was the first female appointed to a science professorship and the first female Professor of Pharmacology in Scotland. She is known for her research into the pharmacology and physiological roles of ion channels, especially in the pulmonary circulation.

== Education ==
Gurney was educated at Prestwick Academy before attending the University of Aberdeen, where she graduated with a BSc degree in Pharmacology in 1979, then University College London, where she obtained a PhD in Pharmacology under the supervision of Professor Humphrey Rang. Together they identified a novel mechanism by which drugs that block neurotransmission across autonomic ganglia interact with neuronal nicotinic receptors.

== Career and research ==
In 1982, Gurney moved to California to carry out postdoctoral research with Henry Lester at the California Institute of Technology, making use of novel light-sensitive compounds to study the interactions between drugs and receptors. She returned to the UK in 1985 to take up a lectureship in pharmacology at the United Medical and Dental Schools of Guy's and St Thomas's hospitals (now part of King's College), where she established a laboratory investigating ion channels in the cardiovascular system as a target for drugs to treat cardiovascular disease. While there she identified a positive feedback effect of cytoplasmic Ca^{2+} on cardiac calcium channels, a role for ATP-sensitive potassium channels in regulating the membrane potential of artery smooth muscle cells and the main features of the ion channels that set the resting potential of pulmonary artery smooth muscle cells.

After 10 years in London, Gurney moved to Glasgow to take up the W.C. Bowman Chair of Pharmacology at the University of Strathclyde. For the next 10 years she continued studying the pulmonary circulation, identifying key roles for store-operated SOC channels and the two-pore-domain potassium channel TASK-1 in regulating pulmonary artery tone and in the development of pulmonary hypertension. Along with physicists Allister Ferguson and John Girkin, she founded the Centre for Biophotonics and acted as its Director for the next 5 years. In 2005, Gurney moved to the University of Manchester, where she continues to study ion channels in pulmonary artery disease, identifying KCNQ channels as a possible biological target for drugs to treat pulmonary hypertension.

=== Recognition ===
Gurney was awarded the British Pharmacological Society Sandoz prize for her research in pharmacology in 1991, the Royal Pharmaceutical Society of Great Britain Conference Science Medal in 1992 and a Royal Society Leverhulme Trust Senior Research Fellowship in 2002.

One of Gurney's papers, "The channel-blocking action of methonium compounds on rat submandibular ganglion cells" was recognised in "Landmarks in Pharmacology", a collection of the most significant papers published by the British Journal of Pharmacology during its first 50 years.
