= Heavy mineral sands ore deposits =

Ore deposits of rare earth metals

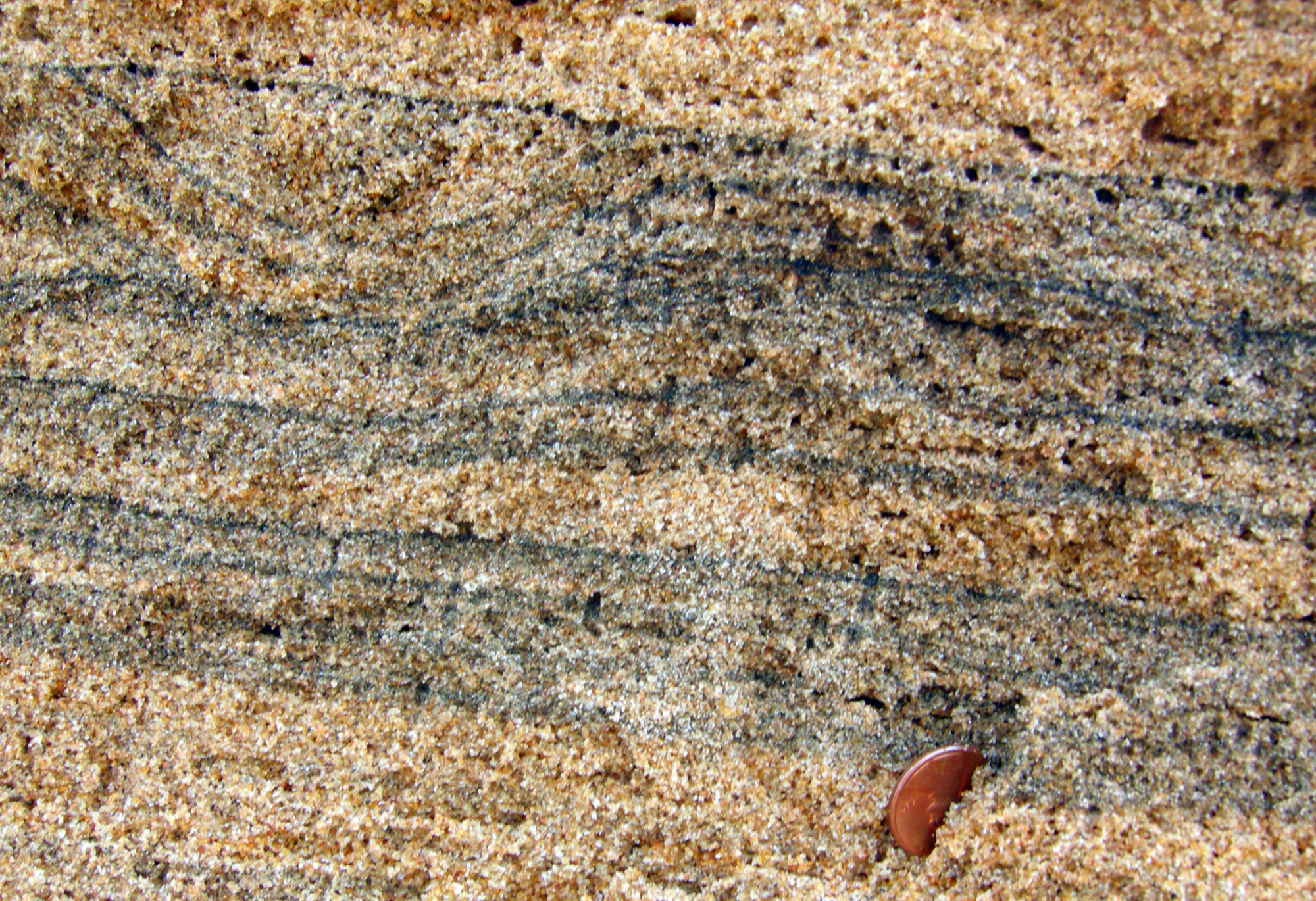
Heavy minerals (dark) in a quartz beach sand (Chennai, India).

Heavy mineral sands are a class of ore deposit which is an important source of zirconium, titanium, thorium, tungsten, rare-earth elements, the industrial minerals diamond, sapphire, garnet, and occasionally precious metals or gemstones.

Heavy mineral sands are placer deposits formed most usually in beach environments by concentration due to the specific gravity of the mineral grains. It is equally likely that some concentrations of heavy minerals (aside from the usual gold placers) exist within streambeds, but most are of a low grade and are relatively small.

== Grade and tonnage distribution ==
Estimated ilmenite production in thousands of tons for 2006 according to U.S. Geological Survey
- Country: Production
Australia	1,140
South Africa	952
Canada	809
China	400
Norway	380
United States	300
Ukraine	220
India	200
Brazil	130
Vietnam	100
Mozambique	(750)
Madagascar	(700)
Senegal	(150)
Other countries	120
Total world	4,800

The grade of a typical heavy mineral sand ore deposit is usually low. Within the 21st century, the lowest cut-off grades of heavy minerals, as a total heavy mineral (THM) concentrate from the bulk sand, in most ore deposits of this type is around 1% heavy minerals, although several are higher grade.

Of this total heavy mineral concentrate (THM), the components are typically

- Zircon, from 1% of THM to upwards of 50% of THM,
- Ilmenite, generally of 10% to 60% of THM
- Rutile, from 5% to 25% of THM
- Leucoxene, from 1% to 10% of THM
- Gangue, typically quartz, magnetite, garnet, chromite and kyanite, which usually account for the remaining bulk of the THM content
- Slimes, typically minerals as above and heavy clay minerals, too fine to be economically extracted.

Generally, as zircon is the most valuable component and a critical ore component, high-zircon sands are the most valuable. Thereafter, rutile, leucoxene and then ilmenite in terms of value given to the ore. As a generality, typically the valuable components of the THM concentrate rarely exceed 30%.

Being ancient stranded dune systems, the tonnage of most deposits is in excess of several tens of millions of tonnes to several hundred million tonnes. For example; the medium-sized Coburn mineral sands deposit, Western Australia, is 230 million tonnes at 1.1% heavy minerals, and is 13 km long.

The Tormin mine, on the Western Cape of South Africa's coastline, provides a unique ocean beach feature, which exposes the resource to wave and tidal conditions that result in a natural jigging effect. Large proportions of the quartz and light heavies waste material are removed by the ocean tidal action, resulting in run of mine (ROM) grades as high as 86% heavy mineral concentrate (HMC).

== Sources ==
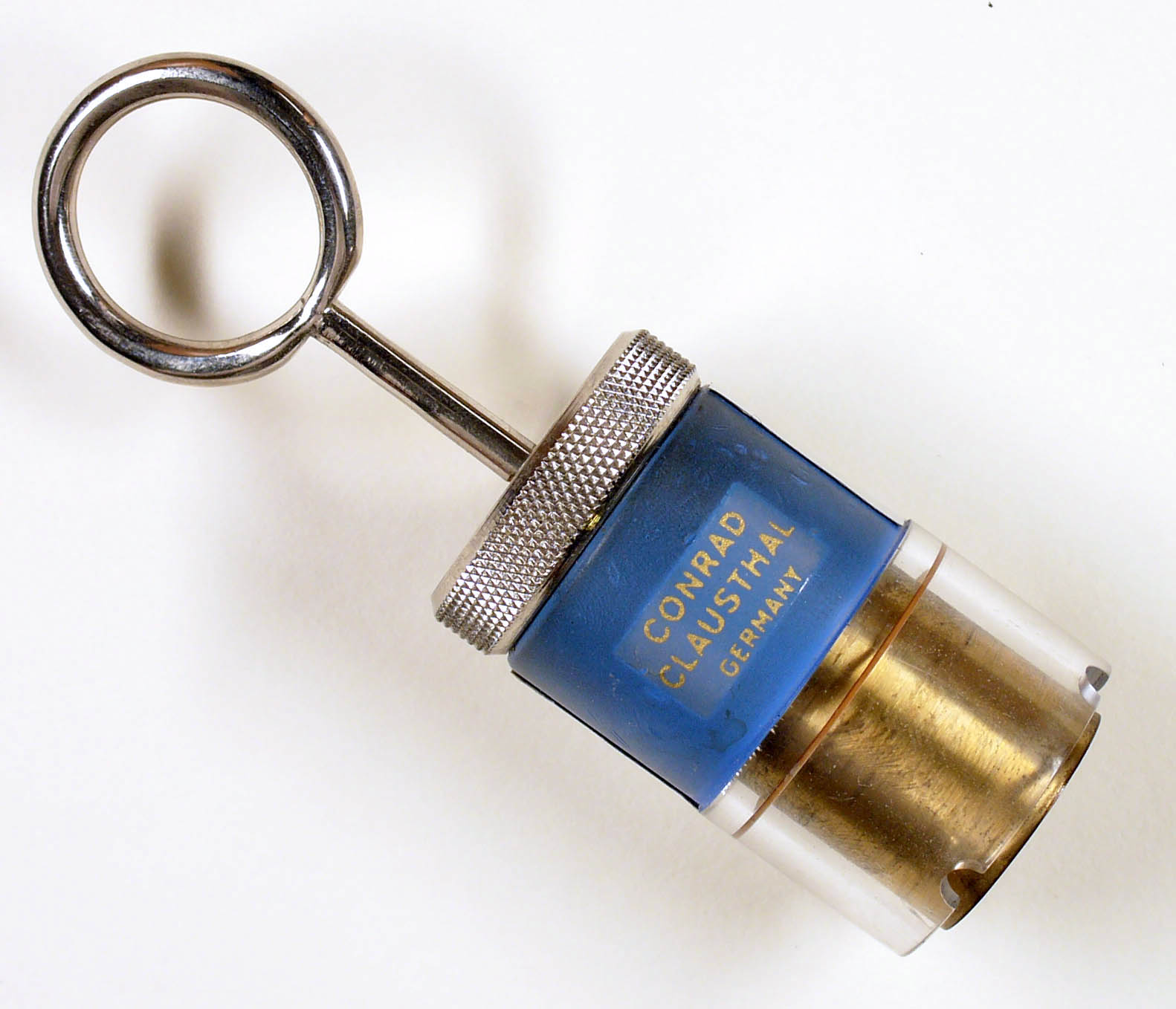
Magnetic hand separator for heavy minerals

The source of heavy mineral sands is in a hardrock source within the erosional areas of a river which carries its load of sediment into the ocean, where the sediments are caught up in littoral drift or longshore drift. Rocks are occasionally eroded directly by wave action shed detritus, which is caught up in longshore drift and washed up onto beaches where the lighter minerals are winnowed.

The source rocks which provide the heavy mineral sands determine the composition of the economic minerals. The source of zircon, monazite, rutile, sometimes tungsten, and some ilmenite is usually granite. The source of ilmenite, garnet, sapphire and diamond is ultramafic and mafic rocks, such as kimberlite or basalt. Garnet is also sourced commonly from metamorphic rocks, such as amphibolite schists. Precious metals are sourced from ore deposits hosted within metamorphic rocks.

== Transport ==
The accumulation of a heavy mineral deposit requires a source of sediment containing heavy minerals onto a beach system in a volume which exceeds the rate of removal from the trap site. For this reason not all beaches which are supplied by sands containing heavy minerals will form economic concentrations of the minerals. This factor can be qualitatively or quantitatively measured through the ZTR index.

== Trap ==
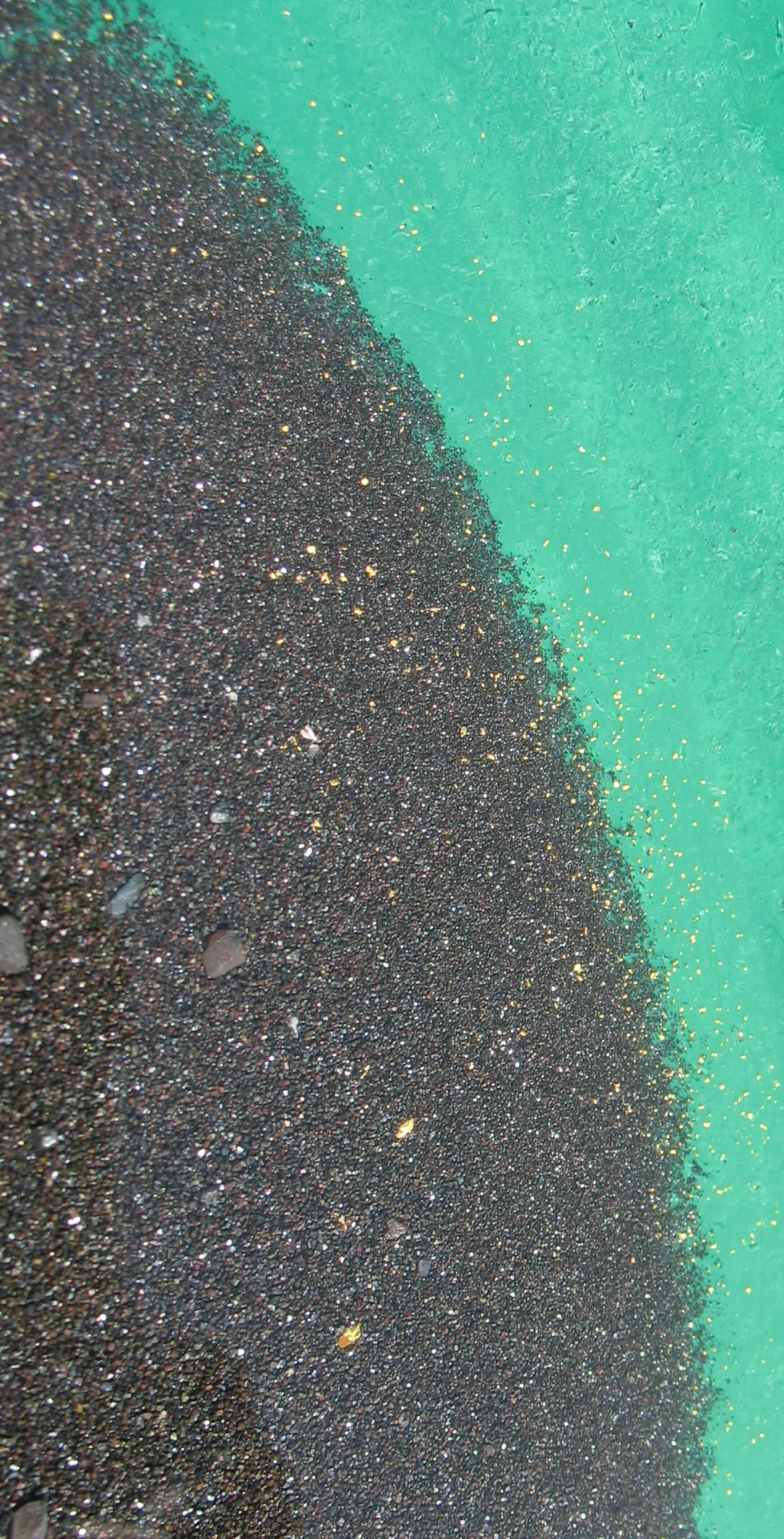
Black sand concentrates

The heavy minerals within the source sediments attain an economic concentration by accumulation within low-energy environments in streams and most usually on beaches. In beach placer deposits the lowest energy zone on the beach is the swash zone, where turbulent surf washes up on the beach face and loses energy. In this zone heavier grains accumulate and become stranded because they are denser than the quartz grains they accompany. It is for this reason that beach placer deposits are often referred to as "strand-line deposits".

The size and position of a heavy mineral deposit is a function of the wave energy reaching the beach, the mean grainsize of the beach sediments, and the current height of the ocean.

Anecdotal reports of certain beach placers forming in modern times suggest that the greatest enrichment tended to occur in storm events energetic enough to remove most of the beach's sediment load—a process favoring the lighter minerals. The resultant 'clinker' sands left behind were mined during low tide following major storm events, suggesting that most beach placer deposits are formed during such cycles.

Fossilised dune systems often are exploited for heavy mineral sands because they are from the ocean and because they are often remnants of previous intraglacial highstands.

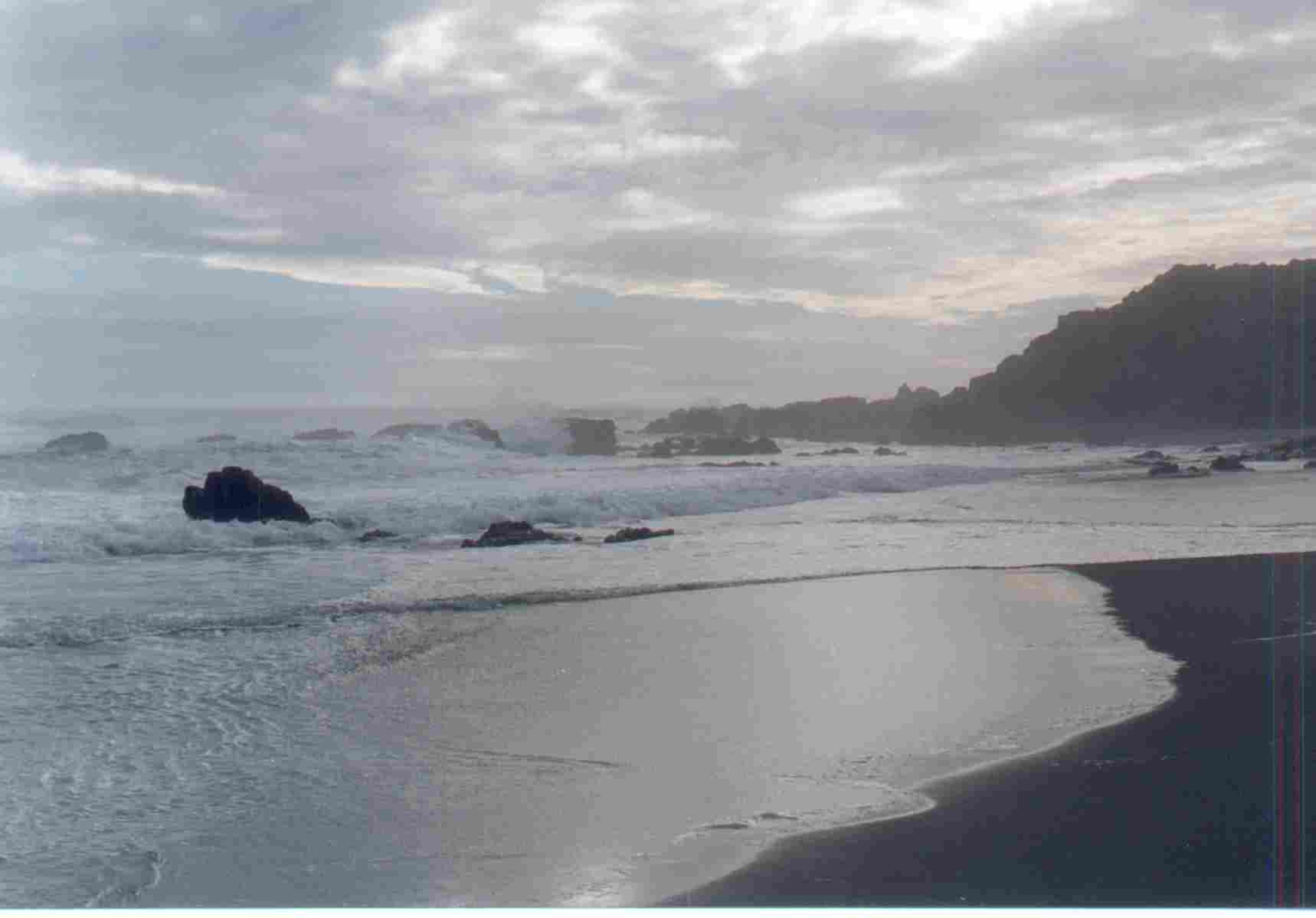
Geelwal Karoo mineral sand deposit, on the west coast of South Africa.

Tectonic activity, which results in coastlines rising from the ocean, may also cause a beach system to become stranded above the high-water mark and lock in the heavy mineral sands. Similarly, a beach system that is drowned by the subsidence of a coastline may be preserved, often for millions of years, until it either is covered by sedimentation or rises from the ocean.

Specific trap sites for heavy mineral sand placer deposits are in beaches on the leeward side of headlands, where low-energy zones trap sediments carried along by the longshore drift. Also, sand bars developed at the mouths of rivers that feed the placer deposits are rich trap sites where the winnowing action of the waves is most efficient, because heavy minerals too heavy to be moved will deposit at an isthmus in preference to drifting farther down the beach.

== Diamond sands ==
The coast of Namibia is host to economic diamantiferous beach sands, which are exploited by building sea walls and isolating stretches of coastline. The beaches are so isolated that they are sometimes processed in their entirety, down to the bedrock, in search of diamonds. Such deposits have been sought around the world, with sporadic reports of high-value stones but no instances of economic quantities of sediment.

== Environmental concerns ==
The mining of beach sands and of fossilized beach placers is often controversial because the operation requires the strip mining of large areas. Often this land is in ecologically sensitive surroundings and contains fragile ecosystems built up on poor sandy soils.

Documented impacts of large-scale coastal heavy mineral sands mining include the disturbance of dune ecosystems, loss of agricultural land, changes in groundwater systems, and pressures on local livelihoods dependent on fishing and small-scale farming. In the fertile areas of Senegal's Grande Côte area, for example, where the extraction of heavy mineral sands has caused environmental degradation, threats to livelihoods and community tensions, there is a complex trade-off between economic growth, environmental sustainability and social equity.

The mining process is ideally modelled on the extraction operations underway in Australia, where the strip mining is followed by rehabilitation of the mined areas including intensive re-vegetation with ecologically similar species, re-contouring of the land to its original shape, including dunes, and management of groundwater resources. Modern mining practices tend to favor dry mining rather than dredging operations, due to the advent of electrostatic mineral separation processes.

In practice, not all mining of sub-Saharan African deposits is carried out in such an environmentally responsible manner, although some South African mines do practice dune rehabilitation . The mining of the coast of South America, in particular Chile and Ecuador, is carried out in an environmentally responsible manner.

Examples of environmentally sensitive and politically sensitive mineral sand mining operations that have gained public attention and galvanised environmental activism responses to mining proposals include the Tuart-Ludlow mineral sands mine, Western Australia, and the culmination of conservationist efforts to preserve Rainbow Beach and Fraser Island, Queensland, Australia. These latter campaigns successfully lobbied government and saw Fraser Island and Rainbow Beach protected by the High Court of Australia; however, the Tuart-Ludlow campaign failed to prevent mining works in the Tuart forests in coastal Western Australia.

Similar mineral sand mining operations were carried out for 35 years in and adjacent to National Parks at Hawks Nest, New South Wales, and continue on Stradbroke Island, Queensland.

== See also ==
- Ore genesis
- Black sand
