= Tsilaisite =

General
- Category: Tourmaline
- Formula: NaMn^{2+}_{3}Al_{6}Si_{6}O_{18}(BO_{3})_{3}(OH)_{3}OH
- IMA symbol: Tsl
- Crystal system: Trigonal

Identification
- Mohs scale hardness: 7 to 7.5
- Luster: Vitreous
- Streak: White

Tsilaisite is a manganese rich variety of elbaite tourmaline. It is also known as Tsilaizite. Tsilaisite is related Fluor-tsilaisite. The gem is named after the location it was first found.

== History ==
It was first reported in the Tsilaisina (also called Tsilaizina) Mine in Vakinankaratra, Madagascar.

The gem was originally described as tsilaisite. But then it was discredited in 2006. In 2011 it was reapproved as tsilaisite.

== Characteristics ==
=== Color ===
In plane polarized light, the gem is pleochroic. Tsilaisite can be deep pink, red, orangish-yellow, brownish-gold, or greenish-yellow.

=== Chemistry ===
Manganese makes up to 3% of the gem's chemistry.
