= Fluor-liddicoatite =

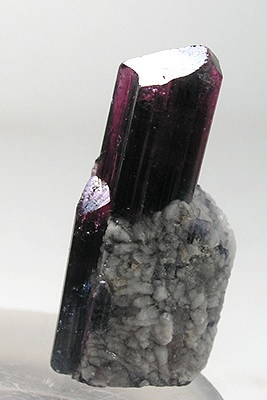
- Liddicoatite from the Ambesabora pegmatite, Madagascar. Photo Rob Lavinsky

General
- Category: Cyclosilicate; Tourmaline Group
- Formula: Ca(Li_{2}Al)Al_{6}(BO_{3})_{3}Si_{6}O_{18}(OH)_{3}F
- IMA symbol: Fld
- Strunz classification: 9.CK.05 (10 ed); 8/E.19-80 (8 ed)
- Dana classification: 61.3.1.2
- Crystal system: Trigonal
- Crystal class: Ditrigonal pyramidal (3m) (same H-M symbol)
- Space group: R3m

Identification
- Formula mass: 945.8 g/mol
- Color: Usually smoky brown, but also pink, red, green, blue, or rarely white.
- Crystal habit: Stout prismatic, with a curved convex trigonal outline
- Cleavage: Poor or absent on {0001}
- Fracture: Uneven to conchoidal
- Tenacity: Brittle
- Mohs scale hardness: 7 1/2
- Luster: Vitreous
- Streak: White to very light brown
- Diaphaneity: Transparent to translucent
- Specific gravity: 3.02
- Optical properties: Uniaxial (−)
- Refractive index: N_{o} = 1.637, N_{e} = 1.621
- Pleochroism: Strong: O dark brown or pink, E light brown or pale pink
- Other characteristics: Not fluorescent, not radioactive

Fluor-liddicoatite is a rare member of the tourmaline group of minerals, elbaite subgroup, and the theoretical calcium endmember of the elbaite-fluor-liddicoatite series; the pure end-member has not yet been found in nature. Fluor-liddicoatite is indistinguishable from elbaite by X-ray diffraction techniques. It forms a series with elbaite and probably also with olenite. Liddiocoatite is currently a non-approved mineral name, but Aurisicchio et al. (1999) and Breaks et al. (2008) found OH-dominant species. Formulae are

- Fluor-liddicoatite Ca(Li_{2}Al)Al_{6}(BO_{3})_{3}Si_{6}O_{18}(OH)_{3}F
- Elbaite Na(Al_{1.5}Li_{1.5})Al_{6}(BO_{3})_{3}Si_{6}O_{18}(OH)_{4}
- Olenite NaAl_{9}B_{3}Si_{6}O_{27}O_{3}(OH)

Fluor-liddicoatite was named in 1977 after Richard T. Liddicoat (1918–2002) gemmologist and president of the Gemological Institute of America, who is well known for introducing the GIA diamond grading system in 1953.

== Unit cell ==
Fluor-liddicoatite belongs to the trigonal crystal system, class 3 m, space group R 3m. It has a rhombohedral lattice, with unit cell parameters

- a = 15.867 Å to 15.875 Å
- c = 7.135 Å to 7.126 Å
- Z = 3 (there are 3 formula units per unit cell).

== Structure ==
Fluor-liddicoatite is isostructural with (has the same structure as) all members of the tourmaline group, which are cyclosilicates with the general formula

- XY_{3}Z_{6}(BO_{3})_{3}Si_{6}O_{18}(OH,O)_{3}(OH,F).

For fluor-liddicoatite, the X sites are occupied by Ca, the Y sites by Li or Al and the Z sites by Al, giving the formula

- Ca(Li_{2}Al)Al_{6}(BO_{3})_{3}Si_{6}O_{18}(OH)_{3}F.

The Y sites are octahedrally coordinated by oxygen O and hydroxyl OH ions; three octahedra surround the three-fold axis at the origin, and each octahedron shares an edge with each of its two nearest neighbours. The silicon Si ions are tetrahedrally coordinated by O, forming SiO_{4} groups. These tetrahedra form six-membered rings, with two of the four Os in each tetrahedron shared between adjacent tetrahedra. So the formula for the ring is Si_{6}O_{18}. In each Si tetrahedron an O at one free apex is shared with one of the Y octahedra. The boron B ions occur in triangular coordination, each triangle sharing a common apex with two Y octahedra. This composite unit is linked to others like it by aluminum Al ions at the Z sites, and its outer oxygen atoms are also atoms of the aluminum coordination octahedra. The X sites are sandwiched between the units along the c axis.

== Crystal habit ==
Crystals are stout prismatic, with a curved convex trigonal outline, generally elongated and striated parallel to the c axis. Crystals are hemimorphic, meaning that the two ends of the crystal have different forms. Fluor-liddicoatite usually has a pedion (a single crystal face) opposite one or two pyramids.

== Physical properties ==
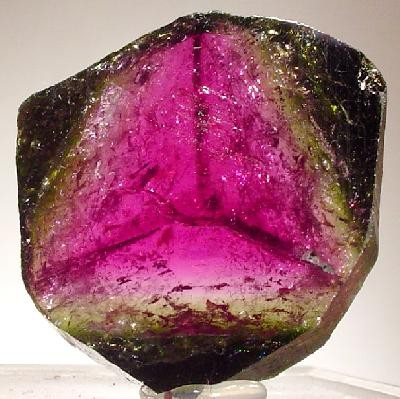
A polished slice of liddicoatite from Madagascar. Photo Rob Lavinsky

The color is usually smoky brown, but also pink, red, green, blue, or rarely white. Color zoning is abundant at the type locality, parallel to pyramid faces. This is due to changes in the solution during crystal growth. As the concentration of trace elements that serve as coloring agents changes, there will be areas of less or more color in different parts of the crystal. When the crystal is sliced perpendicular to the c axis, triangular zoning may be seen, together with a trigonal star that radiates from the centre of the crystal, with the three rays directed towards the corners of the triangular color patterns.
The pink-red color is due to the manganese Mn^{3+} content, and the green color is due to intervalence charge transfer transactions between iron Fe^{2+} and titanium Ti^{4+}.
The streak is white to very light brown, lighter than the mass color, luster is vitreous and crystals are transparent to translucent.
Cleavage is poor perpendicular to the c crystal axis, or it may be totally absent. The mineral is brittle, with an uneven to conchoidal fracture. It is very hard, with hardness 7 1/2, a little harder than zircon, making it suitable for use as a gemstone. Specific gravity is 3.02, a little lighter than fluorite. It is neither fluorescent nor radioactive.

== Optical properties ==
Fluor-liddicoatite is uniaxial (-), with refractive Indices N_{o} = 1.637 and N_{e} = 1.621 for the type specimen. The refractive indices, however, will vary from specimen to specimen, as they depend on the content of iron and manganese, which are usually present as trace elements. Pleochroism is strong: O dark brown or pink, E light brown or pale pink.

== Environment ==
Fluor-liddicoatite is detrital in soil at the type locality, presumably derived from the weathering of granitic pegmatites. Associated minerals are quartz, elbaite, albite and micas.

== Localities ==
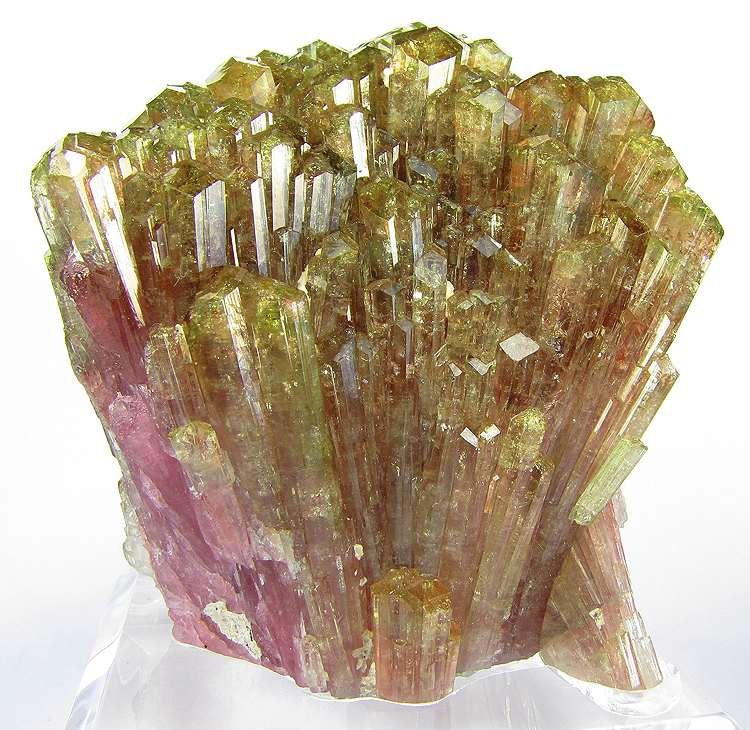
A spectacular radiating spray of liddicoatite crystals, from the Minh Tien Mine, Luc Yen, Vietnam. Size: 8.5 x 7.6 x 4.7 cm.

The type locality is Anjanabonoina, Tsilaizina, Antsirabe, Madagascar. Type Material is stored at the National Museum of Natural History, Smithsonian Institution, Washington, D.C., US, catalogue #135815; further type material is stored at the Natural History Museum, London, the Royal Ontario Museum, Canada and the Geological Survey of Canada.

- Deep brilliant red, highly lustrous, prismatic fluor-liddicoatite has been found as large sheaves of near parallel, slightly divergent crystals, at the Minh Tien pegmatite, Luc Yen District, in Vietnam.
- At Ambalabe, Manapa, near Betafo, Madagascar, very lustrous, striated, short prismatic fluor-liddicoatite crystals with trigonal terminations have been found, loose or on pegmatite matrix; they are a very dark greenish brown to black, but have rich red internal highlights, and resting on a few of their surfaces are sharp, lustrous, snow-white dodecahedral crystals of londonite.
- In Tsarafara in the Sahatany Valley, Vakinankaratra Region, Madagascar, striated, lustrous, gemmy, color-zoned fluor-liddicoatite crystals have been found. Most of these have red tips and green middle zones, some with as many as five distinct color bands. Some of the crystals rest on greyish quartz.
