= Lục Yên district =

Lục Yên District Huyện Lục Yên
- District
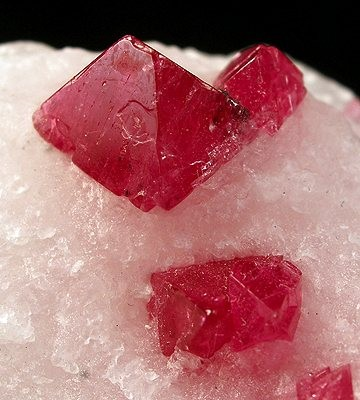
- Spinel on marble, Lục Yên District
- Interactive map of Lục Yên District
- Coordinates: 22.083°N 104.750°E
- Country: Vietnam
- Region: Northeast
- Province: Yên Bái
- Capital: Yên Thế
- Subdivision: 1 townships and 23 rural communes

Government
  - Type: District

Area
  - Total: 811 km^{2} (313 sq mi)

Population (2019)
  - Total: 108,817
  - Density: 134/km^{2} (348/sq mi)
- Time zone: UTC+7 (UTC + 7)
- Website: lucyen.yenbai.gov.vn

Lục Yên is a former rural district of Yên Bái province, in the Northeast region of Vietnam. As of 2019, the district had a population of 108,817. The district covers an area of 811 km^{2}. The district capital lies at Yên Thế. Numerous quarries in the district produce gemstones such as rubies, spinel, and tourmaline.

== Administrative divisions ==
Lục Yên is divided into 24 commune-level sub-divisions, including the township of Yên Thế and 23 rural communes (An Lạc, An Phú, Động Quan, Khai Trung, Khánh Hòa, Khánh Thiện, Lâm Thượng, Liễu Đô, Mai Sơn, Minh Chuẩn, Mường Lai, Minh Tiến, Phan Thanh, Phúc Lợi, Tân Lập, Tân Lĩnh, Tân Phượng, Tô Mậu, Trúc Lâu, Trung Tâm, Vĩnh Lạc, Minh Xuân, Yên Thắng).

== Climate ==
Climate data for Lục Yên
Month	Jan	Feb	Mar	Apr	May	Jun	Jul	Aug	Sep	Oct	Nov	Dec	Year
Record high °C (°F)	30.6 (87.1)	34.4 (93.9)	36.3 (97.3)	38.0 (100.4)	41.3 (106.3)	40.7 (105.3)	38.8 (101.8)	39.0 (102.2)	37.5 (99.5)	35.0 (95.0)	34.0 (93.2)	31.0 (87.8)	41.3 (106.3)
Mean daily maximum °C (°F)	19.4 (66.9)	20.6 (69.1)	23.7 (74.7)	27.7 (81.9)	31.5 (88.7)	32.8 (91.0)	32.9 (91.2)	32.8 (91.0)	31.7 (89.1)	28.9 (84.0)	25.4 (77.7)	21.8 (71.2)	27.4 (81.3)
Daily mean °C (°F)	15.6 (60.1)	17.1 (62.8)	20.0 (68.0)	23.7 (74.7)	26.7 (80.1)	28.0 (82.4)	28.1 (82.6)	27.7 (81.9)	26.5 (79.7)	24.0 (75.2)	20.4 (68.7)	16.9 (62.4)	22.9 (73.2)
Mean daily minimum °C (°F)	13.4 (56.1)	15.0 (59.0)	17.8 (64.0)	21.1 (70.0)	23.6 (74.5)	24.9 (76.8)	25.1 (77.2)	24.7 (76.5)	23.6 (74.5)	21.3 (70.3)	17.7 (63.9)	14.2 (57.6)	20.2 (68.4)
Record low °C (°F)	0.9 (33.6)	5.3 (41.5)	6.0 (42.8)	11.8 (53.2)	15.5 (59.9)	17.6 (63.7)	19.6 (67.3)	20.3 (68.5)	16.3 (61.3)	12.1 (53.8)	7.0 (44.6)	2.7 (36.9)	0.9 (33.6)
Average precipitation mm (inches)	35.4 (1.39)	37.9 (1.49)	70.9 (2.79)	133.3 (5.25)	208.8 (8.22)	277.2 (10.91)	337.8 (13.30)	407.1 (16.03)	261.3 (10.29)	136.8 (5.39)	60.6 (2.39)	30.3 (1.19)	1,999.2 (78.71)
Average rainy days	12.2	13.0	16.4	17.5	15.0	16.0	19.2	19.2	14.1	11.8	8.7	7.6	170.9
Average relative humidity (%)	87.1	87.3	86.9	86.6	83.6	84.6	85.8	86.6	86.3	86.2	86.1	85.7	86.1
Mean monthly sunshine hours	48.9	49.0	56.7	94.3	153.1	147.6	162.8	169.1	156.7	122.0	103.0	90.1	1,350.9
Source: Vietnam Institute for Building Science and Technology
