= Fluor-uvite =

Mineral in the tourmaline group

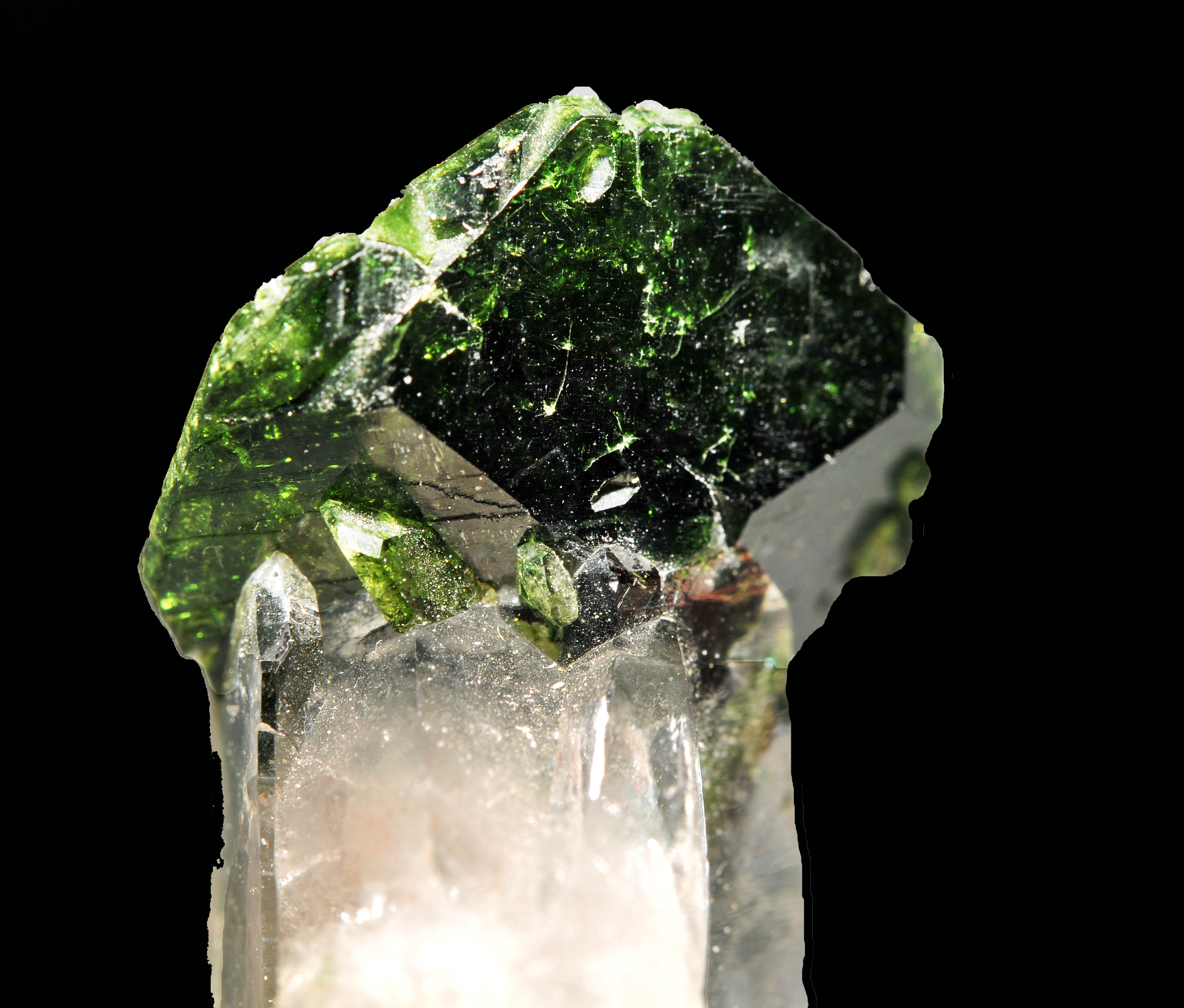
- Uvite on quartz

General
- Category: Cyclosilicate tourmaline group
- Formula: CaMg_{3}(Al_{5}Mg)(Si_{6}O_{18})(BO_{3})_{3}(OH)_{3}F
- IMA symbol: Fluvt
- Strunz classification: 9.CK.05
- Crystal system: Trigonal
- Crystal class: Ditrigonal pyramidal (3m); H-M symbol: (3m)
- Space group: R3m

Identification
- Color: Black, greenish-black, brownish-black, brown, green, colorless
- Cleavage: None Observed
- Fracture: Irregular/Uneven, Conchoidal
- Tenacity: Brittle
- Mohs scale hardness: 7.5
- Luster: Vitreous, Resinous
- Streak: Light-brown, light-green, or white
- Diaphaneity: Transparent, Translucent
- Density: 2.97 - 3.14 g/cm3
- Optical properties: Uniaxial (-)
- Birefringence: δ = 0.018 - 0.029
- Pleochroism: Weak

Fluor-uvite is a tourmaline mineral with the chemical formula CaMg_{3}(Al_{5}Mg)(Si_{6}O_{18})(BO_{3})_{3}(OH)_{3}F. It is a rare mineral that is found in calcium rich contact metamorphic rocks with increased amounts of boron. Uvite is trigonal hexagonal, which means that it has three equal length axes at 120 degrees, all perpendicular to its fourth axis which has a different length. Uvite is part of the space group 3m. Uvite's hardness has been measured to be 7.5 on the Mohs hardness scale. The color of uvite widely varies, depending on the sample, but is mostly deep green or brown. In regard to uvite's optical properties, it is uniaxial (-) and anisotropic, meaning that the velocity of light in the mineral depends on the path that it takes. In plane polarized light, uvite is colorless to pale yellow and shows weak pleochroism.

Uvite was first found in 1929 in Uva Province, Sri Lanka, hence the name.

Uvite has no use, but is commonly found in mineral specimen collections. The mineral is sought after by collectors because of its pronounced colors, crystal structure, and often large crystal size.
