= Povondraite =

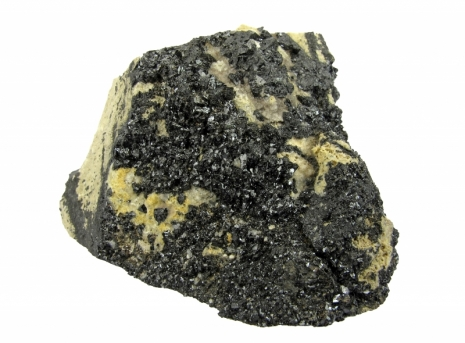
- The crystals here are black, lustrous, and 1-2mm in size. They richly cover one side of the matrix, and the povondraite winds its way through the fissures in the rock.

General
- Category: Cyclosilicates
- Formula: NaFe_{3}+3(Mg_{2}Fe_{3}+4)(Si_{6}O_{18})(BO_{3})3(OH)3O
- IMA symbol: Pov
- Strunz classification: 8/E.19-75
- Dana classification: 61.3.1.6
- Crystal system: Hexagonal-Rhomboidal
- Crystal class: Hemimorphic trigonal
- Space group: R3m (No. 160)
- Unit cell: a=16.18Å, c=7.44Å

Identification
- Formula mass: 1156.50 gm
- Colour: Dark brown to brown-black, black
- Crystal habit: Prismatic, striated
- Cleavage: None observed
- Fracture: Irregular, conchoidal
- Tenacity: Brittle
- Mohs scale hardness: 7
- Luster: Resinous
- Streak: Brown
- Diaphaneity: Translucent
- Refractive index: 1.74 - 1.82
- Birefringence: 0.069
- Common impurities: K,Mg,Al,Cu,Pb,Sn,Ti,V,H2O

Povondraite is a rare silicate mineral from the tourmaline group with formula: NaFe^{3+}_{3}(Fe^{3+}_{4},Mg_{2})(BO_{3})_{3}Si_{6}O_{18}(OH)_{3}O. It is a dark brown to black nearly opaque mineral with a resinous to splendent luster. It crystallizes in the trigonal crystal system as equant, distorted prisms with trigonal pyramid terminations.

It occurs as rare fracture and cavity encrustations within schists derived from sedimentary rocks. Associated minerals include quartz, potassium feldspar, muscovite, schorl, riebeckite and magnesite.

Discovered at the San Francisco mine, near Villa Tunari (in Alto Chapare), Bolivia, in 1976, originally it was called ferridravite, for the composition and the assumed relationship to dravite, i.e., "ferric dravite". However later investigations yielded a new empirical formula which had no relation to the dravite. This called for renaming, and the new name, after Pavel Povondra (1924–2013), a mineralogist at the Charles University in Prague, was approved by the International Mineralogical Association in the 1990s.
