= Rubellite =

Mineral

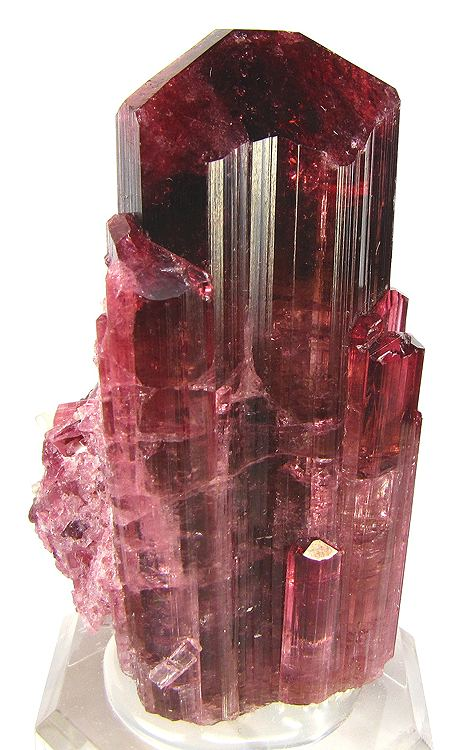

General
- Category: Tourmaline

Identification
- Color: Red, pink, pinkish, violet-red

Rubellite is the red or pink variety of tourmaline and is a member of the elbaite. It is also the rarest gem in its family. It is occasionally mistaken for ruby. These gems typically contain inclusions.

Notable countries where rubellite can be mined include Afghanistan, Brazil, Madagascar, Myanmar, Nigeria, Russia, and the United States.

== Name ==
Rubellite is named after the Latin word rubellus, meaning "reddish". The term rubellite was first used in 1794.

The gem is also called apatite, apyrite, rubellite, or rubylite.

== History ==
Rubellite crystals were known in Europe as early as Roman times, when specimens were imported from the East. However, these rubellite specimens were confused with other red gemstones, such as garnets and spinels.

== Value ==
Rubellite used to be the most expensive and prized gem in the tourmaline group, but has since been eclipsed by Paraiba tourmaline.

The most valuable specimens are intensely red and lack brown tones. Those with a ruby color are the most valuable.
