= Lucchesiite =

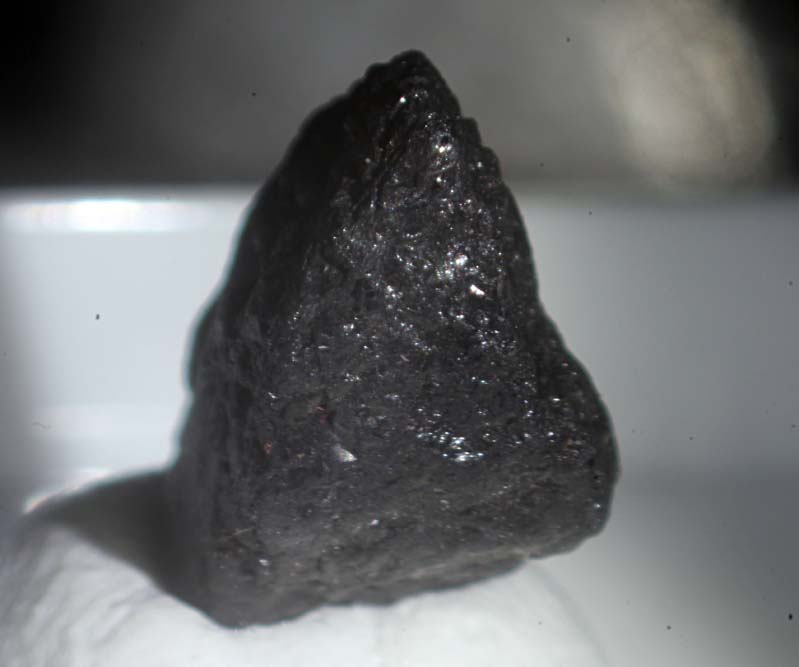

General
- Category: Cyclosilicates; Tourmaline group
- Formula: CaFe_{3}Al_{6}(Si_{6}O_{18})(BO_{3})_{3}(OH)_{3}O
- IMA symbol: Lcc
- Crystal system: Trigonal
- Crystal class: Ditrigonal pyramidal (3m) (same H-M symbol)
- Space group: R3m
- Unit cell: a = 16.00, c = 7.21 [Å] (approximated); Z = 3

Identification
- Color: Black
- Crystal habit: Thin tablets
- Fracture: Conchoidal
- Tenacity: Brittle
- Mohs scale hardness: 7
- Luster: Vitreous
- Streak: Grey
- Density: 3.21 (calc.), 3.24 (meas.) (approximated)
- Optical properties: Uniaxial (-)
- Pleochroism: Very dark brown to light brown

Lucchesiite is a new member of tourmaline-group of minerals. Lucchesiite has the formula CaFe_{3}Al_{6}(Si_{6}O_{18})(BO_{3})_{3}(OH)_{3}O. It is the calcium and oxygen-analogue of schorl. It has two co-type localizations, one in Czech Republic and the other in Sri Lanka. As the other members of the tourmaline group, it is trigonal.

== Notes on chemistry ==
Impurites in lucchesiite, depending on the provenience, are sodium, magnesium, aluminium, titanium, trivalent iron, and minor vanadium, potassium, manganese and zinc.
