= Elbaite =

Cyclosilicate, mineral

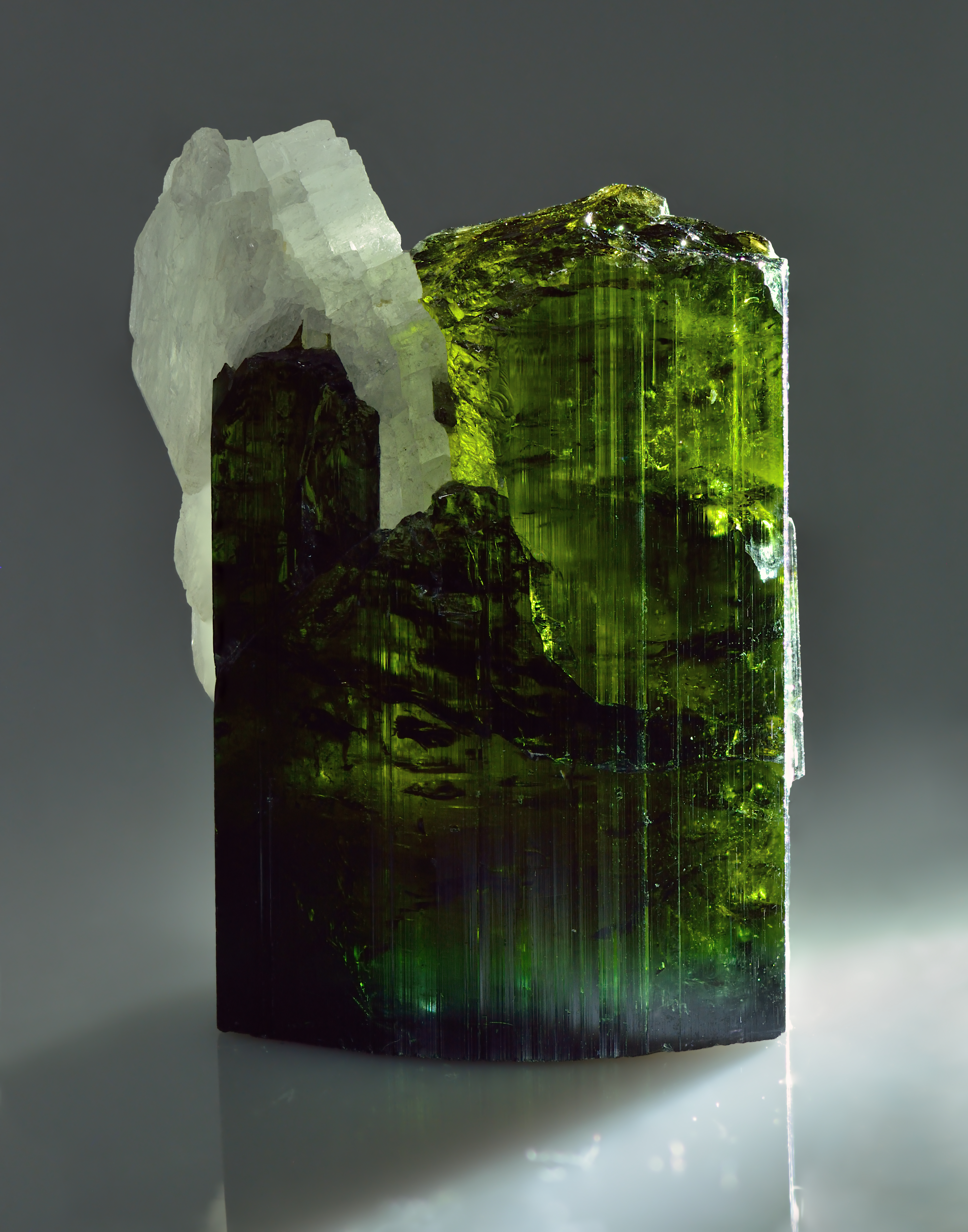

General
- Category: Cyclosilicate
- Formula: Na(Li_{1.5}Al_{1.5})Al_{6}Si_{6}O_{18}(BO_{3})_{3}(OH)_{4}
- IMA symbol: Elb
- Strunz classification: 9.CK.05
- Crystal system: Trigonal
- Crystal class: Ditrigonal pyramidal (3m); H–M symbol: (3m)
- Space group: R3m

Identification
- Color: Green, red to pink, blue, orange, yellow, colorless, multicolored
- Crystal habit: Prismatic; striated
- Cleavage: Poor/indistinct on {1120} and {1011}
- Fracture: Sub-conchoidal
- Mohs scale hardness: 7 1/2
- Luster: Vitreous
- Streak: White
- Diaphaneity: Transparent to opaque
- Density: 2.9–3.2
- Optical properties: Uniaxial (−); moderate relief
- Refractive index: n_{ω} = 1.635–1.650, n_{ε} = 1.615–1.632
- Birefringence: δ = 0.020
- Other characteristics: piezoelectric and pyroelectric

Major varieties
- Achroite: colorless
- Indicolite: blue
- Rubellite: red to pink
- Verdelite: green

Elbaite, a sodium, lithium, aluminium boro-silicate, with the chemical composition Na(Li_{1.5}Al_{1.5})Al_{6}Si_{6}O_{18}(BO_{3})_{3}(OH)_{4}, is a mineral species belonging to the six-member ring cyclosilicate tourmaline group.

Elbaite forms three series, with dravite, with fluor-liddicoatite, and with schorl. Due to these series, specimens with the ideal endmember formula are not found occurring naturally.

As a gemstone, elbaite is a desirable member of the tourmaline group because of the variety and depth of its colours and quality of the crystals. Originally discovered on the island of Elba, Italy in 1913, it has since been found in many parts of the world. In 1994, a major locality was discovered in Canada, at O'Grady Lakes in the Yukon.

Elbaite forms in igneous and metamorphic rocks and veins in association with lepidolite, microcline, and spodumene in granite pegmatites; with andalusite and biotite in schist; and with molybdenite and cassiterite in massive hydrothermal replacement deposits.

Elbaite is allochromatic, meaning trace amounts of impurities can tint crystals, and it can be strongly pleochroic. Every color of the rainbow may be represented by elbaite, some exhibiting multicolor zonation. Microscopic acicular inclusions in some elbaite crystals show the cat's eye effect in polished cabochons.

== Elbaite varieties ==
- Colorless: achroite variety (from Ancient Greek άχρωμος (ákhrōmos) 'colorless')
- Red or pinkish-red: rubellite variety (from ruby)
- Light blue to bluish green: Brazilian indicolite variety (from indigo)
- Green: Brazilian verdelite variety (from emerald)
- Watermelon tourmaline is a zoned variety with a reddish center surrounded by a green outer zone resembling watermelon rind, evident in cross-sectional slices of prisms, often displaying curved sides.

== Gallery ==
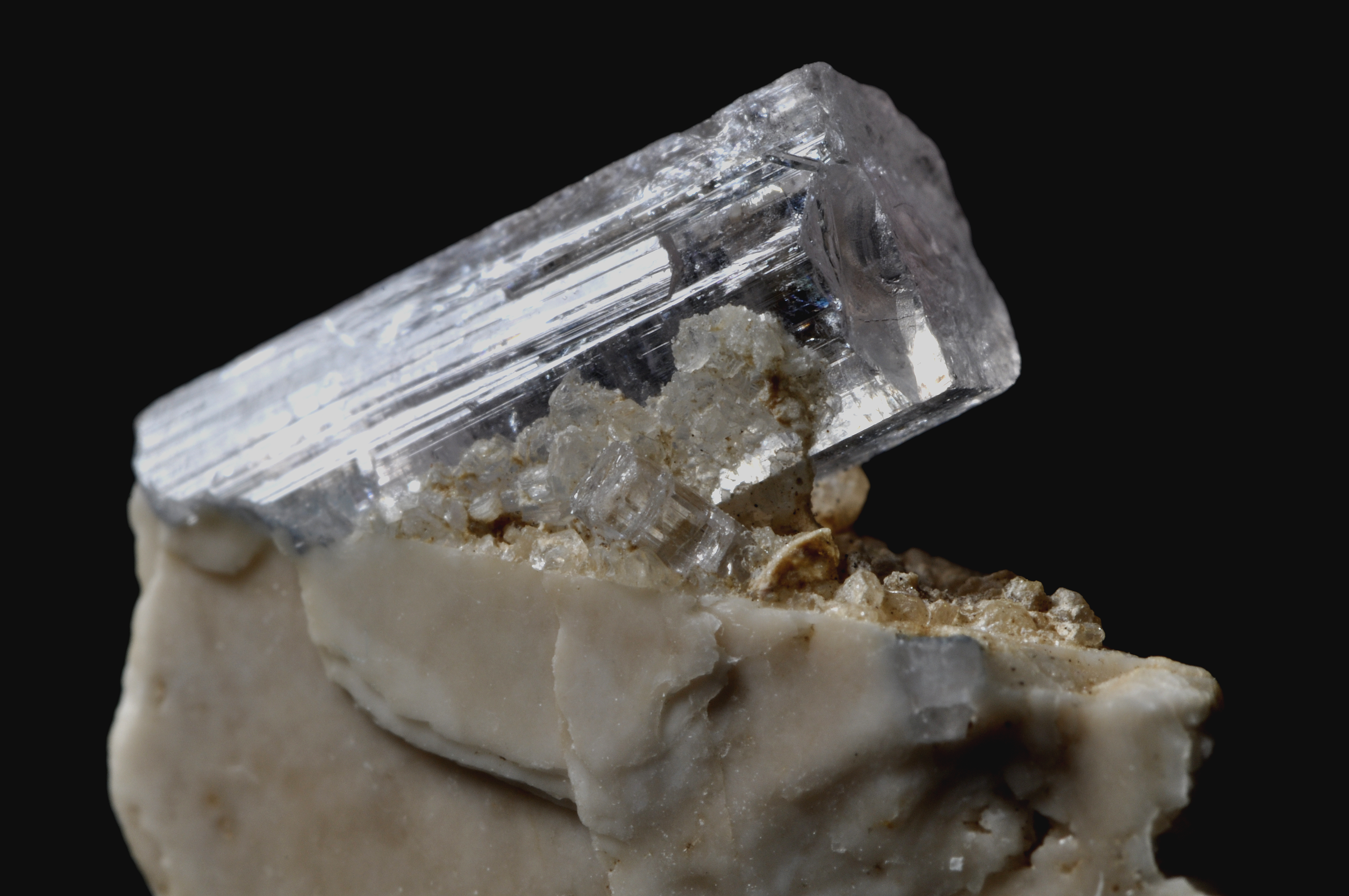
Achroite

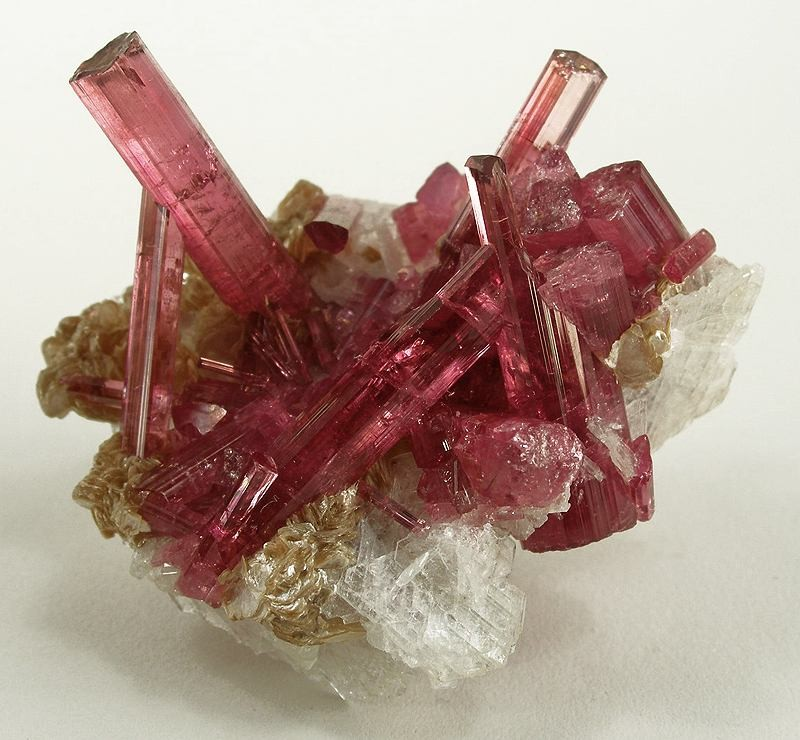
Rubellite

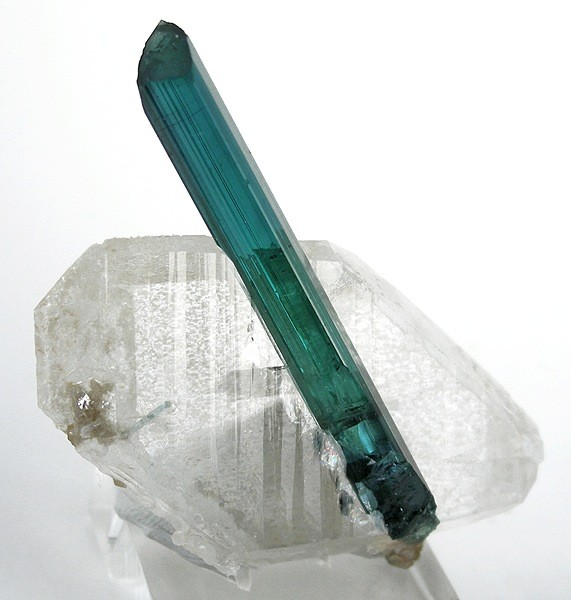
Indicolite

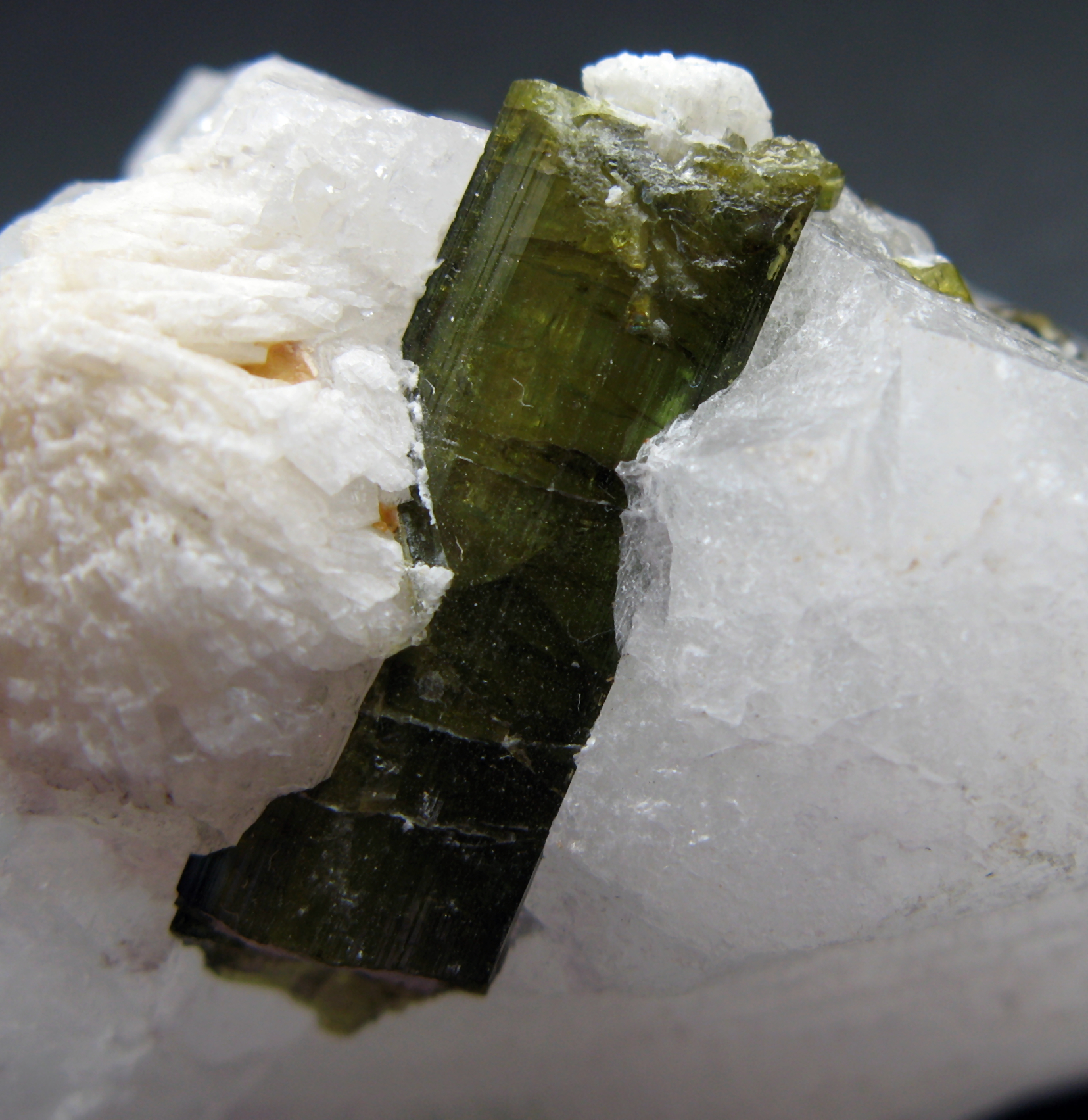
Verdelite

Watermelon tourmaline (elbaite)

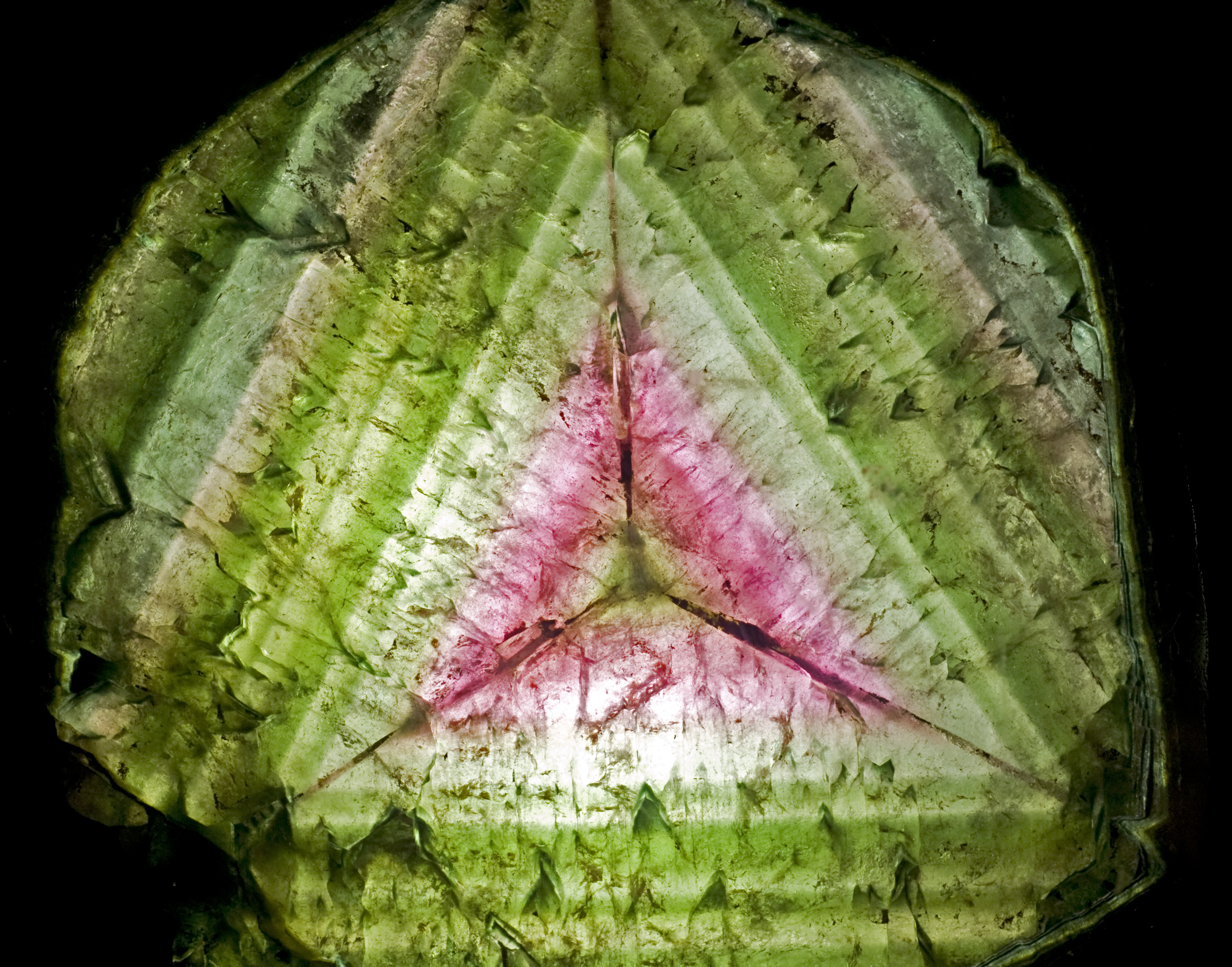
Another example of watermelon tourmaline

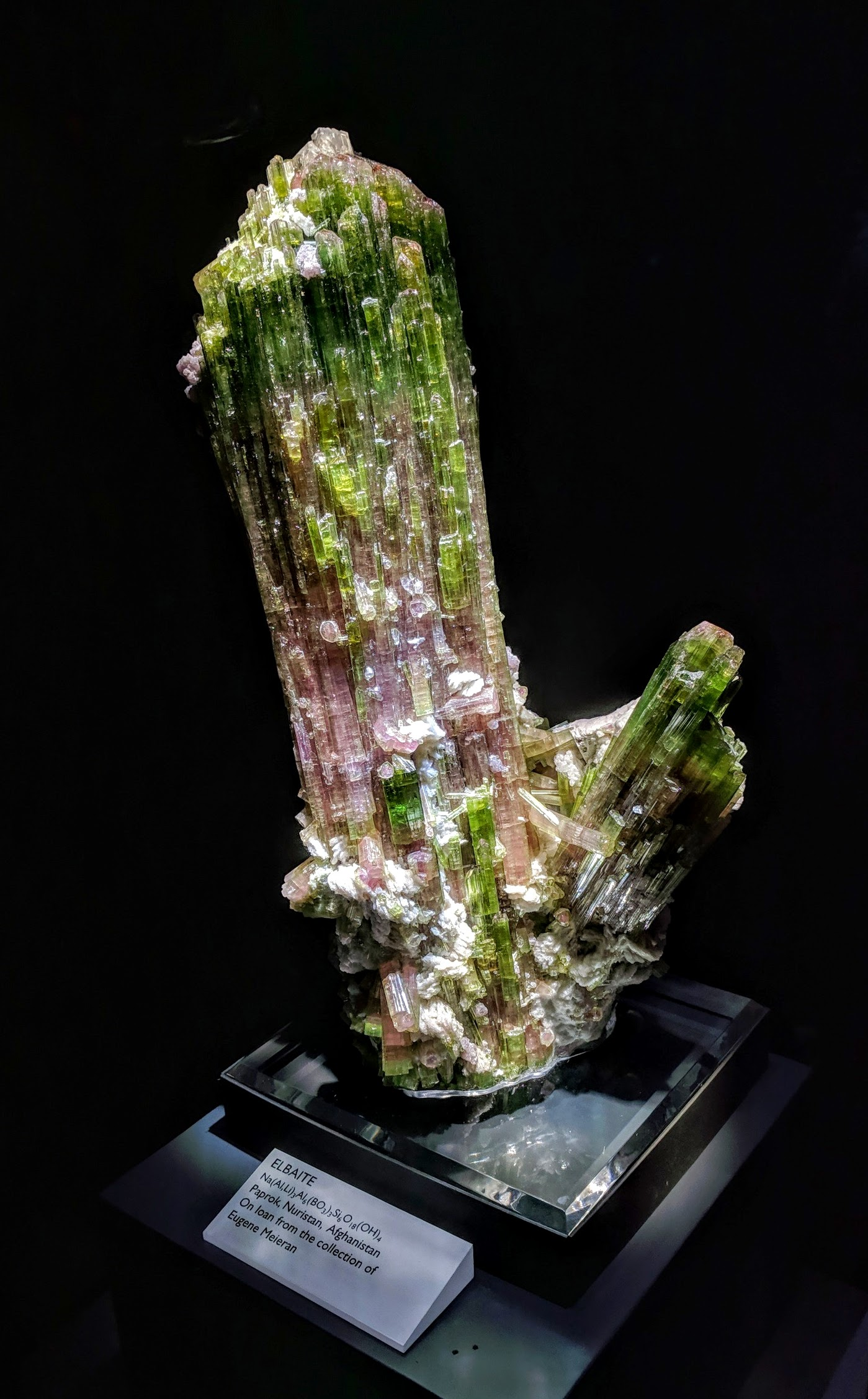
Elbaite specimen at Yale's Peabody Museum of Natural History

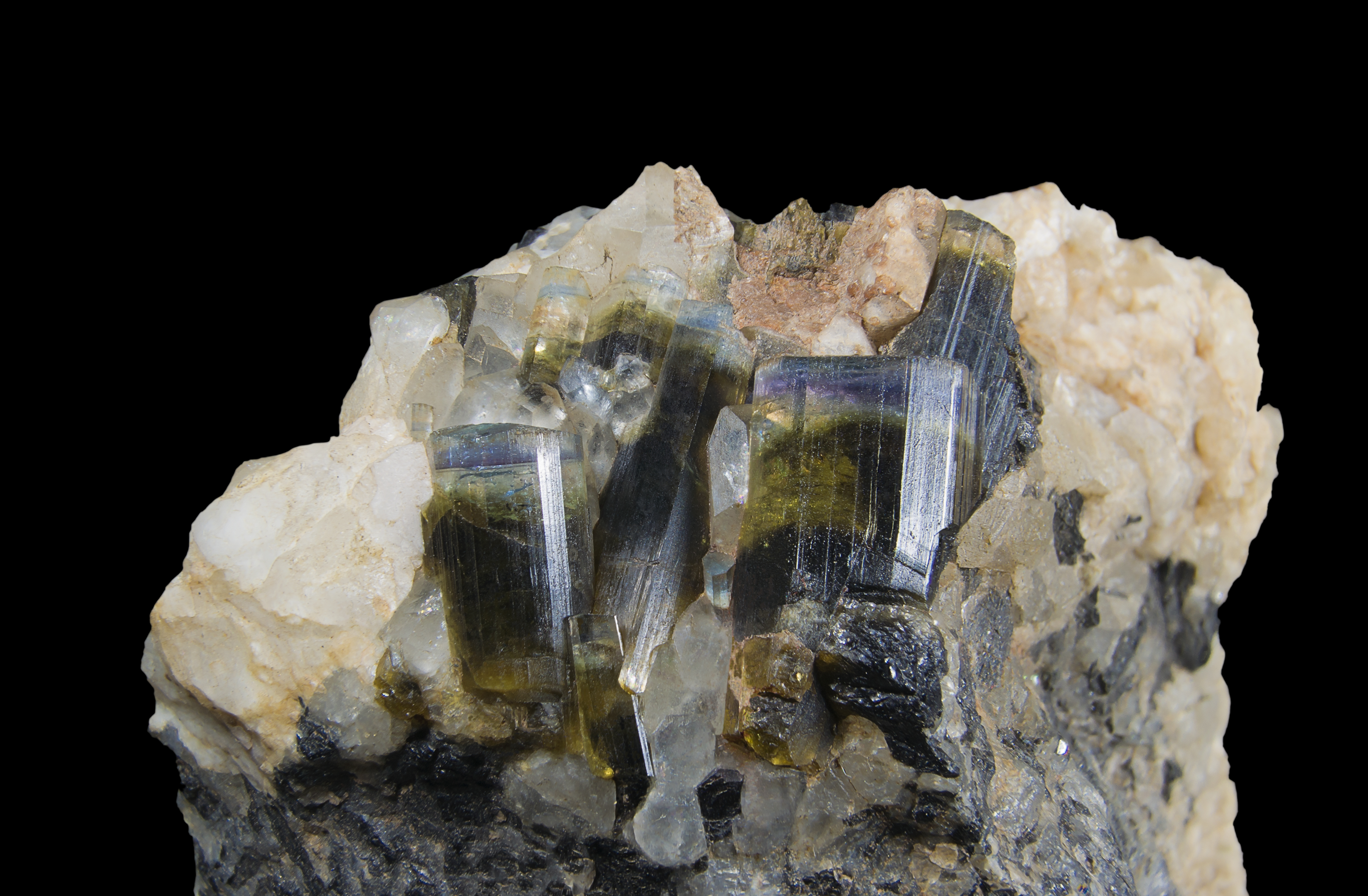
Elbaite specimen

== See also ==
- List of minerals
- Media related to Elbaite at Wikimedia Commons
