= Tourmaline =

Cyclosilicate mineral group

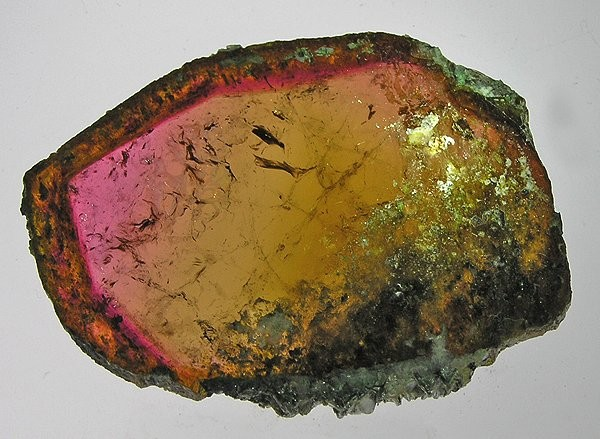

General
- Category: Cyclosilicate
- Formula: (Ca,K,Na, ▢)(Al,Fe,Li,Mg,Mn)_{3}(Al,Cr,Fe,V)_{6} (BO_{3})_{3}(Si,Al,B)_{6}O_{18}(OH,F)_{4}
- IMA symbol: Tur
- Crystal system: Trigonal
- Crystal class: Ditrigonal pyramidal (3m); H-M symbol: (3m)
- Space group: R3m (no. 160)

Identification
- Color: Most commonly black, but can range from colorless to brown, red, orange, yellow, green, blue, violet, pink, or hues in-between. It can also be bi-colored, or even tri-colored. Rarely, it can be found as neon green or electric blue.
- Crystal habit: Parallel and elongated; acicular prisms, sometimes radiating; massive; scattered grains (in granite)
- Cleavage: Indistinct
- Fracture: Uneven, small conchoidal
- Tenacity: Brittle
- Mohs scale hardness: 7.0–7.5
- Luster: Vitreous, sometimes resinous
- Streak: White
- Diaphaneity: Translucent to opaque
- Specific gravity: 3.06+0.20–0.06
- Density: 2.82–3.32
- Polish luster: Vitreous
- Optical properties: Double-refractive, uniaxial negative
- Refractive index: n_{ω} = 1.635–1.675 n_{ε} = 1.610–1.650
- Birefringence: −0.018 to −0.040; typically about −0.020 but in dark stones it may reach −0.040
- Pleochroism: Typically moderate to strong; Red: definite; dark red, light red; Green: strong; dark green, yellow-green; Brown: definite; dark brown, light brown; Blue: strong; dark blue, light blue
- Dispersion: 0.017
- Ultraviolet fluorescence: Pink stones; inert to very weak red to violet in long and short wave
- Absorption spectra: Strong narrow band at 498 nm, and almost complete absorption of red down to 640 nm in blue and green stones; red and pink stones show lines at 458 and 451 nm, as well as a broad band in the green spectrum

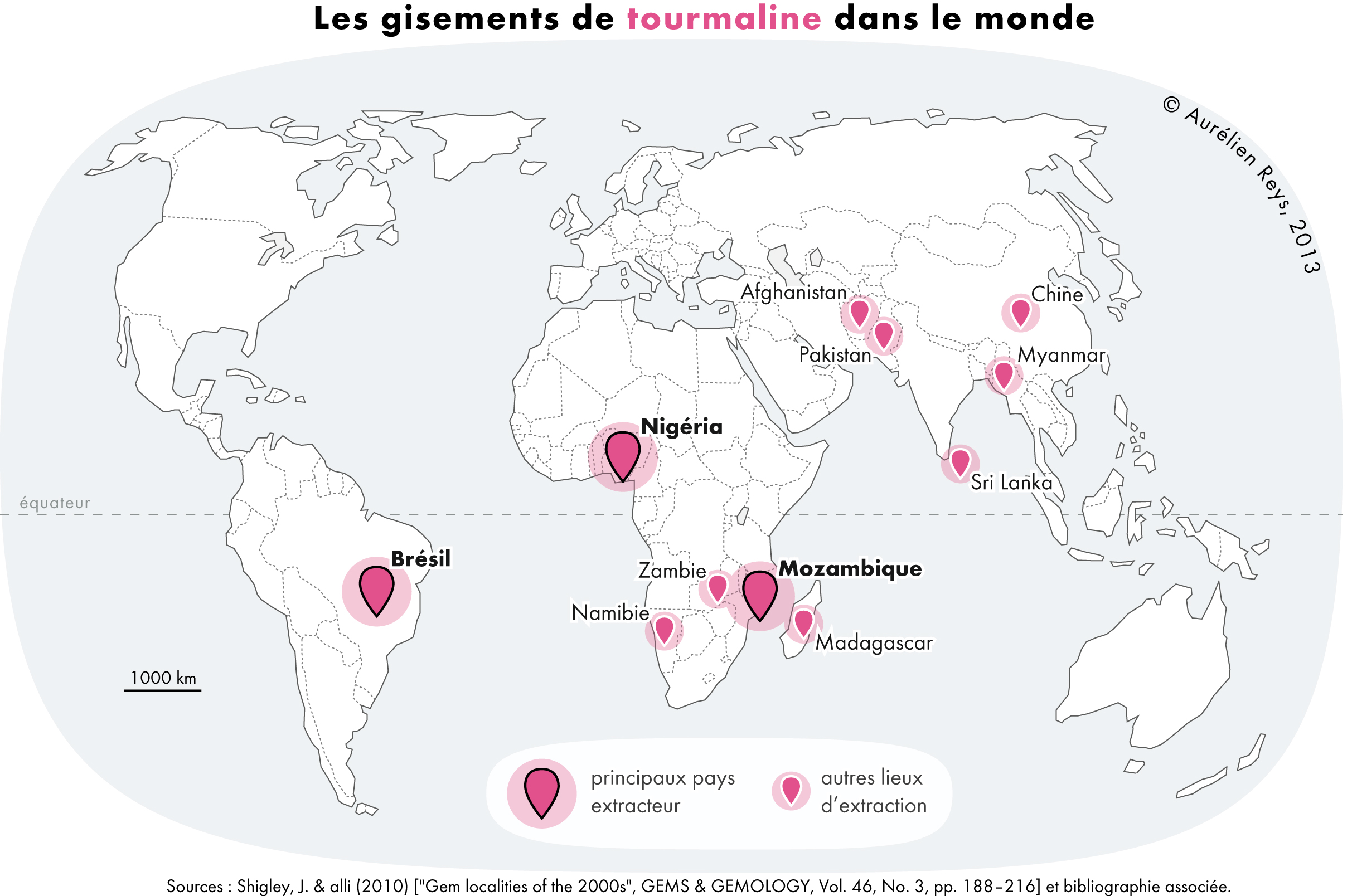
Main tourmaline producing countries

Tourmaline (/ˈtʊərməlɪn, -ˌliːn/ TOOR-mə-lin, -leen) is a crystalline silicate mineral group in which boron is compounded with elements such as aluminium, iron, magnesium, sodium, lithium, or potassium. This gemstone comes in a wide variety of colors.

The name is derived from the Sinhalese tōramalli (ටෝරමල්ලි), which refers to the carnelian gemstones.

== History ==
Tourmaline comes from the Sinhalese toramalli, a general name for carnelian.

Brightly colored Ceylonese gem tourmalines were brought to Europe in great quantities by the Dutch East India Company, to satisfy a demand for curiosities and gems. Tourmaline was sometimes called the "Ceylonese Magnet" because it could attract and then repel hot ashes due to its pyroelectric properties.

Tourmalines were used by chemists in the 19th century to polarize light by shining rays onto a cut and polished surface of the gem.

== Species and varieties ==
Commonly encountered species and varieties of tourmaline include the following:

- Schorl species
  - Brownish-black to black—schorl
- Dravite species (from the Drave district of Carinthia)
  - Dark yellow to brownish-black—dravite
- Elbaite species (named after the island of Elba, Italy)
  - Red or pinkish-red—rubellite variety
  - Light blue to bluish-green—indicolite variety (from indigo)
  - Green—verdelite variety
  - Colorless—achroite variety (from Ancient Greek άχρωμος (ákhrōmos) 'colorless')

=== Schorl ===
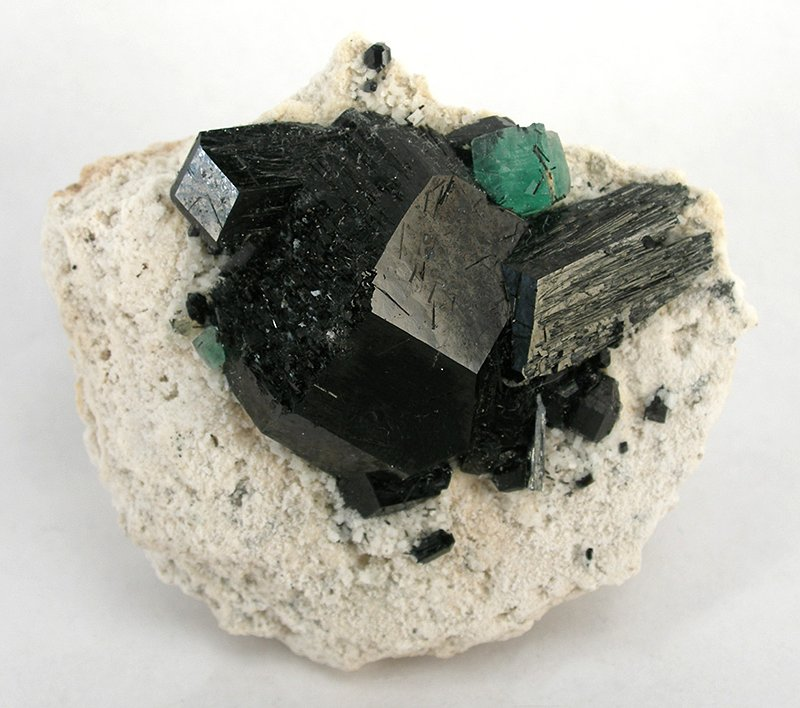
A single stark green fluorite isolated on top of schorl crystals

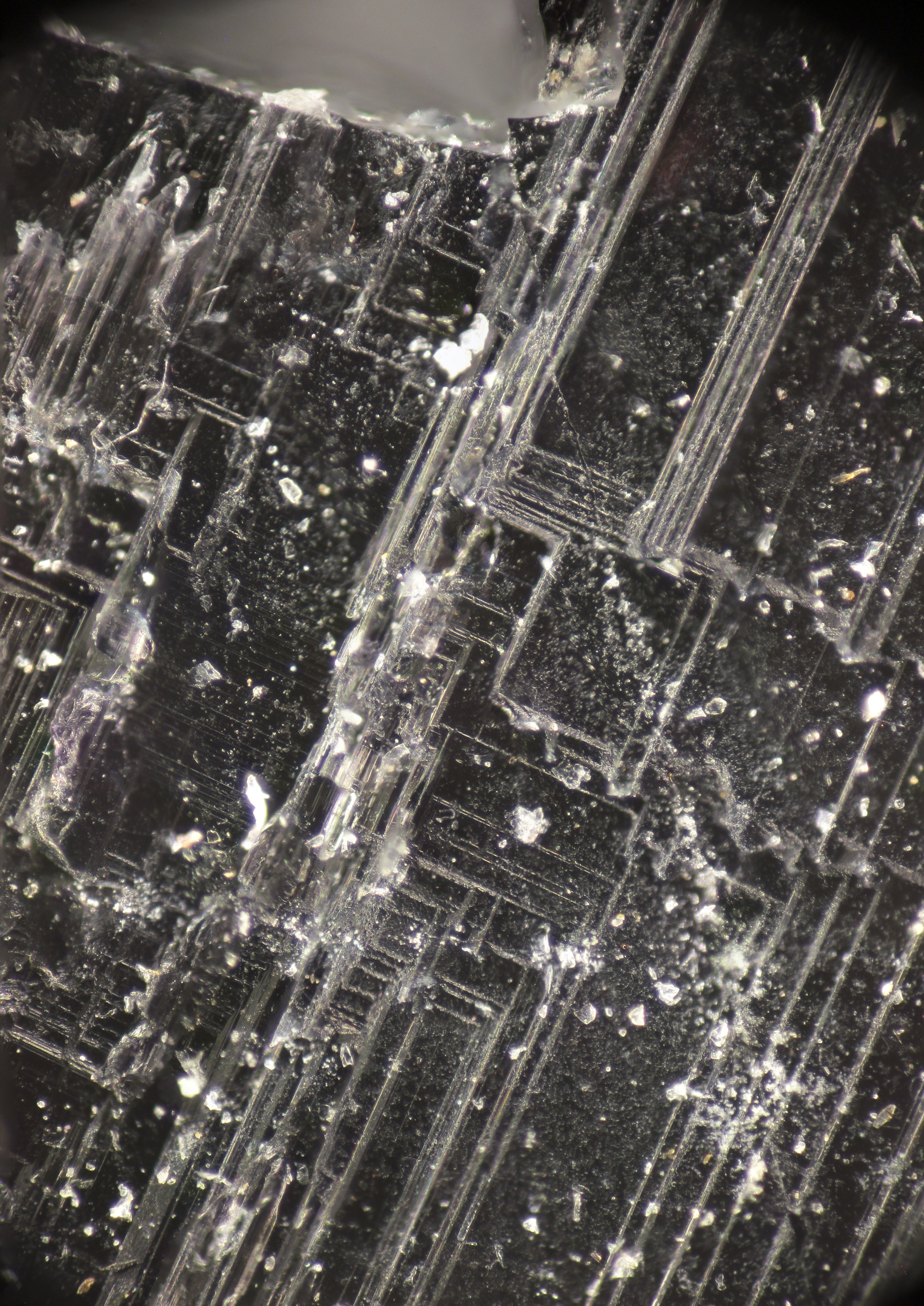
Schorl, magnified 10×

The most common species of tourmaline is schorl, the sodium iron (divalent) endmember of the group. It may account for 95% or more of all tourmaline in nature. The early history of the mineral schorl shows that the name "schorl" was in use prior to 1400 because a village known today as Zschorlau (in Saxony, Germany) was then named "Schorl" (or minor variants of this name), and the village had a nearby tin mine where, in addition to cassiterite, black tourmaline was found. The first description of schorl with the name "schürl" and its occurrence (various tin mines in the Ore Mountains) was written by Johannes Mathesius (1504–1565) in 1562 under the title "Sarepta oder Bergpostill". Up to about 1600, additional names used in the German language were "Schurel", "Schörle", and "Schurl". Beginning in the 18th century, the name Schörl was mainly used in the German-speaking area. In English, the names shorl and shirl were used in the 18th century. In the 19th century the names common schorl, schörl, schorl and iron tourmaline were the English words used for this mineral.

=== Dravite ===
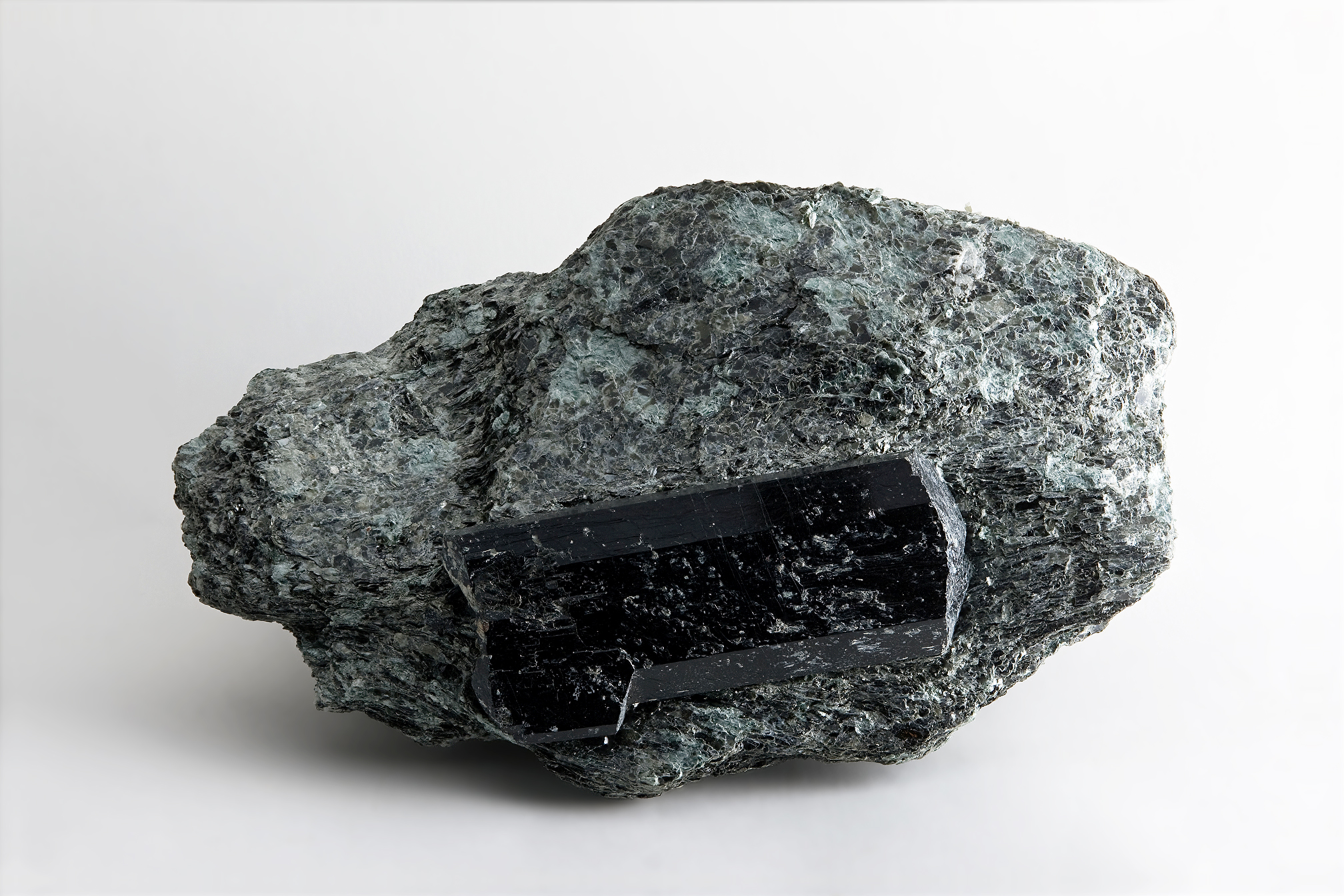
Black dravite on a grey matrix

Dravite, also called brown tourmaline, is the sodium magnesium rich tourmaline endmember. Uvite, in comparison, is a calcium magnesium tourmaline. Dravite forms multiple series, with other tourmaline members, including schorl and elbaite.

The name dravite was used for the first time by Gustav Tschermak (1836–1927), Professor of Mineralogy and Petrography at the University of Vienna, in his book Lehrbuch der Mineralogie (published in 1884) for magnesium-rich (and sodium-rich) tourmaline from village Dobrova near Unterdrauburg in the Drava river area, Carinthia, Austro-Hungarian Empire. Today this tourmaline locality (type locality for dravite) at Dobrova (near Dravograd), is a part of the Republic of Slovenia. Tschermak gave this tourmaline the name dravite, for the Drava river area, which is the district along the Drava River (in German: Drau, in Latin: Drave) in Austria and Slovenia. The chemical composition which was given by Tschermak in 1884 for this dravite approximately corresponds to the formula NaMg_{3}(Al,Mg)_{6}B_{3}Si_{6}O_{27}(OH), which is in good agreement (except for the OH content) with the endmember formula of dravite as known today.

Dravite varieties include the deep green chromium dravite and the vanadium dravite.

=== Elbaite ===
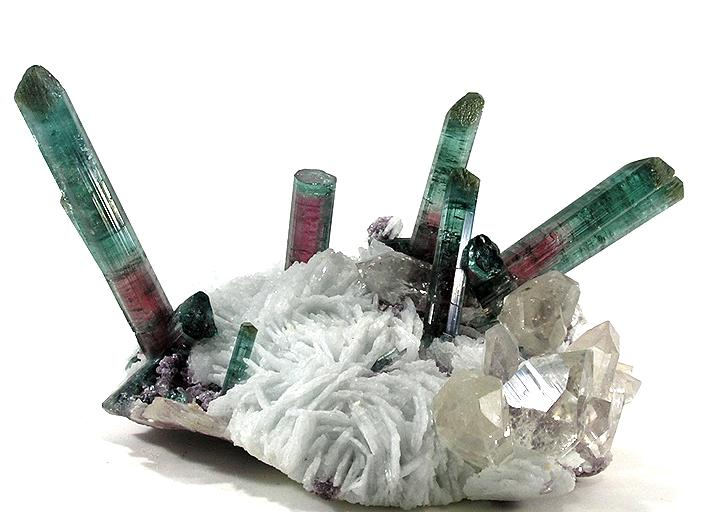
Elbaite with quartz and lepidolite on cleavelandite

A lithium-tourmaline elbaite was one of three pegmatitic minerals from Utö, Sweden, in which the new alkali element lithium (Li) was determined in 1818 by Johan August Arfwedson for the first time. Elba Island, Italy, was one of the first localities where colored and colorless Li-tourmalines were extensively chemically analysed. In 1850, Karl Friedrich August Rammelsberg described fluorine (F) in tourmaline for the first time. In 1870, he proved that all varieties of tourmaline contain chemically bound water. In 1889, Scharitzer proposed the substitution of (OH) by F in red Li-tourmaline from Sušice, Czech Republic. In 1914, Vladimir Vernadsky proposed the name Elbait for lithium-, sodium-, and aluminum-rich tourmaline from Elba Island, Italy, with the simplified formula (Li,Na)HAl_{6}B_{2}Si_{4}O_{21}. Most likely the type material for elbaite was found at Fonte del Prete, San Piero in Campo, Campo nell'Elba, Elba Island, Province of Livorno, Tuscany, Italy. In 1933 Winchell published an updated formula for elbaite, H_{8}Na_{2}Li_{3}Al_{3}B_{6}Al_{12}Si_{12}O_{62}, which is commonly used to date written as Na(Li_{1.5}Al_{1.5})Al_{6}(BO_{3})_{3}[Si_{6}O_{18}](OH)_{3}(OH). The first crystal structure determination of a Li-rich tourmaline was published in 1972 by Donnay and Barton, performed on a pink elbaite from San Diego County, California, United States.

== Chemical composition ==
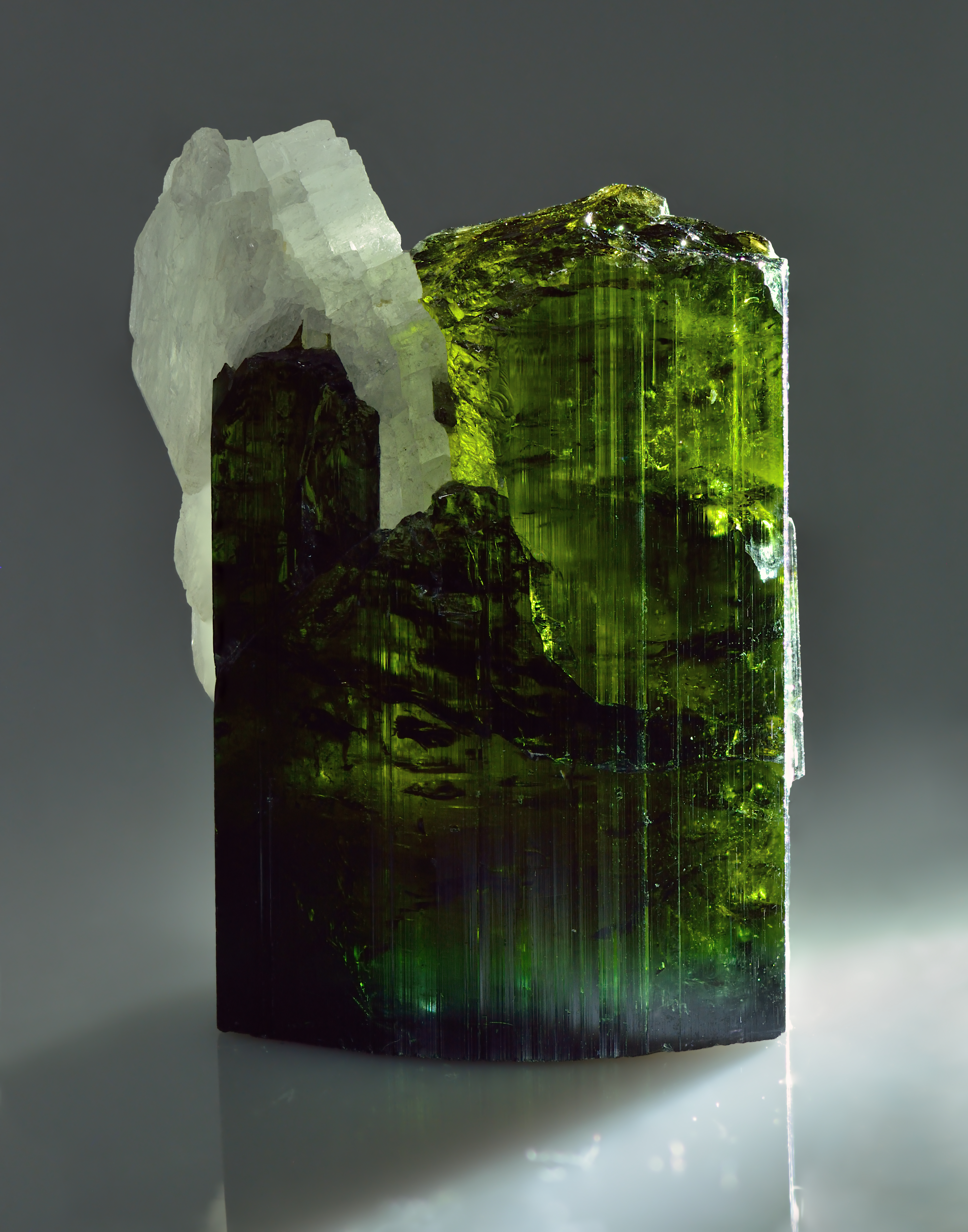
Elbaite

The tourmaline mineral group is chemically one of the most complicated groups of silicate minerals. Its composition varies widely because of isomorphous replacement (solid solution), and its general formula can be written as XY_{3}Z_{6}(T_{6}O_{18})(BO_{3})_{3}V_{3}W, where:

- X = Ca, Na, K, ▢ = vacancy
- Y = Li, Mg, Fe^{2+}, Mn^{2+}, Zn, Al, Cr^{3+}, V^{3+}, Fe^{3+}, Ti^{4+}, ▢ = vacancy
- Z = Mg, Al, Fe^{3+}, Cr^{3+}, V^{3+}
- T = Si, Al, B
- B = B, ▢ = vacancy
- V = OH, O
- W = OH, F, O

The 42 minerals in the group (endmember formulas) recognized by the International Mineralogical Association
Species Name	Ideal Endmember Formula	IMA Number	Symbol
Adachiite	CaFe^{2+}_{3}Al_{6}(Si_{5}AlO_{18})(BO_{3})_{3}(OH)_{3}OH	2012-101	Adc
Alumino-oxy-rossmanite	▢Al_{3}Al_{6}(Si_{5}AlO_{18})(BO_{3})_{3}(OH)_{3}O	2020-008	Aorsm
Bosiite	NaFe^{3+}_{3}(Al_{4}Mg_{2})Si_{6}O_{18}(BO_{3})_{3}(OH)_{3}O	2014-094	Bos
Celleriite	▢(Mn^{2+}_{2}Al)Al_{6}(Si_{6}O_{18})(BO_{3})_{3}(OH)_{3}(OH)	2019-089	Cll
Chromium-dravite	NaMg_{3}Cr_{6}Si_{6}O_{18}(BO_{3})_{3}(OH)_{3}OH	1982-055	Cdrv
Chromo-alumino-povondraite	NaCr_{3}(Al_{4}Mg_{2})Si_{6}O_{18}(BO_{3})_{3}(OH)_{3}O	2013-089	Capov
Darrellhenryite	NaLiAl_{2}Al_{6}Si_{6}O_{18}(BO_{3})_{3}(OH)_{3}O	2012-026	Dhry
Dravite	NaMg_{3}Al_{6}Si_{6}O_{18}(BO_{3})_{3}(OH)_{3}OH	1884 -	Drv
Dutrowite	Na(Fe_{2.5}Ti_{0.5})Al_{6}Si_{6}O_{18}(BO_{3})_{3}(OH)_{3}O	2019-082	Dtw
Elbaite	Na(Li_{1.5},Al_{1.5})Al_{6}Si_{6}O_{18}(BO_{3})_{3}(OH)_{3}OH	1913 -	Elb
Ertlite	NaAl_{3}Al_{6}(Si_{4}B_{2}O_{18})(BO_{3})_{3}(OH)_{3}O	2023-086	Etl
Ferro-bosiite	NaFe^{3+}_{3}(Al_{4}Fe^{2+}_{2})Si_{6}O_{18}(BO_{3})_{3}(OH)_{3}O	2022-069	Fbos
Feruvite	CaFe^{2+}_{3}(MgAl_{5})Si_{6}O_{18}(BO_{3})_{3}(OH)_{3}OH	1987-057	Fer
Fluor-buergerite	NaFe^{3+}_{3}Al_{6}Si_{6}O_{18}(BO_{3})_{3}O_{3}F	1965-005	Fbu
Fluor-dravite	NaMg_{3}Al_{6}Si_{6}O_{18}(BO_{3})_{3}(OH)_{3}F	2009-089	Fdrv
Fluor-elbaite	Na(Li_{1.5},Al_{1.5})Al_{6}Si_{6}O_{18}(BO_{3})_{3}(OH)_{3}F	2011-071	Felb
Fluor-liddicoatite	Ca(Li_{2},Al)Al_{6}Si_{6}O_{18}(BO_{3})_{3}(OH)_{3}F	1976-041 (Note: Named 'liddicoatite' in 1976; renamed to fluor-liddicoatite by the IMA in 2011)	Fld
Fluor-rossmanite	▢(LiAl_{2})Al_{6}Si_{6}O_{18}(BO_{3})_{3}(OH)_{3}F	2023-111	Frsm
Fluor-schorl	NaFe^{2+}_{3}Al_{6}Si_{6}O_{18}(BO_{3})_{3}(OH)_{3}F	2010-067	Fsrl
Fluor-tsilaisite	NaMn^{2+}_{3}Al_{6}Si_{6}O_{18}(BO_{3})_{3}(OH)_{3}F	2012-044	Ftl
Fluor-uvite	CaMg_{3}(Al_{5}Mg)Si_{6}O_{18}(BO_{3})_{3}(OH)_{3}F	1930 -	Fluvt
Foitite	▢(Fe^{2+}_{2}Al)Al_{6}Si_{6}O_{18}(BO_{3})_{3}(OH)_{3}OH	1992-034	Foi
Liddicoatite	Ca(Li_{2},Al)Al_{6}Si_{6}O_{18}(BO_{3})_{3}(OH)_{3}(OH)	2025-047	Ld
Lucchesiite	Ca(Fe^{2+})_{3}Al_{6}Si_{6}O_{18}(BO_{3})_{3}(OH)_{3}O	2015-043	Lcc
Magnesio-dutrowite	Na(Mg_{2.5}Ti_{0.5})Al_{6}Si_{6}O_{18}(BO_{3})_{3}(OH)_{3}O	2023-015	Mdtw
Magnesio-foitite	▢(Mg_{2}Al)Al_{6}Si_{6}O_{18}(BO_{3})_{3}(OH)_{3}OH	1998-037	Mfoi
Magnesio-lucchesite	Ca(Mg_{3}Al_{6}Si_{6}O_{18}(BO_{3})_{3}(OH)_{3}O	2019-025	Mlcc
Maruyamaite	K(MgAl_{2})(Al_{5}Mg)Si_{6}O_{18}(BO_{3})_{3}(OH)_{3}O	2013-123	Mry
Olenite	NaAl_{3}Al_{6}Si_{6}O_{18}(BO_{3})_{3}O_{3}OH	1985-006	Ole
Oxy-chromium-dravite	NaCr_{3}(Mg_{2}Cr_{4})Si_{6}O_{18}(BO_{3})_{3}(OH)_{3}O	2011-097	Ocdrv
Oxy-dravite	Na(Al_{2}Mg)(Al_{5}Mg)Si_{6}O_{18}(BO_{3})_{3}(OH)_{3}O	2012-004	Odrv
Oxy-foitite	▢(Fe^{2+}Al_{2})Al_{6}Si_{6}O_{18}(BO_{3})_{3}(OH)_{3}O	2016-069	Ofoi
Oxy-schorl	Na(Fe^{2+}_{2}Al)Al_{6}Si_{6}O_{18}(BO_{3})_{3}(OH)_{3}O	2011-011	Osrl
Oxy-vanadium-dravite	NaV_{3}(V_{4}Mg_{2})Si_{6}O_{18}(BO_{3})_{3}(OH)_{3}O	1999-050	Ovdrv
Povondraite	NaFe^{3+}_{3}(Fe^{3+}_{4}Mg_{2})Si_{6}O_{18}(BO_{3})_{3}(OH)_{3}O	1979 (Note: Named 'ferridravite' in 1979; renamed to povondraite by the IMA in 1990)	Pov
Princivalleite	Na(Mn_{2}Al)Al_{6}Si_{6}O_{18}(BO_{3})_{3}(OH)_{3}O	2020-056	Pva
Rossmanite	▢(LiAl_{2})Al_{6}Si_{6}O_{18}(BO_{3})_{3}(OH)_{3}OH	1996-018	Rsm
Schorl	NaFe^{2+}_{3}Al_{6}Si_{6}O_{18}(BO_{3})_{3}(OH)_{3}OH	1505 -	Srl
Tsilaisite	NaMn^{2+}_{3}Al_{6}Si_{6}O_{18}(BO_{3})_{3}(OH)_{3}OH	2011-047	Tsl
Uvite	CaMg_{3}(Al_{5}Mg)Si_{6}O_{18}(BO_{3})_{3}(OH)_{3}OH	2000-030	Uvt
Vanadio-oxy-chromium-dravite	NaV_{3}(Cr_{4}Mg_{2})Si_{6}O_{18}(BO_{3})_{3}(OH)_{3}O	2012-034	Vocdrv
Vanadio-oxy-dravite	NaV_{3}(Al_{4}Mg_{2})Si_{6}O_{18}(BO_{3})_{3}(OH)_{3}O	2012-074	Vodrv

Mineral species that were named before the IMA was founded in 1958 do not have an IMA number.

The IMA commission on new mineral names published a list of approved symbols for each mineral species in 2021.

A revised nomenclature for the tourmaline group was published in 2011.

== Physical properties ==
=== Crystal structure ===
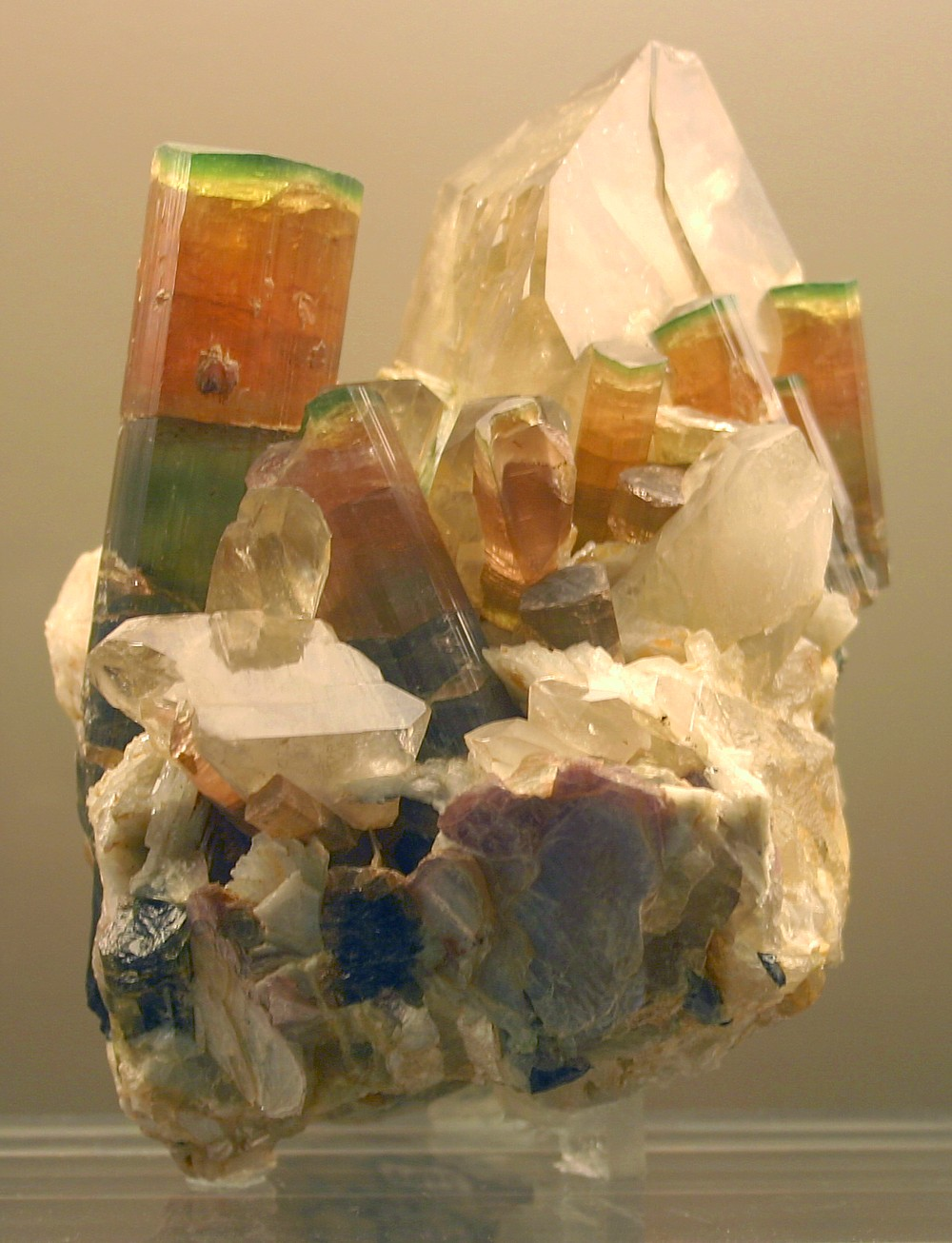
Tri-chromatic elbaite crystals on quartz, Himalaya Mine, San Diego Co., California, US

Tourmaline is a six-member ring cyclosilicate having a trigonal crystal system. It occurs as long, slender to thick prismatic and columnar crystals that are usually triangular in cross-section, often with curved striated faces. The style of termination at the ends of crystals is sometimes asymmetrical, called hemimorphism. Small slender prismatic crystals are common in a fine-grained granite called aplite, often forming radial daisy-like patterns. Tourmaline is distinguished by its three-sided prisms; no other common mineral has three sides. Prisms faces often have heavy vertical striations that produce a rounded triangular effect. Tourmaline is rarely perfectly euhedral. An exception was the fine dravite tourmalines of Yinnietharra, in western Australia. The deposit was discovered in the 1970s, but is now exhausted. All hemimorphic crystals are piezoelectric, and are often pyroelectric as well.

A crystal of tourmaline is built up of units consisting of a six-member silica ring that binds above to a large cation, such as sodium. The ring binds below to a layer of metal ions and hydroxyls or halogens, which structurally resembles a fragment of kaolin. This in turn binds to three triangular borate ions. Units joined end to end form columns running the length of the crystal. Each column binds with two other columns offset one-third and two-thirds of the vertical length of a single unit to form bundles of three columns. Bundles are packed together to form the final crystal structure. Because the neighboring columns are offset, the basic structural unit is not a unit cell: The actual unit cell of this structure includes portions of several units belonging to adjacent columns.

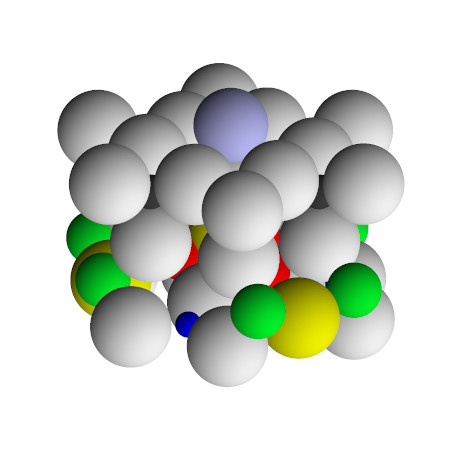
Oblique view of a single unit of the tourmaline crystal structure.

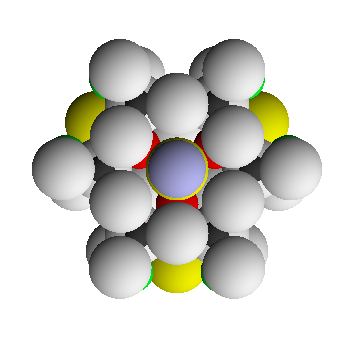
View of single unit of tourmaline structure along the axis of the crystal

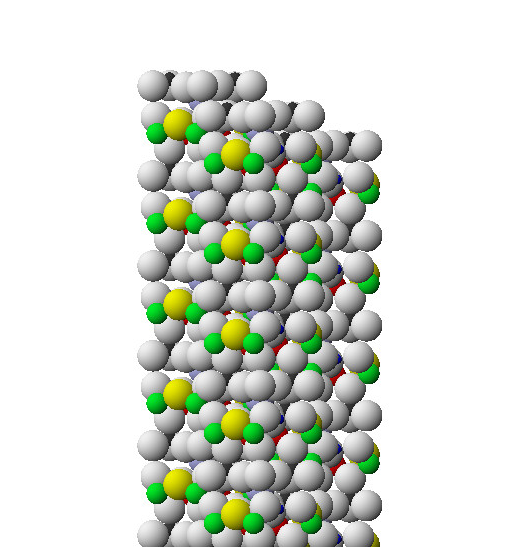
View along a axis of three columns of tourmaline units forming a bundle

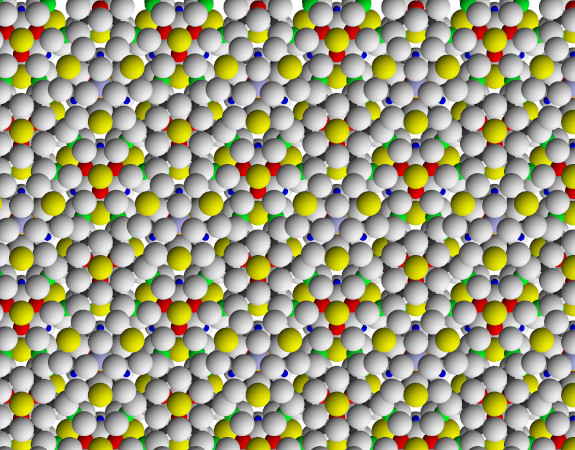
Structure of a tourmaline crystal viewed looking along the c axis of the crystal

=== Color ===
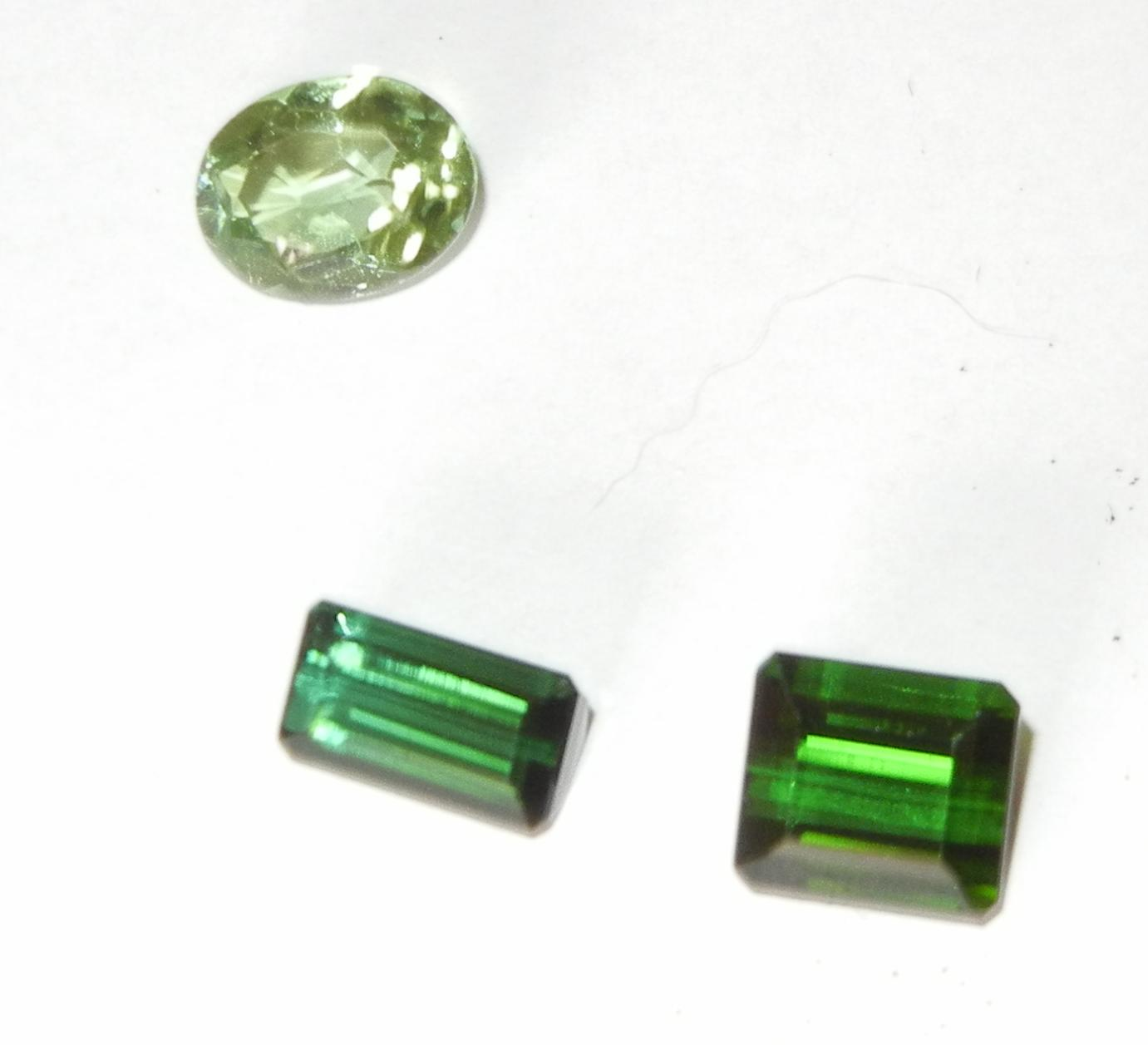
Two dark-green rectangular tourmaline stones and one oval tourmaline stone

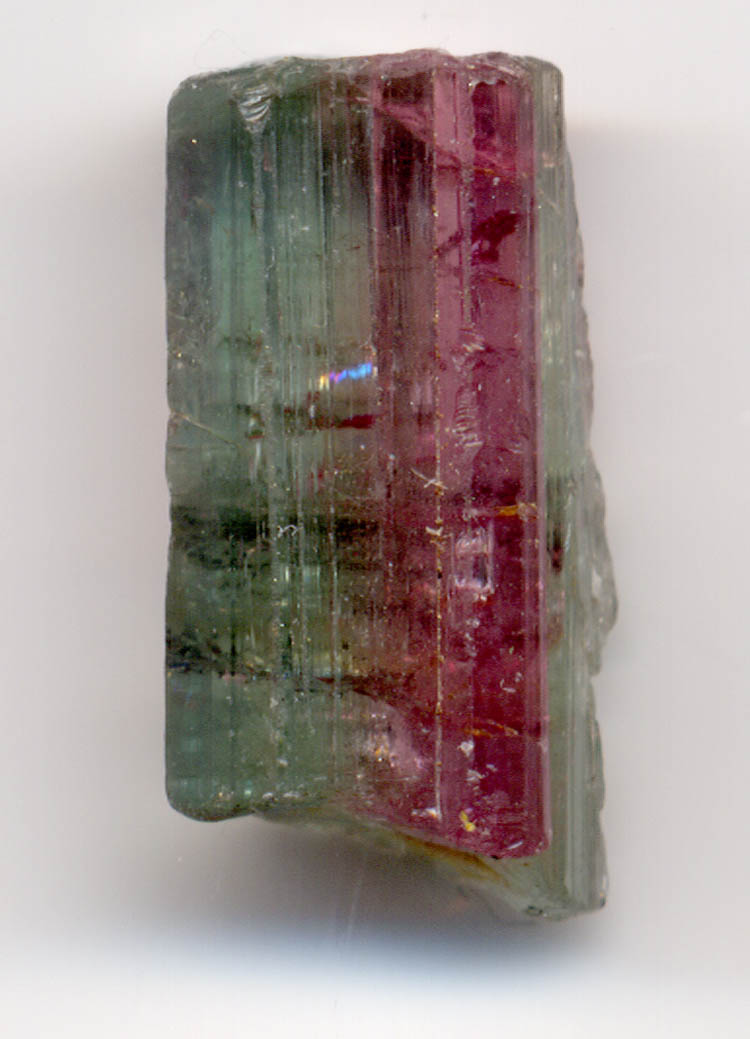
Bi-chromatic tourmaline crystal, 0.8 inches (2 cm) long

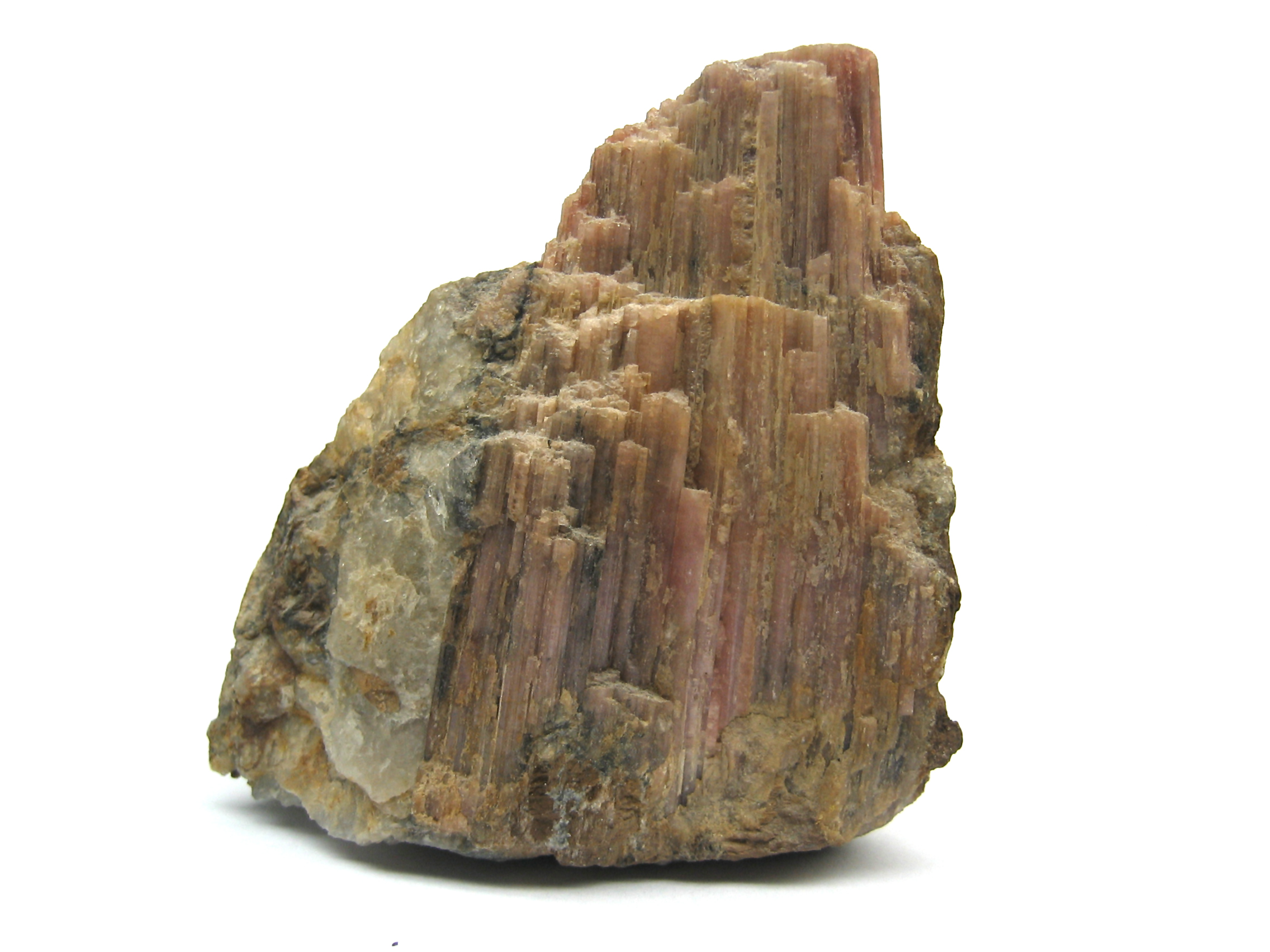
Tourmaline mineral, approximately 10 cm (3.9 in) tall

Tourmaline has a variety of colors.Red,Vermilion color,Orange,Amber (color),Yellow,Chartreuse colour,Green,Spring green,Cyan,Teal,Azure,Blue,Violet,Purple,Magenta,Rose color,Pink,Brown,Black,Gray,White.Iron-rich tourmalines are usually black to bluish-black to deep brown, while magnesium-rich varieties are brown to yellow, and lithium-rich tourmalines are almost any color: blue, green, red, yellow, pink, etc. Rarely, it is colorless. Bi-colored and multicolored crystals are common, reflecting variations of fluid chemistry during crystallization. Crystals may be green at one end and pink at the other, or green on the outside and pink inside; this type is called watermelon tourmaline and is prized in jewelry. An excellent example of watermelon tourmaline jewelry is a brooch piece (1969, gold, watermelon tourmaline, diamonds) by Andrew Grima (British, b. Italy, 1921–2007), in the collection of Kimberly Klosterman and on display at the Cincinnati Art Museum. Some forms of tourmaline are dichroic; they change color when viewed from different directions.

The pink color of tourmalines from many localities is the result of prolonged natural irradiation. During their growth, these tourmaline crystals incorporated Mn^{2+} and were initially very pale. Due to natural gamma ray exposure from radioactive decay of ^{40}K in their granitic environment, gradual formation of Mn^{3+} ions occurs, which is responsible for the deepening of the pink to red color.

=== Magnetism ===
Opaque black schorl and yellow tsilaisite are idiochromatic tourmaline species that have high magnetic susceptibilities due to high concentrations of iron and manganese respectively. Most gem-quality tourmalines are of the elbaite species. Elbaite tourmalines are allochromatic, deriving most of their color and magnetic susceptibility from schorl (which imparts iron) and tsilaisite (which imparts manganese).

Red and pink tourmalines have the lowest magnetic susceptibilities among the elbaites, while tourmalines with bright yellow, green and blue colors are the most magnetic elbaites. Dravite species such as green chromium dravite and brown dravite are diamagnetic. A handheld neodymium magnet can be used to identify or separate some types of tourmaline gems from others. For example, blue indicolite tourmaline is the only blue gemstone of any kind that will show a drag response when a neodymium magnet is applied. Any blue tourmaline that is diamagnetic can be identified as paraiba tourmaline colored by copper in contrast to magnetic blue tourmaline colored by iron.

=== Treatments ===
Some tourmaline gems, especially pink to red colored stones, are altered by heat treatment to improve their color. Overly dark red stones can be lightened by careful heat treatment. The pink color in manganese-containing near-colorless to pale pink stones can be greatly increased by irradiation with gamma-rays or electron beams. Irradiation is almost impossible to detect in tourmalines, and does not, currently, affect the value. Heavily included tourmalines, such as rubellite and Brazilian paraiba, are sometimes clarity-enhanced. A clarity-enhanced tourmaline (especially the paraiba variety) is worth much less than an untreated gem of equal clarity.

== Geology ==
Video of tourmaline ore

Tourmaline is found in granite and granite pegmatites and in metamorphic rocks such as schist and marble. Schorl and lithium-rich tourmalines are usually found in granite and granite pegmatite. Magnesium-rich tourmalines, dravites, are generally restricted to schists and marble. Tourmaline is a durable mineral and can be found in minor amounts as grains in sandstone and conglomerate, and is part of the ZTR index for highly weathered sediments.

== Localities ==
Gem and specimen tourmaline is mined chiefly in Brazil and many parts of Africa, including Tanzania, Nigeria, Kenya, Madagascar, Mozambique, Malawi, and Namibia. It is also mined in Asia, notably in Pakistan, Afghanistan, and Indonesia as well as in Sri Lanka and India, where some placer deposit material suitable for gem use is found.

=== United States ===
Some fine gems and specimen material have been produced in the United States, with the first discoveries in 1821, in the state of Maine.

==== Maine ====
Two college students were the first to discover tourmaline in Maine in 1821 on Mount Mica in Paris, Maine. In 1972, the Dunton Quarry on Plumbago Mountain in Newry was excavated and miners found what is known as "The Big Pocket" or "The Big Find" that contained two metric tons of tourmaline. The 1972 find revived gem mining in the state. The tourmaline discovered in 1972 included green, red and watermelon specimens. In 2022, the Maine Mineral & Gem Museum in Bethel opened the exhibition "The Big Find: The Legend Continues" which showcased stones from the 1972 find cut by 12 jewelers from across the country. Notable Maine tourmalines include a flawless 256-carat blue gem and a 69-carat gem purchased by Tiffany & Co. The Maine deposits tend to produce crystals in raspberry pink-red as well as minty greens.

==== California ====
The California deposits are known for bright pinks, as well as bicolors. California became a large producer of tourmaline in the early 1900s. During the early 1900s, Maine and California were the world's largest producers of gem tourmalines. The Empress Dowager Cixi of China loved pink tourmaline and bought large quantities for gemstones and carvings from the then new Himalaya Mine, located in San Diego County, California. It is not clear when the first tourmaline was found in California. Native Americans have used pink and green tourmaline as funeral gifts for centuries. The first documented case was in 1890 when Charles Russel Orcutt found pink tourmaline at what later became the Stewart Mine at Pala, California in San Diego County.

=== Brazil ===
Watermelon Tourmaline mineral on quartz matrix (crystal approximately 2 cm (0.79 in) wide at face)

Almost every color of tourmaline can be found in Brazil, especially in Minas Gerais and Bahia. The new type of tourmaline, which soon became known as paraiba tourmaline, came in blue and green. Brazilian paraiba tourmaline usually contains abundant inclusions. Much of the paraiba tourmaline from Brazil does not actually come from Paraíba, but the neighboring state of Rio Grande do Norte. Material from Rio Grande do Norte is often somewhat less intense in color, but many fine gems are found there. It was determined that the element copper was important in the coloration of the stone.

A large bluish-green tourmaline from Paraiba, measuring 36.44 mm × 33.75 mm × 21.85 mm (1.43 in × 1.33 in × 0.86 in) and weighing 191.87 carats (1.3536 oz; 38.374 g), is the world's largest cut tourmaline. Owned by Billionaire Business Enterprises, it was presented in Montreal, Quebec, Canada, on 14 October 2009.

=== Africa ===
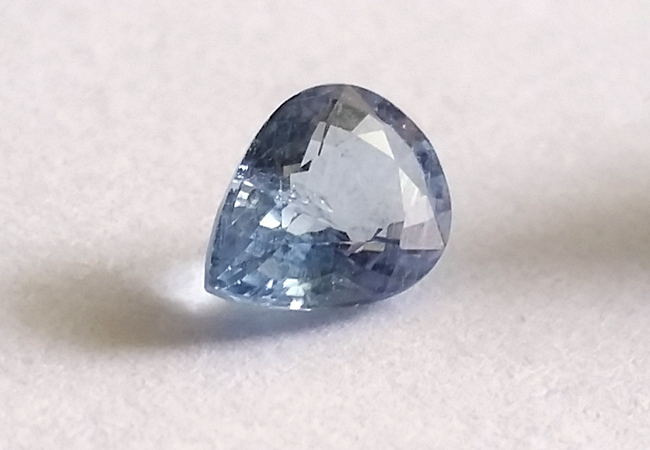
Paraiba tourmaline from Mozambique

In the late 1990s, copper-containing tourmaline was found in Nigeria. The material was generally paler and less saturated than the Brazilian materials, although the material generally was much less included. A more recent African discovery from Mozambique has also produced tourmaline colored by copper, similar to the Brazilian paraiba. The Mozambique paraiba material usually is more intensely colored than the Nigerian tourmaline, and Mozambique paraiba has similar colors to the Brazilian paraiba, but with relatively cheaper prices, better clarity, and larger sizes. In recent years the pricing of these beautiful gemstones has increased significantly.

Another highly valuable variety is chrome tourmaline, a rare type of dravite tourmaline from Tanzania. Chrome tourmaline is a rich green color due to the presence of chromium atoms in the crystal. Of the standard elbaite colors, blue indicolite gems are typically the most valuable, followed by green verdelite and pink to red rubellite.

In June 2026, the Swiss Gemmological Institute SSEF reported receiving credible information from trade and mining sources (Qolansa Minerals & Mining) indicating a new deposit of copper-bearing tourmaline had been discovered in Shakiso, Ethiopia, potentially representing a fourth African source of the gem.

== See also ==
- Benjamin Wilson – experimented with the electrical properties of tourmaline
