= ZTR index =

Weathering index for sediments and sedimentary rocks

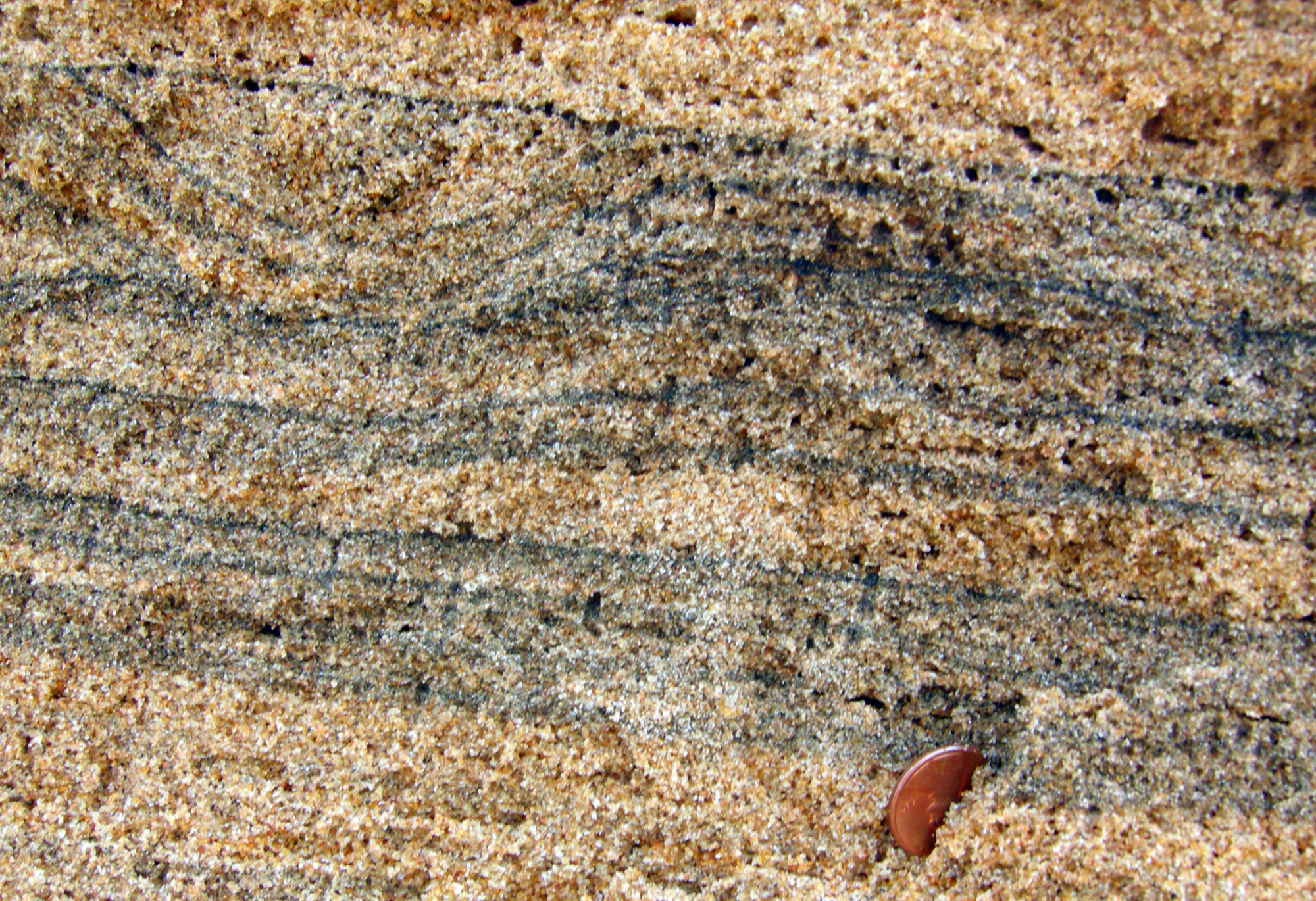
Heavy mineral concentrated in a beach sand near Chennai, India

The ZTR index is a method of determining how weathered, both chemically and mechanically, a sediment (or a corresponding sedimentary rock) is. The letters in ZTR stand for three common minerals found in ultra-weathered sediments: zircon, tourmaline, and rutile. Other minerals that can be used alongside the ZTR index are garnet, magnetite, sphene, and other minerals from local provenance sources. The ZTR index is commonly high in beach or littoral zone depositional environments due to the long transport distances from the source and the high energy of the environment. These minerals are found in abundance due to their high specific gravity and resistance to weathering.
