= Lục Yên, Lào Cai =

Lục Yên
- Commune
- Location within Vietnam
- Coordinates: 22°5′55″N 104°45′52″E
- Country: Vietnam
- Region: Northeast
- Province: Lào Cai

Area
  - Total: 5.82 sq mi (15.07 km^{2})

Population
  - Total: 8,229
- Time zone: UTC+7 (UTC + 7)

Lục Yên is a commune of Lào Cai Province, in the northeastern region of Vietnam.

On June 16, 2025, the Standing Committee of the National Assembly issued Resolution No. 1680/NQ-UBTVQH15 on the reorganization of commune-level administrative units in Lào Cai Province in 2025. Accordingly, Yên Thế Township, together with Minh Xuân Commune, Yên Thắng Commune, and Liễu Đô Commune, were merged to form a new commune named Lục Yên Commune.
