= Environmental scanning electron microscope =

Scanning electron microscope with a gaseous environment in the specimen chamber

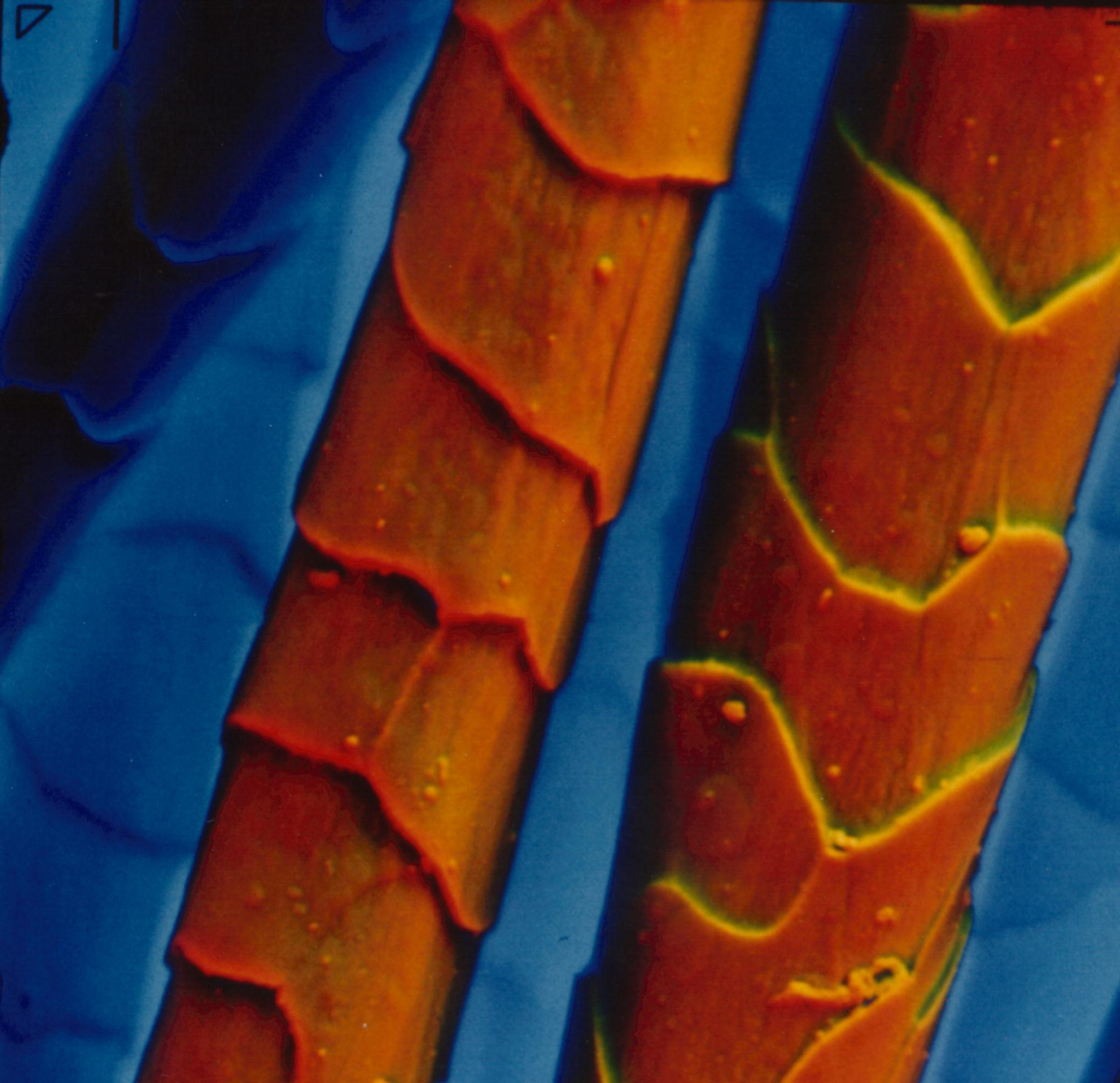
Wool fibers imaged in an ESEM by the use of two symmetrical plastic scintillating backscattered electron detectors. Pseudocolor.

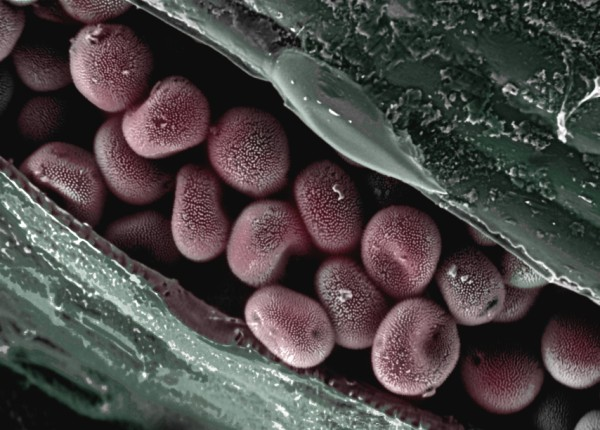
Fungal spores in lemon grass leaf, SE image, ElectroScan E3 ESEM

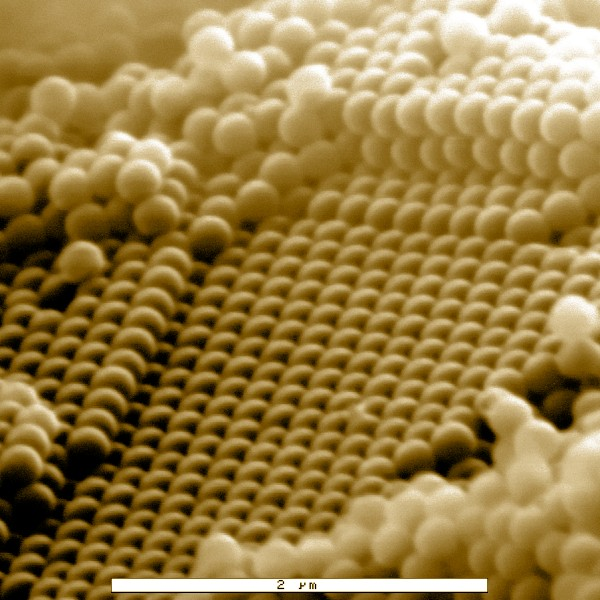
Piece of a crystallized polystyrene latex, SE image with ElectroScan 2020 ESEM

The environmental scanning electron microscope (ESEM) is a scanning electron microscope (SEM) that allows for the option of collecting electron micrographs of specimens that are wet, uncoated, or both by allowing for a gaseous environment in the specimen chamber. Although there were earlier successes at viewing wet specimens in internal chambers in modified SEMs, the ESEM with its specialized electron detectors (rather than the standard Everhart–Thornley detector) and its differential pumping systems, to allow for the transfer of the electron beam from the high vacuum in the gun area to the high pressure attainable in its specimen chamber, make it a versatile instrument for imaging specimens in their natural state. The instrument was designed originally by Gerasimos Danilatos while working at the University of New South Wales.

== History ==
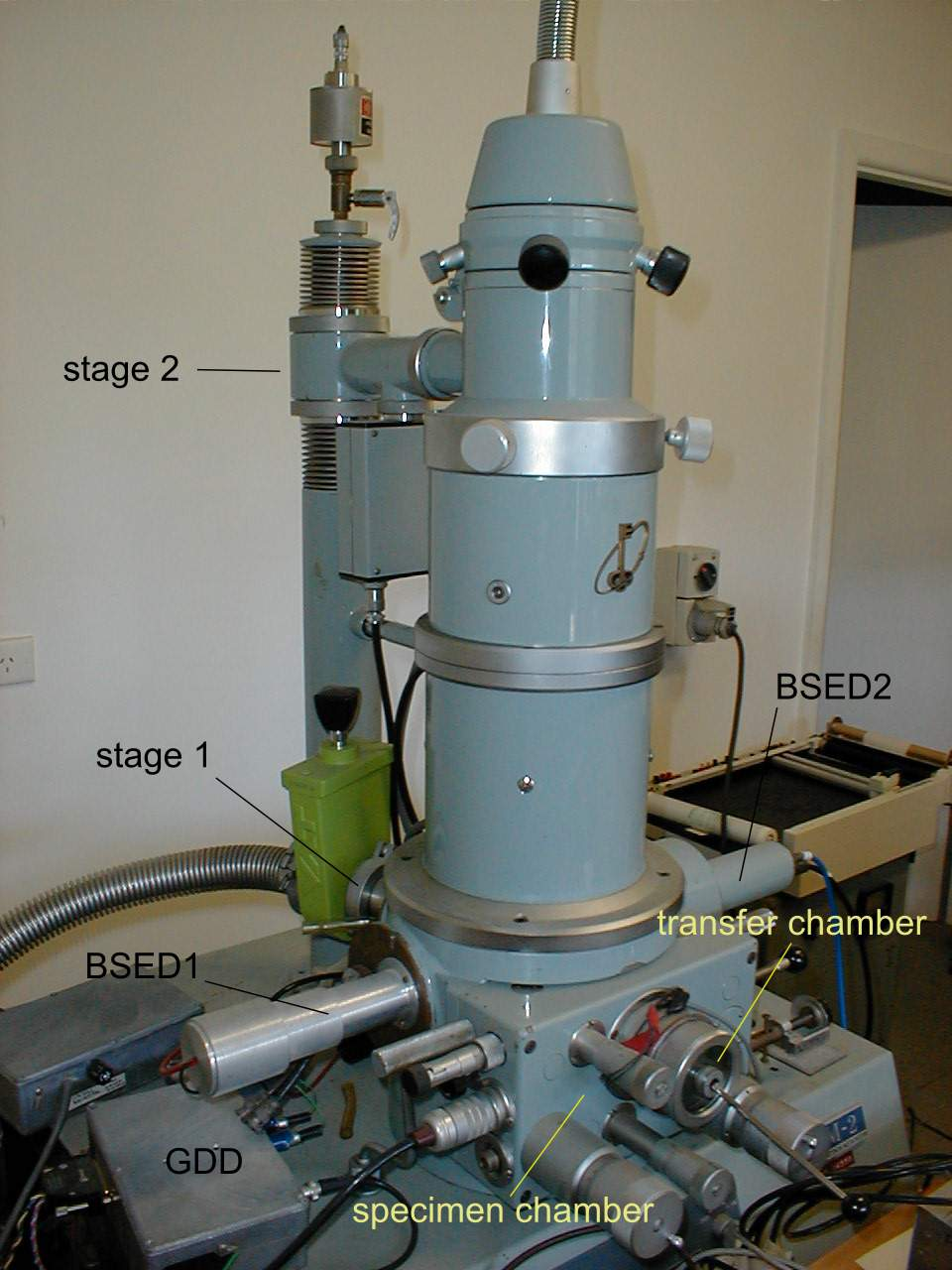
The world's first ESEM prototype

Starting with Manfred von Ardenne, early attempts were reported of the examination of specimens inside "environmental" cells with water or atmospheric gas, in conjunction with conventional and scanning transmission types of electron microscopes. However, the first images of wet specimens in an SEM were reported by Lane in 1970 when he injected a fine jet of water vapor over the point of observation at the specimen surface; the gas diffused away into the vacuum of the specimen chamber without any modification to the instrument. Shah and Beckett reported the use of differentially pumped cells or chambers to presumably maintain botanical specimens conductive in order to allow the use of the absorbed specimen current mode for signal detection in 1977 and in 1979. Spivak et al. reported the design and use of various environmental cell detection configurations in an SEM including differential pumping, or the use of electron transparent films to maintain the specimens in their wet state in 1977. Those cells, by their nature, had only limited application use and no further development was done. In 1974, an improved approach was reported by Robinson with the use of a backscattered electron detector and differential vacuum pumping with a single aperture and the introduction of water vapor around 600 Pa pressure at the freezing point of temperature. However, neither of those approaches produced a stable enough instrument for routine operation. Starting work with Robinson in 1978 at the University of New South Wales in Sydney, Danilatos undertook a thorough quantitative study and experimentation that resulted in a stable operation of the microscope at room temperature and high pressures up to 7000 Pa, as reported in 1979. In the following years, Danilatos, working independently, reported a series of works on the design and construction of an environmental or atmospheric scanning electron microscope (ASEM) capable of working at any pressure from vacuum up to one atmosphere. These early works involved the optimization of the differential pumping system together with backscattered electron (BSE) detectors until 1983, when he invented the use of the environmental gas itself as a detection medium. The decade of 1980 closed with the publication of two works dealing with the foundations of ESEM and the theory of the gaseous detection device (GDD). Furthermore, in 1988, the first commercial ESEM was exhibited in New Orleans by ElectroScan Corporation, a venture capital company wishing to commercialize the Danilatos ESEM. The company placed an emphasis on the secondary electron (SE) mode of the GDD and secured the monopoly of the commercial ESEM with a series of additional key patents. Philips and FEI companies succeeded ElectroScan in providing commercial ESEM instruments. With the expiration of key patents and assistance by Danilatos, new commercial instruments have been later added to the market by LEO (succeeded by Carl Zeiss SMT). Further improvements have been reported to date from work on the original experimental prototype ESEM in Sydney and from numerous other workers using the commercial ESEM in a wide variety of applications worldwide. An early bibliography was compiled in 1993 by Danilatos, whilst a more recent survey can be found in a Ph.D. Thesis by Morgan (2005).

== Microscope ==
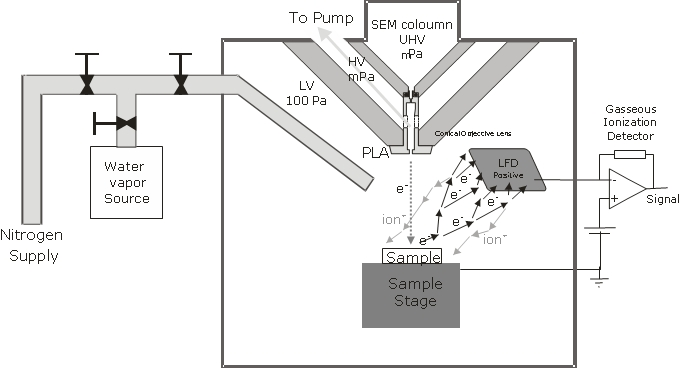
Schematic of an ESEM

An ESEM employs a scanned electron beam and electromagnetic lenses to focus and direct the beam on the specimen surface in an identical way as a conventional SEM. A very small focused electron spot (probe) is scanned in a raster form over a small specimen area. The beam electrons interact with the specimen surface layer and produce various signals (information) that are collected with appropriate detectors. The output of these detectors modulates, via appropriate electronics, the screen of a monitor to form an image that corresponds to the small raster and information, pixel by pixel, emanating from the specimen surface. Beyond these common principles, the ESEM deviates substantially from an SEM in several respects, all of which are important in the correct design and operation of the instrument. The outline below highlights these requirements and how the system works.

=== Differential pumping ===
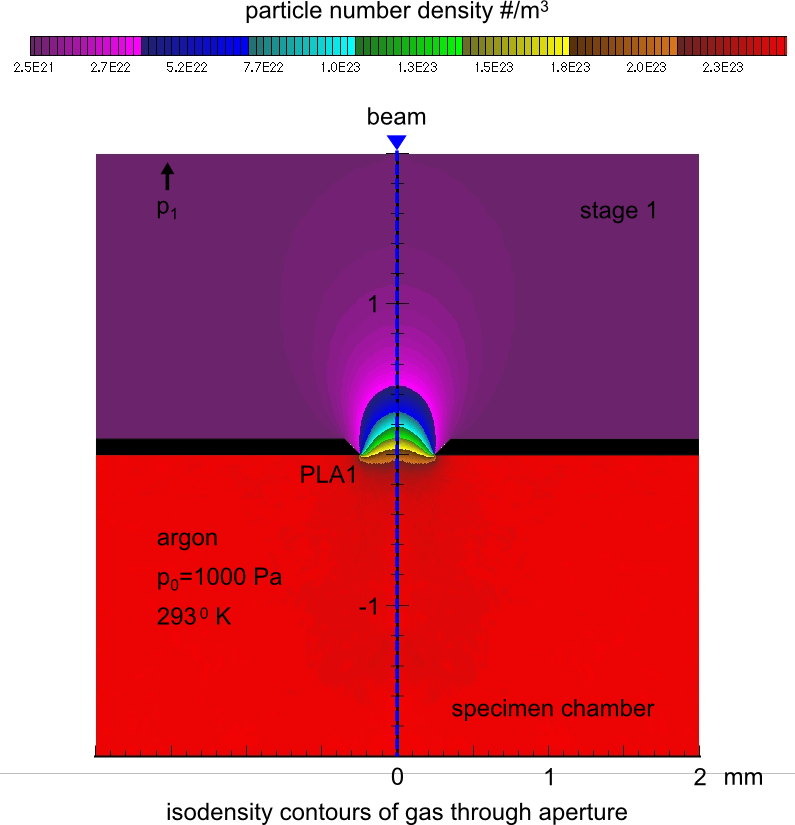
Isodensity contours of gas flowing through aperture

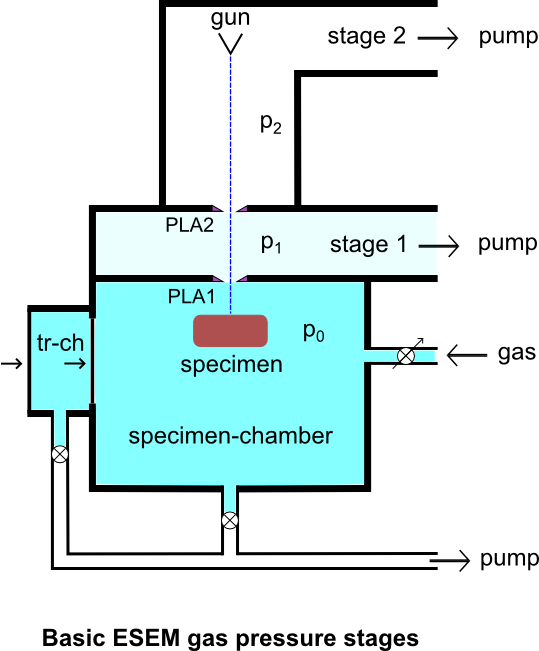
Basic ESEM gas pressure stages

The specimen chamber sustaining the high-pressure gaseous environment is separated from the high vacuum of the electron optics column with at least two small orifices customarily referred to as pressure-limiting apertures (PLA). The gas leaking through the first aperture (PLA1) is quickly removed from the system with a pump that maintains a much lower pressure in the downstream region (i.e. immediately above the aperture). This is called differential pumping. Some gas escapes further from the low pressure region (stage 1) through a second pressure limiting aperture (PLA2) into the vacuum region of the column above, which constitutes a second stage differential pumping (stage 2). A schematic diagram shows the basic ESEM gas pressure stages including the specimen chamber, intermediate cavity and upper electron optics column. The corresponding pressures achieved are p_{0}>>p_{1}>>p_{2}, which is a sufficient condition for a microscope employing a tungsten type of electron gun. Additional pumping stages may be added to achieve an even higher vacuum as required for a LaB_{6} and field emission type electron guns. The design and shape of a pressure limiting aperture are critical in obtaining the sharpest possible pressure gradient (transition) through it. This is achieved with an orifice made on a thin plate and tapered in the downstream direction as shown in the accompanying isodensity contours of a gas flowing through the PLA1. This was done with a computer simulation of the gas molecule collisions and movement through space in real time. We can immediately see in the figure of the isodensity contours of gas through aperture that the gas density decreases by about two orders of magnitude over the length of a few aperture radii. This is a quantitatively vivid demonstration of a first principle that enables the separation of the high-pressure specimen chamber from the low pressure and vacuum regions above.

By such means, the gas flow fields have been studied in a variety of instrument situations, in which subsequently the electron beam transfer has been quantified.

=== Electron beam transfer ===
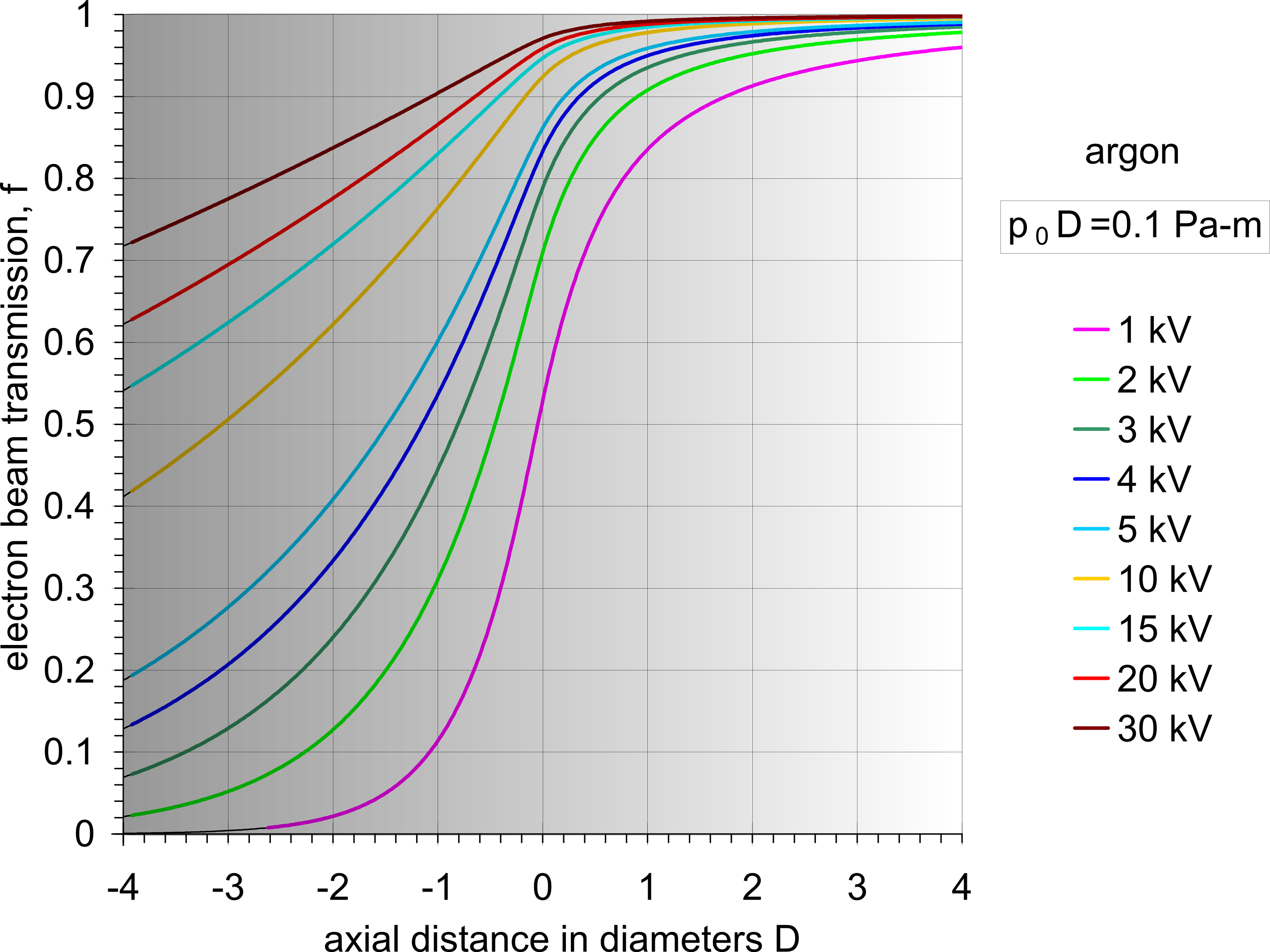
Beam transmission along PLA1 axis

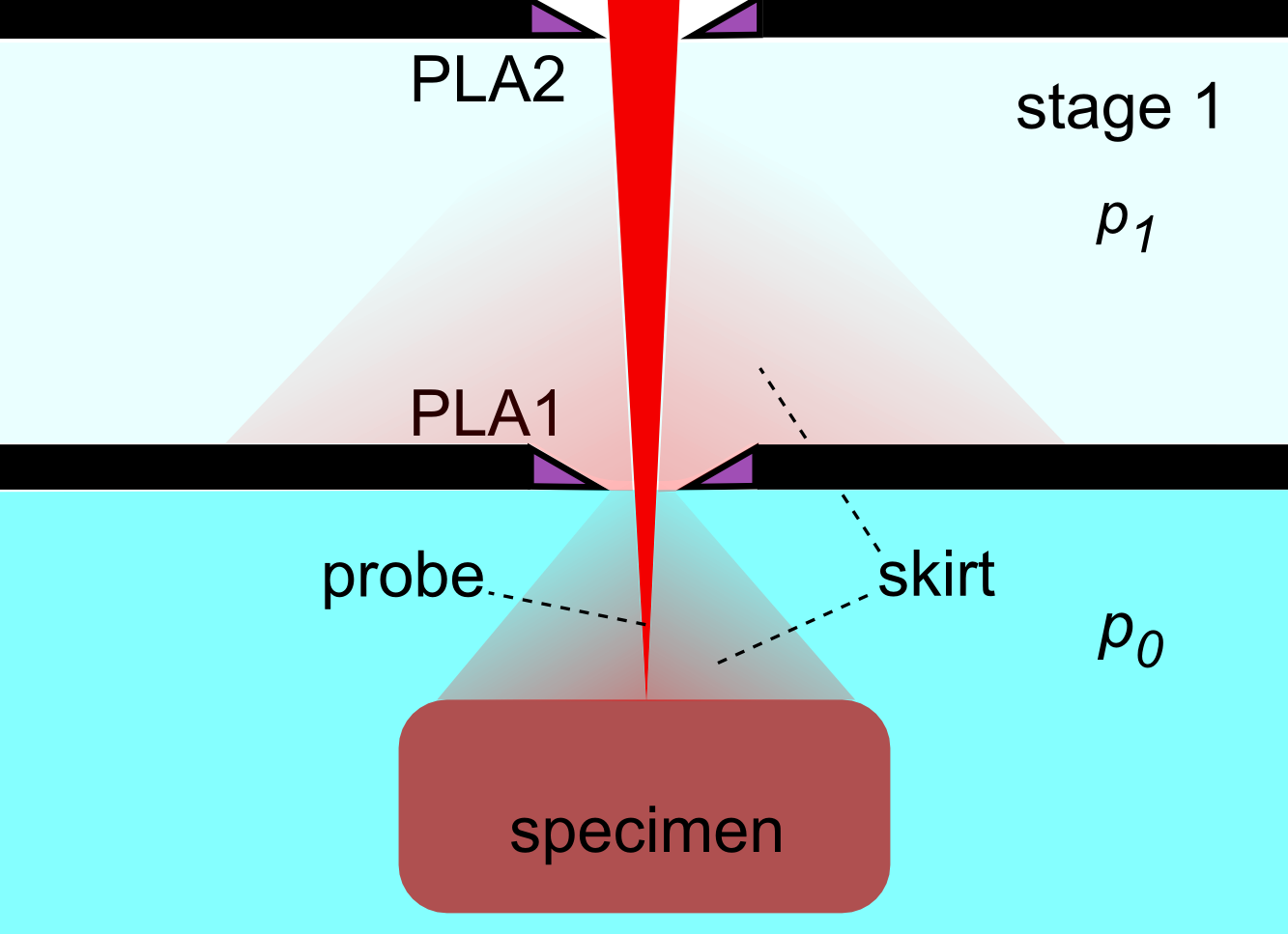
electron skirts in main chamber and intermediate stage

By the use of differential pumping, an electron beam is generated and propagated freely in the vacuum of the upper column, from the electron gun down to PLA2, from which point onwards the electron beam gradually loses electrons due to electron scattering by gas molecules. Initially, the amount of electron scattering is negligible inside the intermediate cavity, but as the beam encounters an increasingly denser gas jet formed by the PLA1, the losses become significant. After the beam enters the specimen chamber, the electron losses increase exponentially at a rate depending on the prevailing pressure, the nature of gas and the acceleration voltage of the beam. The fraction of beam transmitted along the PLA1 axis can be seen by a set of characteristic curves for a given product p_{0}D, where D is the aperture diameter. Eventually, the electron beam becomes totally scattered and lost, but before this happens, a useful amount of electrons is retained in the original focused spot over a finite distance, which can still be used for imaging. This is possible because the removed electrons are scattered and distributed over a broad area like a skirt (electron skirt) surrounding the focused spot. Because the electron skirt width is orders of magnitude greater than the spot width, with orders of magnitude less current density, the skirt contributes only background (signal) noise without partaking in the contrast generated by the central spot. The particular conditions of pressure, distance and beam voltage over which the electron beam remains useful for imaging purposes has been termed oligo-scattering regime in distinction from single-, plural- and multiple-scattering regimes used in prior literature.

For a given beam accelerating voltage and gas, the distance L from PLA1, over which useful imaging is possible, is inversely proportional to the chamber pressure p_{0}. As a rule of thumb, for a 5 kV beam in air, it is required that the product p_{0}L = 1 Pa·m or less. By this second principle of electron beam transfer, the design and operation of an ESEM is centered on refining and miniaturizing all the devices controlling the specimen movement and manipulation, and signal detection. The problem then reduces to achieving sufficient engineering precision for the instrument to operate close to its physical limit, corresponding to optimum performance and range of capabilities. A figure of merit has been introduced to account for any deviation by a given machine from the optimum performance capability.

=== Signal detection ===
The electron beam impinges on the specimen and penetrates to a certain depth depending on the accelerating voltage and the specimen nature. From the ensuing interaction, signals are generated in the same way as in an SEM. Thus, we get secondary and backscattered electrons, X-rays and cathodoluminescence (light). All of these signals are detected also in the ESEM but with certain differences in the detector design and principles used.

==== Secondary electrons ====
The conventional secondary electron detector of SEM (Everhart–Thornley detector) cannot be used in the presence of gas because of an electrical discharge (arcing) caused by the kilovolt bias associated with this detector. In lieu of this, the environmental gas itself has been used as a detector for imaging in this mode:

===== Gaseous detection device =====
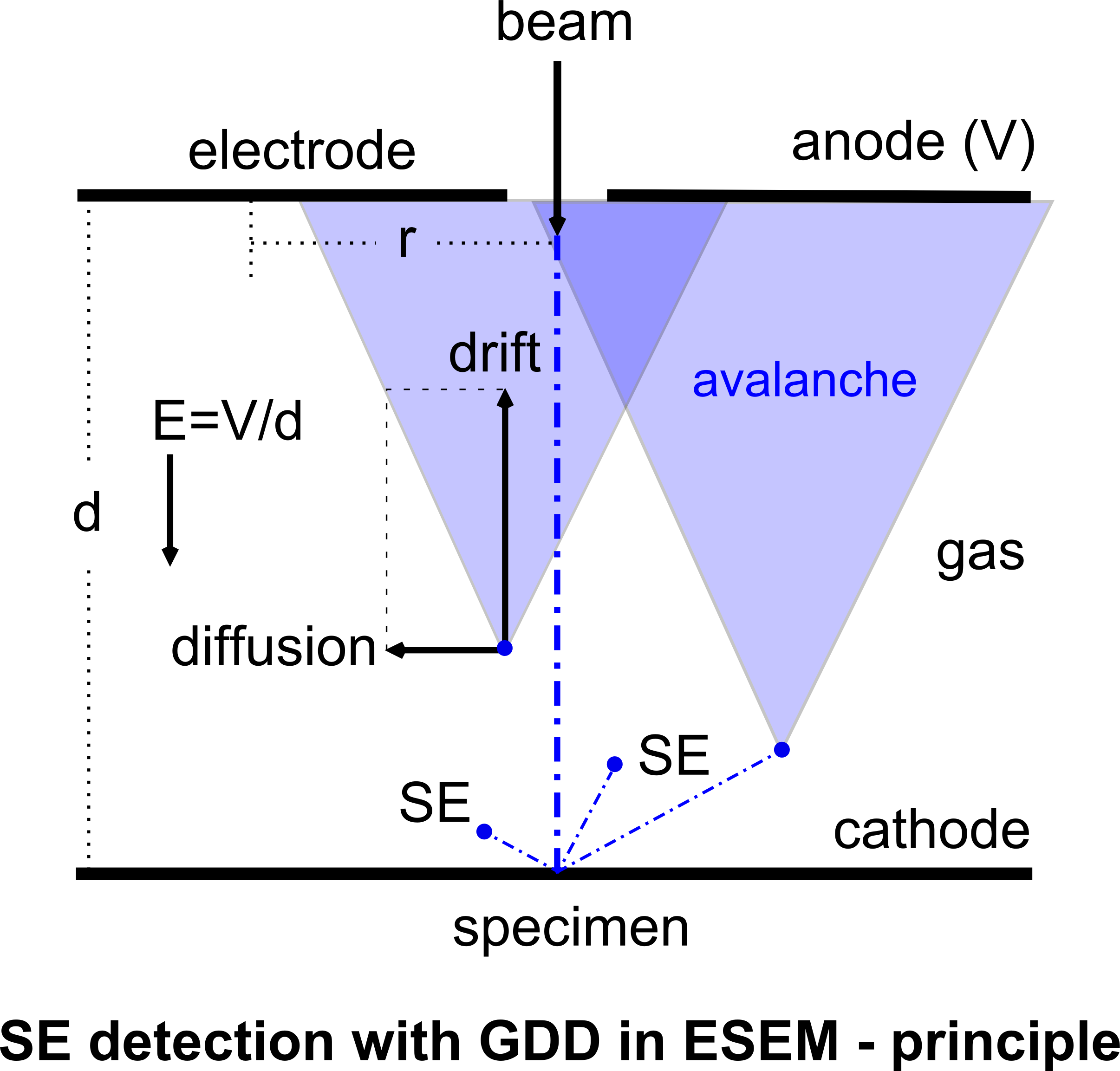
ESEM gaseous detection device (GDD)-principle

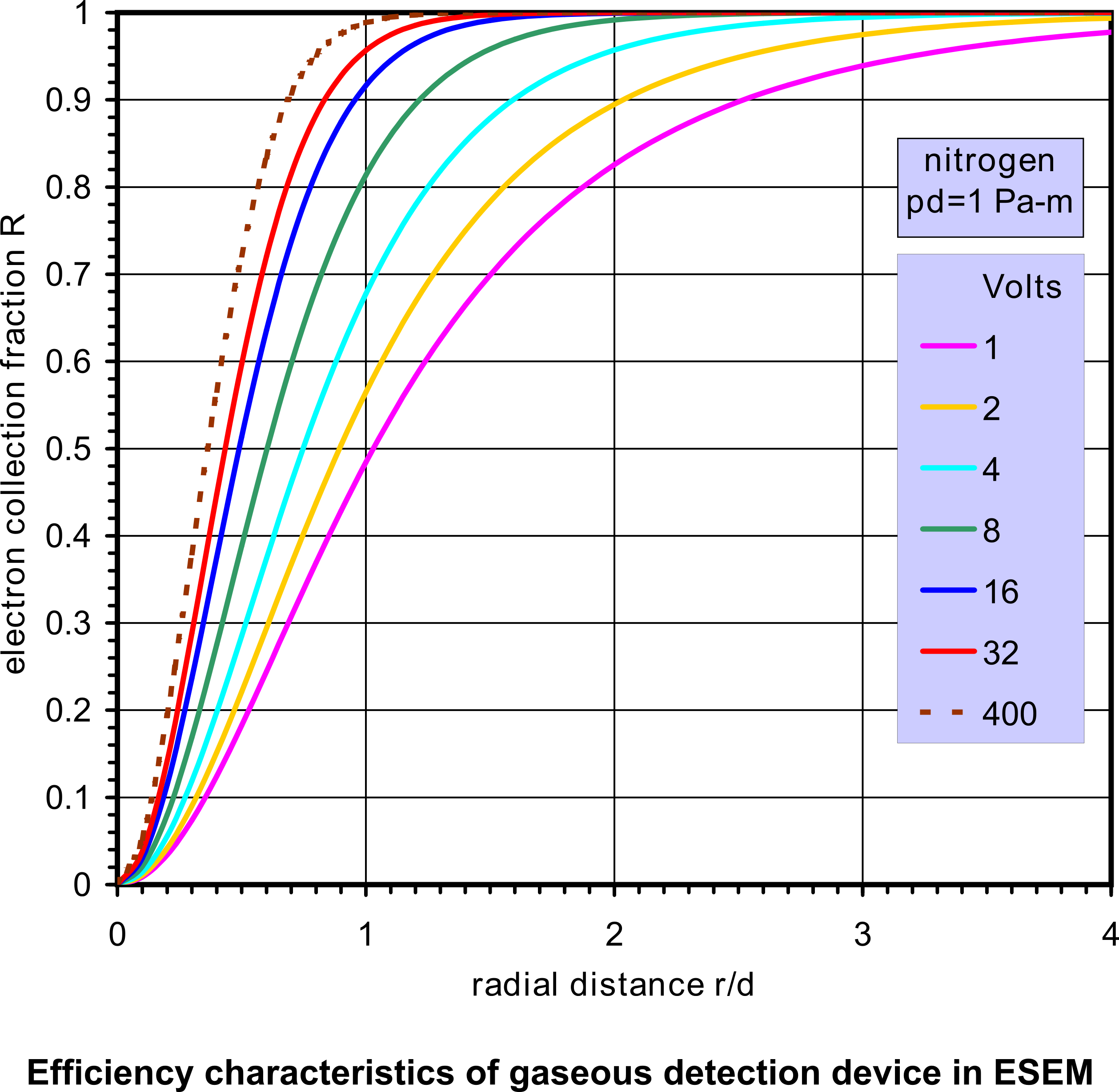
Efficiency characteristics of gaseous detection device in ESEM

In a simple form, the gaseous detection device (GDD) employs an electrode with a voltage up to several hundred volts to collect the secondary electrons in the ESEM. The principle of this SE detector is best described by considering two parallel plates at a distance d apart with a potential difference V generating a uniform electric field E = V/d, and is shown in the accompanying diagram of the GDD. Secondary electrons released from the specimen at the point of beam impingement are driven by the field force towards the anode electrode but the electrons also move radially due to thermal diffusion from collisions with the gas molecules. The variation of electron collection fraction R within anode radius r vs. r/d, for fixed values of anode bias V, at constant product of (pressure·distance) p·d = 1 Pa·m, is given by the accompanying characteristic curves of efficiency of the GDD. All of the secondary electrons are detected if the parameters of this device are properly designed. This clearly shows that practically 100% efficiency is possible within a small radius of collector electrode with only moderate bias. At these levels of bias, no catastrophic discharge takes place. Instead, a controlled proportional multiplication of electrons is generated as the electrons collide with gas molecules releasing new electrons on their way to the anode. This principle of avalanche amplification operates similarly to proportional counters used to detect high energy radiation. The signal thus picked up by the anode is further amplified and processed to modulate a display screen and form an image as in SEM. Notably, in this design and the associated gaseous electron amplification, the product p·d is an independent parameter, so that there is a wide range of values of pressure and electrode geometry which can be described by the same characteristics. The consequence of this analysis is that the secondary electrons are possible to detect in a gaseous environment even at high pressures, depending on the engineering efficacy of any given instrument.

As a further characteristic of the GDD, a gaseous scintillation avalanche also accompanies the electron avalanche and, by detection of the light produced with a photo-multiplier, corresponding SE images can be routinely made. The frequency response of this mode has allowed the use of true TV scanning rates. This mode of the detector has been employed by a latest generation of commercial instruments.

The GDD has become possible first in the ESEM and has produced a practically 100% SE collection efficiency not previously possible with the Everhart–Thornley SE detector where the free trajectories of electrons in vacuum cannot all be bent towards the detector. As is further explained below, backscattered electrons can also be detected by the signal-gas interactions, so that various parameters of this generalized gaseous detector must be controlled to separate the BSE component out of the SE image. Therefore, care has been taken to produce nearly pure SE images with these detectors, then called ESD (environmental secondary detector) and GSED (gaseous secondary electron detector).

==== Backscattered electrons ====
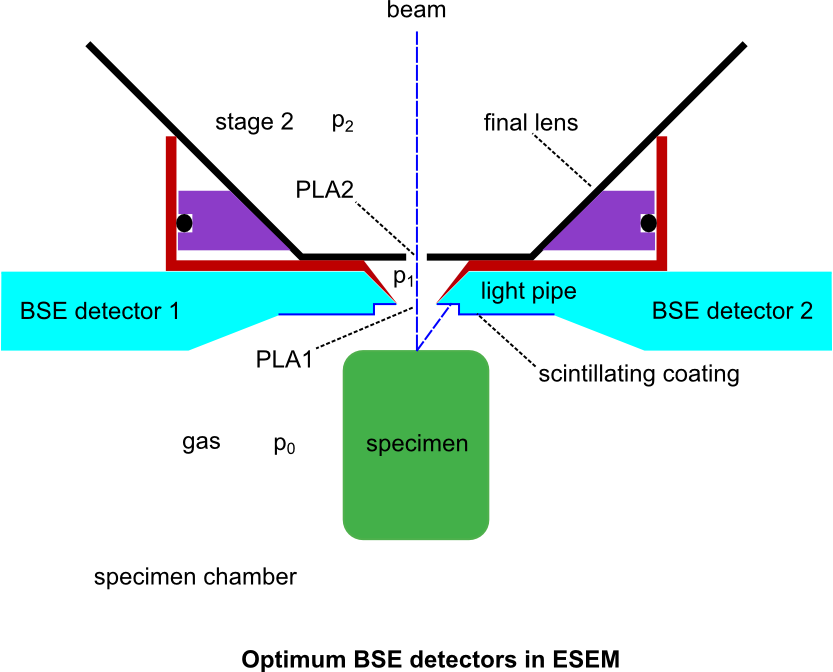
Optimum BSE detectors in ESEM

Backscattered electrons (BSE) are those emitted back out from the specimen due to beam-specimen interactions where the electrons undergo elastic and inelastic scattering. They have energies from 50 eV up to the energy of the primary beam by conventional definition. For the detection and imaging with these electrons, scintillating and solid state materials have been used in the SEM. These materials have been adapted and used also in ESEM in addition to the use of the GDD for BSE detection and imaging.

BSE pass through the gaseous volume between the electrodes of the GDD and generate additional ionization and avalanche amplification. There is an inner volume where the secondary electrons dominate with small or negligible BSE contribution, whilst the outer gaseous volume is acted upon mainly by the BSE. It is possible to separate the corresponding detection volumes so that near pure BSE images can be made with the GDD. The relationship of relative strength of the two signals, SE and BSE, has been worked out by detailed equations of charge distribution in the ESEM. The analysis of plane electrodes is essential in understanding the principles and requirements involved and by no means indicate the best choice of electrode configuration, as discussed in the published theory of the GDD.

===== Adapted detectors =====
Despite the above developments, devoted BSE detectors in the ESEM have played an important role, since the BSE remain a useful detection mode yielding information not possible to obtain with SE. The conventional BSE detection means have been adapted to operate in the gaseous conditions of the ESEM. The BSE having a high energy are self-propelled to the corresponding detector without significant obstruction by the gas molecules. Annular or quadrant solid-state detectors have been employed for this purpose but their geometry is not easily adaptable to the requirements of ESEM for optimum operation. As a result, not much use has been reported of these detectors on genuine ESEM instruments at high pressure. The "Robinson" BSE detector is tuned for operation up to around 100 Pa at the usual working distance of conventional SEM for the suppression of specimen charging, whilst electron collection at the short working distance and high pressure conditions make it inadequate for the ESEM. However, plastic scintillating materials being easily adaptable have been used for BSE and made to measure according to the strictest requirements of the system. Such work culminated in the use of a pair of wedge-shaped detectors saddling a conical PLA1 and abutting to its rim, so that the dead detection space is reduced to a minimum, as shown in the accompanying figure of optimum BSE detectors. The photon conduction is also optimized by the geometry of the light pipes, whilst the pair of symmetrical detectors allow the separation of topography (signal subtraction) and atomic number contrast (signal addition) of the specimen surface to be displayed with the best ever signal-to-noise-ratio. This scheme has further allowed the use of color by superimposing various signals in a meaningful way. These simple but special detectors became possible in the conditions of ESEM, since bare plastic does not charge by the BSE. A very fine wire mesh with appropriate spacing has been proposed as a GDD when gas is present and to conduct negative charge away from the plastic detectors when the gas is pumped out, towards a universal ESEM. Since the associated electronics involve a photomultiplier with a wide frequency response, true TV scanning rates are available. This is an attribute to maintain with an ESEM that enables the examination of processes in situ in real time. In comparison, no such imaging has been \ reported with the electron avalanche mode of the GDD yet (as of March, 2025).

The use of scintillating BSE detectors in ESEM is compatible with the GDD for simultaneous SE detection, in one way by replacing the top plane electrode with a fine tip needle electrode (detector), which can be easily accommodated with these scintillating BSE detectors. The needle detector and cylindrical geometry (wire) have also been surveyed.

==== Cathodoluminescence ====
Cathodoluminescence is another mode of detection involving the photons generated by the beam-specimen interaction. This mode has been demonstrated to operate also in ESEM by the use of the light pipes after they were cleared of the scintillating coating previously used for BSE detection. However, not much is known on its use outside the experimental prototype originally tested. Clearly, ESEM has advantages in this detection mode compared to SEM, since the natural surface of any specimen can be examined in the imaging process. Cathodoluminescence is a materials property, but with various specimen treatments required and other limitations in SEM \ this mode of detection has not been popular in the past. However, this is now available for the examination of untreated specimen surfaces.

==== X-rays ====
The characteristic elemental X-rays produced also in the ESEM can be detected by the same detectors used in the SEM. However, there is an additional complexity arising from the X-rays produced from the electron skirt. These X-rays come from a larger area than in SEM and the spatial resolution is significantly reduced, since the "background" X-ray signals cannot be simply "suppressed" out of the probe interaction volume. However, various schemes have been proposed to solve this problem. These methods involve spot masking, or the extrapolation technique by varying the pressure and calibrating out the effects of skirt, whereby improvement has been achieved.

==== Specimen current ====
In vacuum SEM, the specimen absorbed current mode is used as an alternative mode for imaging of conductive specimens. Specimen current results from the difference of electron beam current minus the sum of SE and BSE current. However, in the presence of gas and the ensuing ionization, it would be problematic to separate this mode of detection out of the generally operating gaseous detection device. Hence this mode, by its definition, may be considered as unsustainable in the ESEM. Shah and Becket assumed the operation of the specimen absorbed current mode if the conductivity of their specimen was assured during the examination of wet botanical samples; in fact, Shah by 1987 still considered the ionisation products in gas by SE and BSE as a formidable obstacle, since he believed that the ionisation did not carry any information about the specimen. However, he later embraced to correct role of gaseous ionisation during image formation.

=== Specimen charging ===
The electron beam impinging on insulating specimens accumulates negative charge, which creates an electrical potential tending to deflect the electron beam from the scanned point in conventional SEM. This appears as charging artifacts on the image, which are eliminated in the SEM by depositing a conductive layer on the specimen surface prior to examination. Instead of this coating, the gas in the ESEM being electrically conductive prevents negative charge accumulation. The good conductivity of the gas is due to the ionization it undergoes by the incident electron beam and the ionizing SE and BSE signals. This principle constitutes yet another deviation from conventional vacuum electron microscopy.

Charge contrast imaging is a scanning electron microscope imaging mode which can produce images of otherwise invisible microstructures in insulating materials and in fossils. The technique has been used to detect changes in minerals which reflect compositional differences. Since charge is suppressed in ESEM at sufficient gas pressure, it is possible to regulate the amount of charging by varying the pressure between the SEM vacuum and some low pressure while observing the charging contrast variation effects. See examples with a series of images, also four images of the same field, and with color superposition.

=== Contrast and resolution ===
As a consequence of the way ESEM works, the resolution is preserved relative to the SEM. That is because the resolving power of the instrument is determined by the electron beam diameter which is unaffected by the gas over the useful travel distance before it is completely lost. This has been demonstrated on the commercial ESEMs that provide the finest beam spots by imaging test specimens, i.e. customarily gold particles on a carbon substrate, in both vacuum and gas. However, the contrast decreases accordingly as the electron probe loses current with travel distance and increase of pressure. The loss of current intensity, if necessary, can be compensated by increasing the incident beam current which is accompanied by an increased spot size. Therefore, the practical resolution depends on the original specimen contrast of a given feature, on the design of the instrument that should provide minimal beam and signal losses and on the operator selecting the correct parameters for each application. The aspects of contrast and resolution have been conclusively determined in the referenced work on the foundations of ESEM and other related works. Further, in relation to this, we have to consider the radiation effects on the specimen.

=== Specimen transfer ===
The majority of available instruments vent their specimen chamber to the ambient pressure (100 kPa) with every specimen transfer. A large volume of gas has to be pumped out and replaced with the gas of interest, usually water vapor supplied from a water reservoir connected to the chamber via some pressure regulating (e.g. needle) valve. In many applications this presents no problem, but with those ones requiring uninterrupted 100% relative humidity, it has been found that the removal of ambient gas is accompanied by lowering the relative humidity below the 100% level during specimen transfer. This clearly defeats the very purpose of ESEM for this class of applications. However, such a problem does not arise with the original prototype ESEM using an intermediate specimen transfer chamber, so that the main chamber is always maintained at 100% relative humidity without interruption during a study. The specimen transfer chamber (tr-ch) shown in the diagram of ESEM gas pressure stages contains a small water reservoir so that the initial ambient air can be quickly pumped out and practically instantaneously replaced with water vapor without going through a limited conductance tube and valve. The main specimen chamber can be maintained at 100% relative humidity, if the only leak of vapor is through the small PLA1, but not during violent pumping with every specimen change. Once the wet specimen is in equilibrium with 100% relative humidity in the transfer chamber, within seconds, a gate valve opens and the specimen is transferred in the main specimen chamber maintained at the same pressure. An alternative approach involving controlled pumping of the main chamber may not solve the problem entirely either because the 100% relative humidity cannot be approached monotonically without any drying, or the process is very slow; inclusion of a water reservoir inside the main chamber means that one cannot lower the relative humidity until after all of the water is pumped out (i.e. a defective control of the relative humidity). See "Operation" on page 238 of the ESEM Foundations.

== Radiation effects ==
During the interaction of an electron beam with a specimen, changes to the specimen at varying degrees are almost inevitable. These changes, or radiation effects, may or may not become visible both in SEM and ESEM. However, such effects are particularly important in the ESEM claiming the ability to view specimens in their natural state. Elimination of the vacuum is a major success towards this aim, so that any detrimental effects from the electron beam itself require special attention. The best way around this problem is to reduce these effects to an absolute minimum with an optimum ESEM design. Beyond this, the user should be aware of their possible existence during the evaluation of results. Usually, these effects appear on the images in various forms due to different electron beam-specimen interactions and processes.

The introduction of gas in an electron microscope is tantamount to a new dimension. Thus, interactions between electron beam and gas together with interactions of gas (and its byproducts) with specimen usher a new area of research with as yet unknown consequences. Some of these may at first appear disadvantageous but later overcome, others may yield unexpected results. The liquid phase in the specimen with mobile radicals may yield a host of phenomena like specimen damage but also enabling the direct imaging of molecular structures.

== Advantages ==
The presence of gas around a specimen creates new possibilities unique to ESEM: (a) liquid-phase electron microscopy is possible since any pressure greater than 609 Pa allows water to be maintained in its liquid phase for temperatures above 0 °C, in contrast to the SEM where specimens are desiccated by the vacuum condition. (b) Electrically non-conductive specimens do not require the preparation techniques used in SEM to render the surface conductive, such as the deposition of a thin gold or carbon coating, or other treatments, techniques which also require vacuum in the process. Insulating specimens charge up by the electron beam making imaging problematic or even impossible. (c) The gas itself is used as a detection medium producing novel imaging possibilities, as opposed to vacuum SEM detectors. (d) Plain plastic scintillating BSE detectors can operate uncoated without charging. Hence, these detectors produce the highest possible signal-to-noise-ratio at the lowest possible accelerating voltage, because the BSE do not dissipate any energy in an aluminium coating used for the vacuum SEM.

As a result, specimens can be examined faster and more easily, avoiding complex and time-consuming preparation methods, without modifying the natural surface or creating artifacts by the preceding preparation work, or the vacuum of the SEM. Gas/liquid/solid interactions can be studied dynamically in situ and in real time, or recorded for post processing. Temperature variations from subzero to above 1000 °C and various ancillary devices for specimen micro-manipulation have become a new reality. Biological specimens can be maintained fresh and live. Therefore, ESEM constitutes a radical breakthrough from conventional electron microscopy, where the vacuum condition precluded the advantages of electron beam imaging becoming universal.

== Disadvantages ==
The main disadvantage arises from the limitation of the distance in the specimen chamber over which the electron beam remains usable in the gaseous environment. The useful distance of the specimen from the PLA1 is a function of accelerating voltage, beam current, nature and pressure of gas, and of the aperture diameter used. This distance varies from around 10 mm to a fraction of a millimeter as the gas pressure may vary from low vacuum to one atmosphere. For optimum operation, both the manufacturer and the user must conform, in the design and operation, to satisfy this fundamental requirement. Furthermore, as the pressure can be brought to a very low level, an ESEM will revert to typical SEM operation without the above disadvantages. Therefore, one may trade-off the ESEM characteristics with those of SEM by operating in a vacuum. A reconciliation of all these disadvantages and advantages can be attained by a properly designed and operated universal ESEM.

Concomitant with the limitation of useful specimen distance is the minimum magnification possible, since at very high pressure the distance becomes so small that the field of view is limited by the PLA1 size. In the very low magnification range of SEM, overlapping the upper magnification of a light microscope, the superior field is limited to a varying degree by the ESEM mode. The degree of this limitation strongly depends on instrument design.

As X-rays are also generated by the surrounding gas and also come from a larger specimen area than in SEM, special algorithms are required to deduct the effects of gas on the information extracted during analysis.

The presence of gas may yield unwanted effects in certain applications, but the extent of these will only become clear as further research and development is undertaken to minimize and control radiation effects.

No commercial instrument is as yet (by 2009) available in conformity with all the principles of an optimal design, so that any further limitations listed are characteristic of the existing instruments and not of the ESEM technique, in general.

== Transmission ESEM ==
The ESEM can also be used in transmission mode (TESEM) by appropriate detection means of the transmitted bright and dark field signals through a thin specimen section. This is done by employing solid state detectors below the specimen, or the use of the gaseous detection device (GDD). The generally low accelerating voltages used in ESEM enhance the contrast of unstained specimens while they allow nanometer resolution imaging as obtained in transmission mode especially with field emission type of electron guns.

== ESEM-DIA ==
ESEM-DIA is an abbreviation standing for a system consisting of an ESEM microscope coupled to a digital image analysis (DIA) program. It directly makes possible the quantitative treatment of the digitally acquired ESEM images, and allows image recognition and image processing by machine learning based on neural network.

== Applications ==
Some representative applications of ESEM are in the following areas:

=== Biology ===
An early application involved the examination of fresh and living plant material including a study of Leptospermum flavescens. The advantages of ESEM in studies of microorganisms and a comparison of preparation techniques have been demonstrated.

=== Medicine and medical ===
The influence of drugs on cancer cells has been studied with liquid-phase ESEM-STEM.

=== Archaeology ===
In conservation science, it is often necessary to preserve the specimens intact or in their natural state.

=== Industry ===
ESEM studies have been performed on fibers in the wool industry with and without particular chemical and mechanical treatments. In cement industry, it is important to examine various processes in situ in the wet and dry state.

=== In situ studies ===
Studies in situ can be performed with the aid of various ancillary devices. These have involved hot stages to observe processes at elevated temperatures, microinjectors of liquids and specimen extension or deformation devices.

=== General materials science ===
Biofilms can be studied without the artifacts introduced during SEM preparation, as well as dentin and detergents have been investigated since the early years of ESEM.

== Commercial ESEM ==
The ESEM has appeared under different manufacturing brand names. The term ESEM is a generic name first publicly introduced in 1980 and afterwards unceasingly used in all publications by Danilatos and almost all users of all ESEM type instruments. The ELECTROSCAN ESEM trademark was obtained intermittently until 1999, when it was allowed to lapse. The word "environmental" was originally introduced in continuation to the prior (historical) use of "environmental" cells in transmission microscopy, although the word "atmospheric" has also been used to refer to an ESEM at one atmosphere pressure (ASEM) but not with any commercial instruments. Other competing manufacturers have used the terms "Natural SEM" (Hitachi), "Wet-SEM" (ISI), "Bio-SEM" (short-lived, AMRAY), "VP-SEM" (variable-pressure SEM; LEO/Zeiss-SMT), "LVSEM" (low-vacuum SEM, often also denoting low-voltage SEM; JEOL), all of which seem to be transient in time according to prevailing manufacturing schedules. Until recently, all these names referred to instruments operating up to about 100 Pa and with BSE detectors only. Lately, the Zeiss-SMT VP-SEM has been extended to higher pressure together with a gaseous ionization or gaseous scintillation as the SE mechanism for image formation. Therefore, it is improper to identify the term ESEM with one only brand of commercial instrument in juxtaposition to other competing commercial (or laboratory) brands with different names, as some confusion may arise from past use of trademarks.

Similarly, the term GDD is generic covering the entire novel gaseous detection principle in ESEM. The terms ESD and GSED, in particular, have been used in conjunction with a commercial ESEM to denote the secondary electron mode of this detector.

== Gallery of ESEM images ==
The following are examples of images taken using an ESEM.

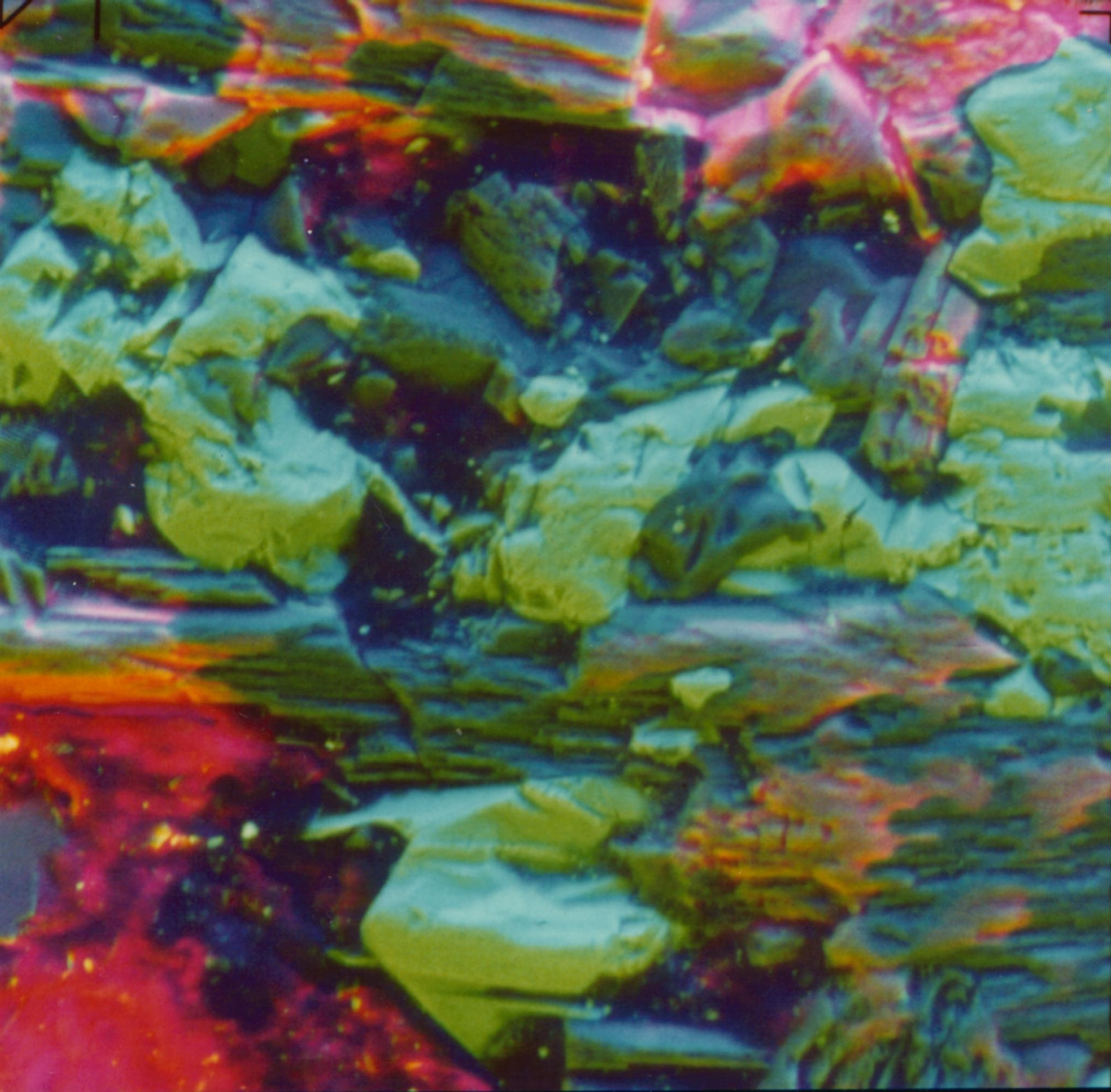
Aluminium/iron/silicon mineral with other impurities and surface contaminants imaged in an ESEM by the use of two symmetrical plastic scintillating backscattered electron detectors and the gaseous detector device (GDD)

Air jet through 100 micrometre aperture into ESEM chamber held at 200 Pa, image taken with gaseous detection device, 15 kV

Imaging at true TV scanning rate in ESEM: Water microdroplets from capillary needle on tissue paper. Photos from TV monitor displaying single frames of video recording. Unprocessed BSE signal, field width 380 μm.

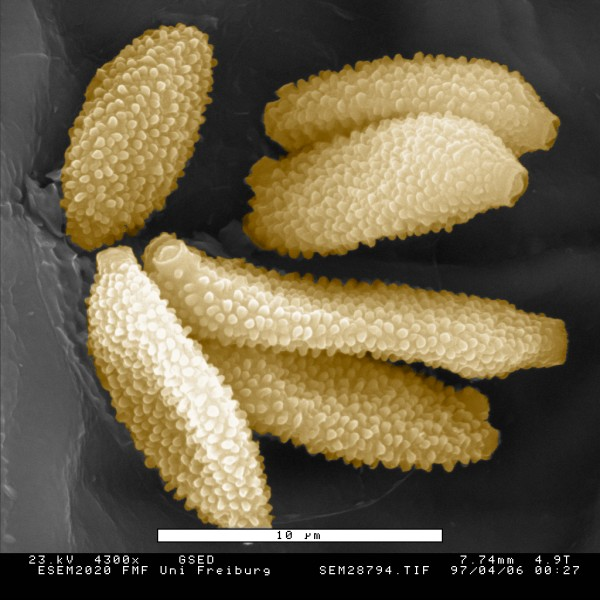
Orchid pollen viewed in an ElectroScan 2020 ESEM, with GSED, 23 kV and 4.9 torr (=653 Pa).

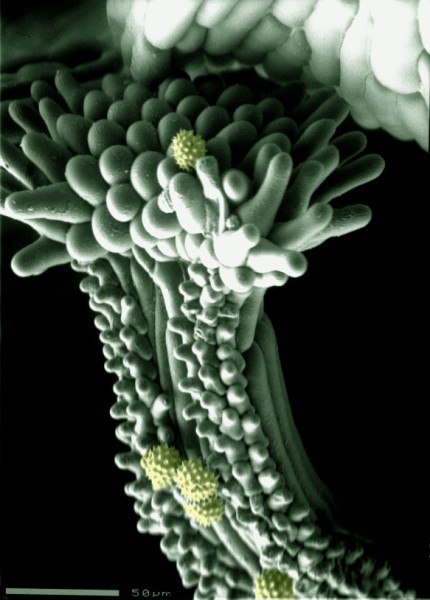
Compound flower with pollen, SE image, ElectroSscan E3 ESEM.
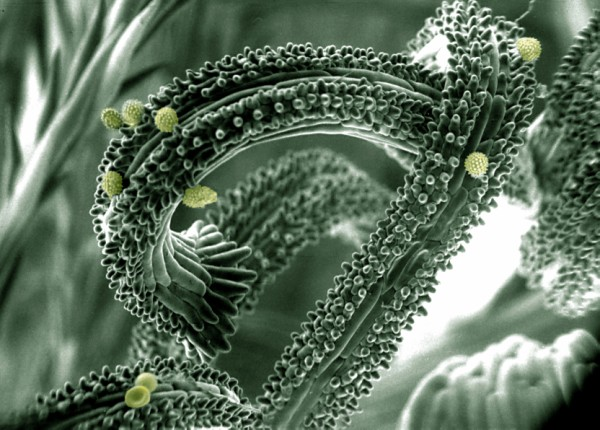
Compound flower with pollen, SE image, ElectroSscan E3 ESEM.

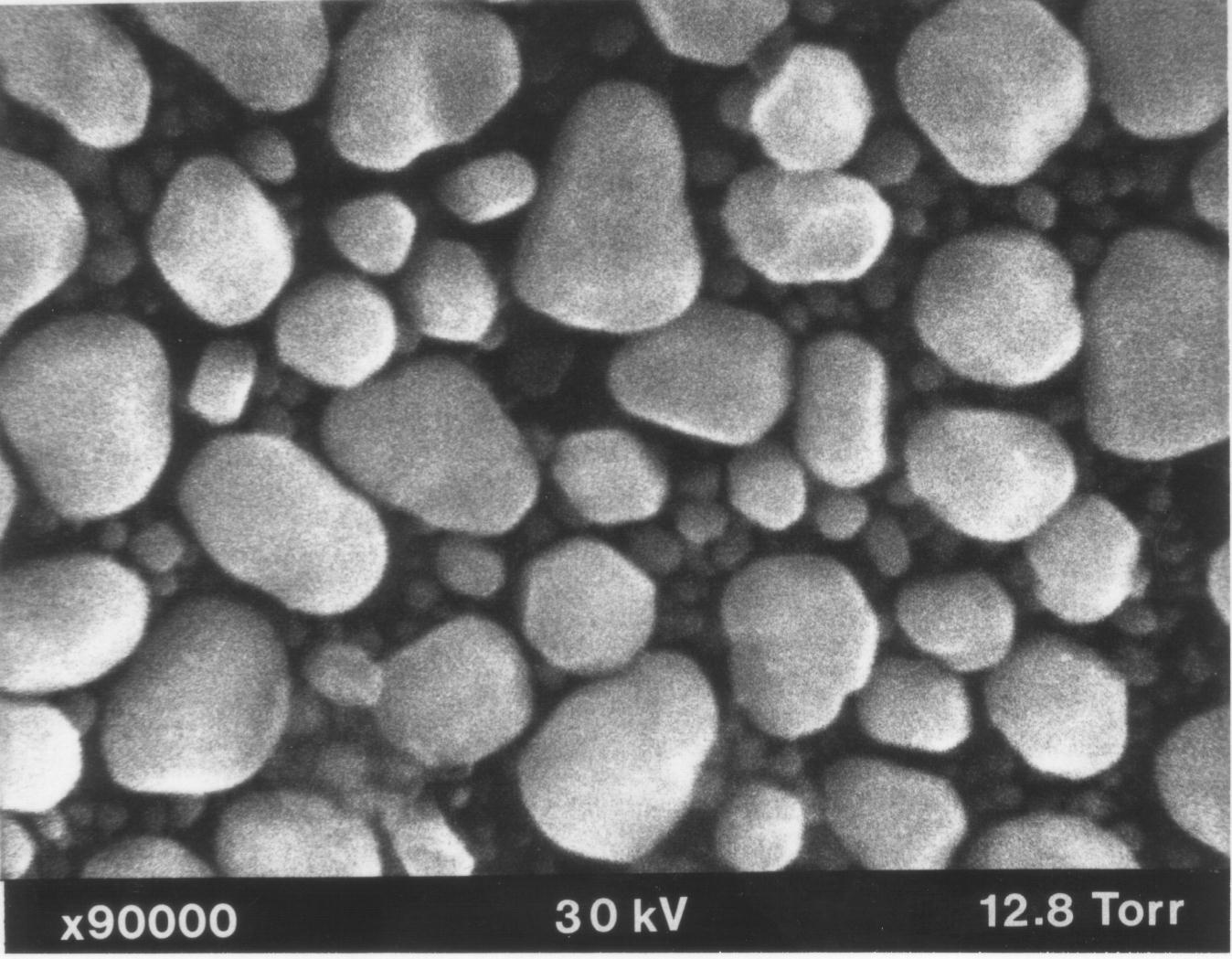
Resolution test specimen of gold particles on carbon in ESEM, at high magnification. Field width 1.2 μm

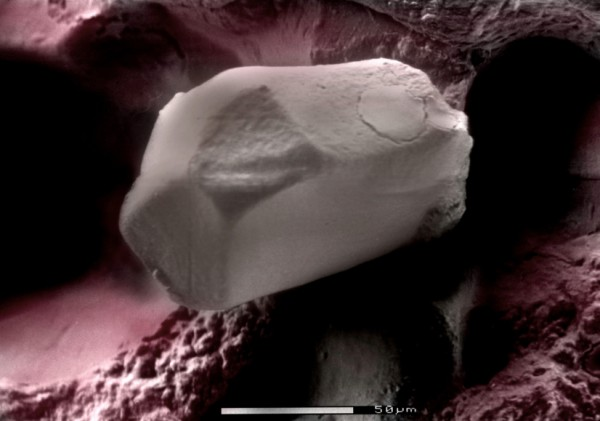
Bone marrow of cow, SE image, ElectroSscan E3 ESEM.

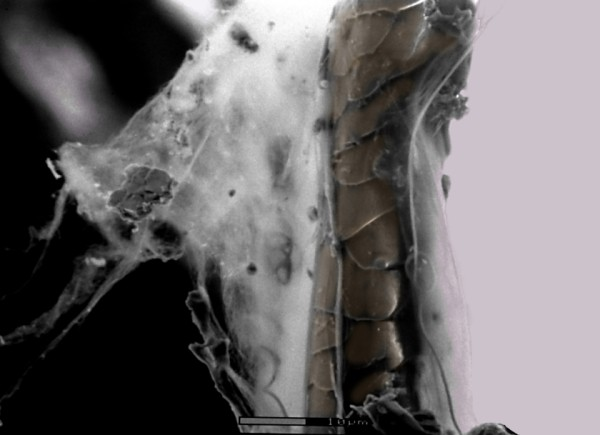
Hair in spiders web, SE image, ElectroSscan E3 ESEM.

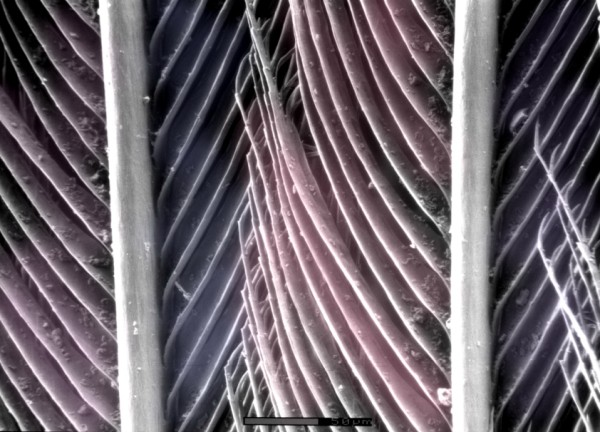
Feather, SE image, ElectroSscan E3 ESEM.

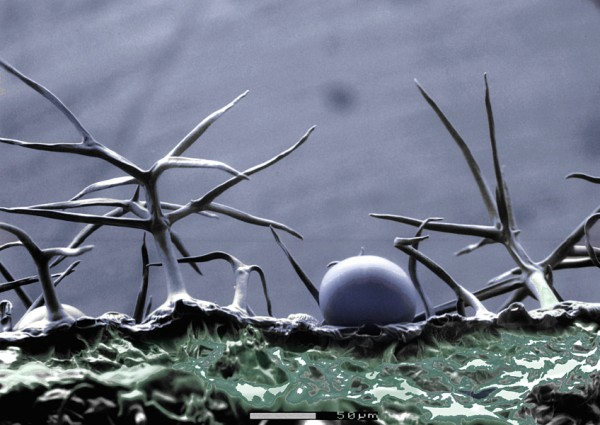
Lavender leaf, SE image, ElectroSscan E3 ESEM.

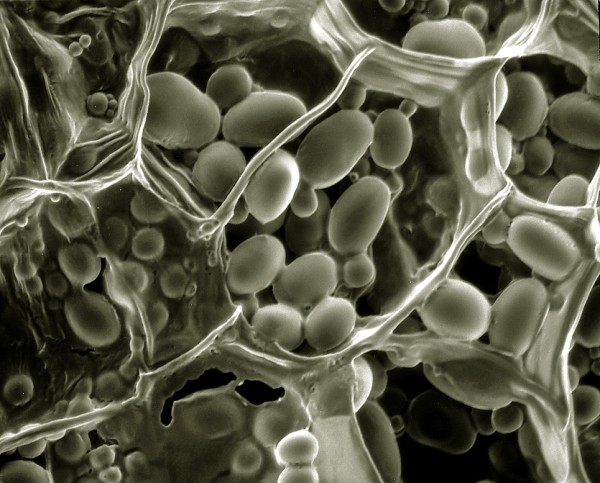
Potato starch, SE image, ElectroSscan E3 ESEM.

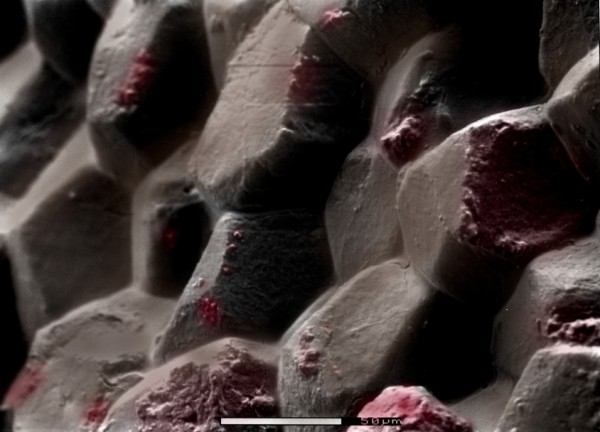
Bone marrow of cow (horizontal), SE image, ElectroSscan E3 ESEM.

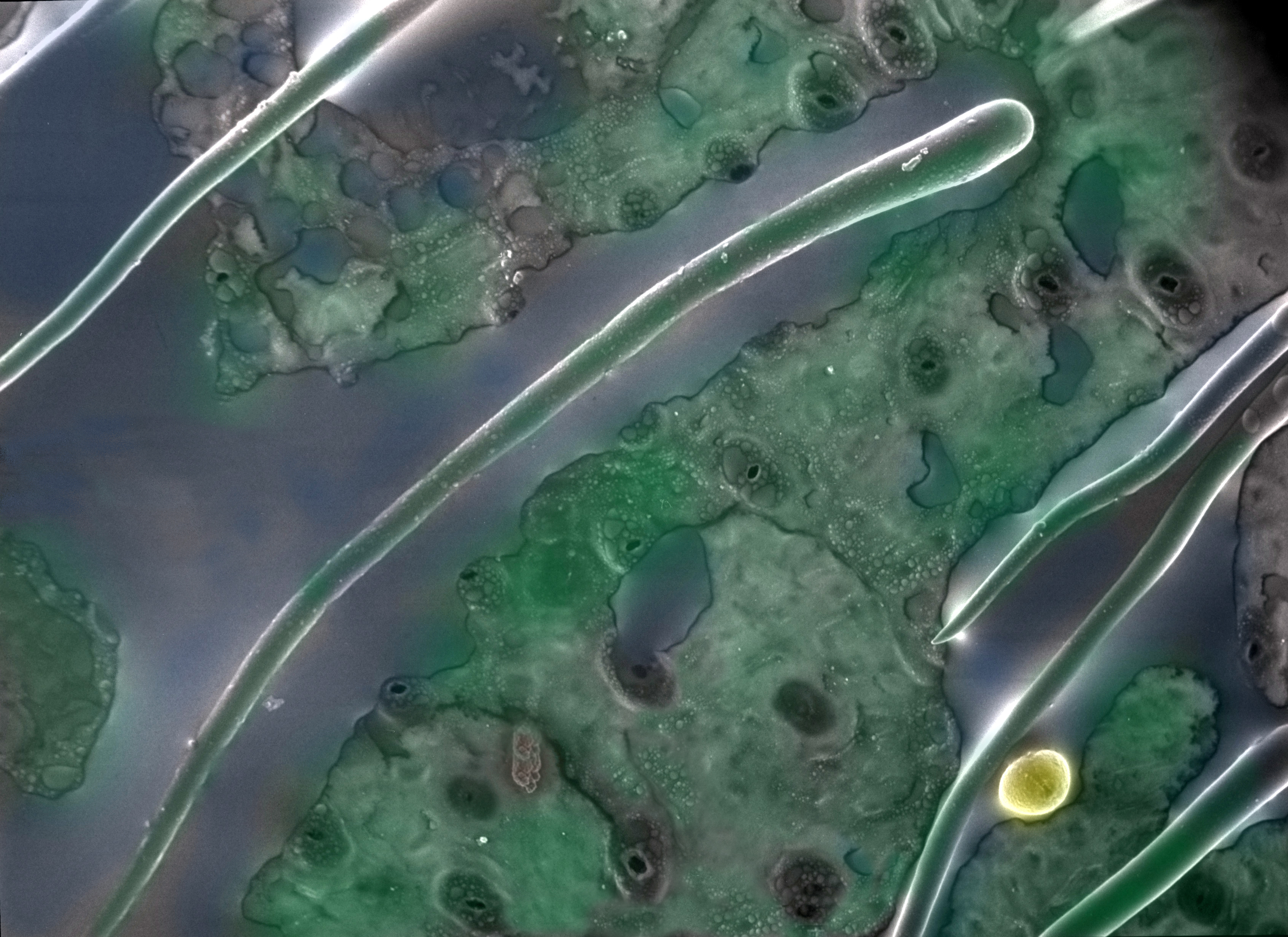
Wet bottle brush leaf stomata and leaf hairs, ElectroSscan E3 ESEM.

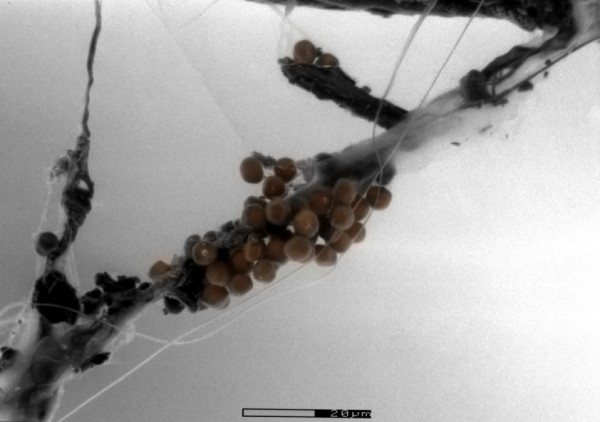
Fungal spores in spiders web, SE image, ElectroSscan E3 ESEM.

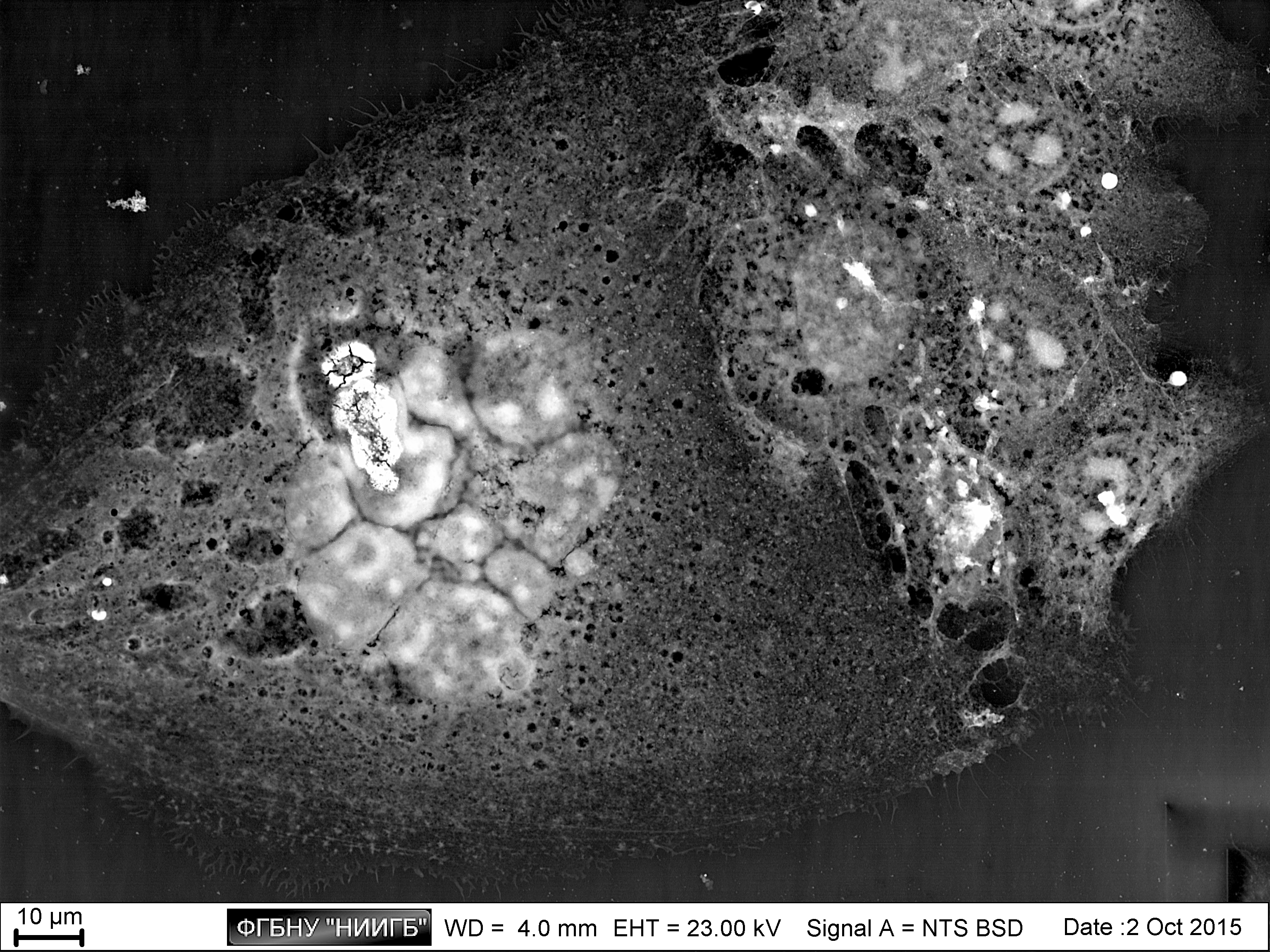
4T1 cells line. The micrograph of mouse breast tumor cells on cultural plastic, BSE image, ZEISS EVO LS10.

Greasy wool fibers going from wet to dry in ESEM, at room temperature. Field width 270 μm, BSE, 10 kV.
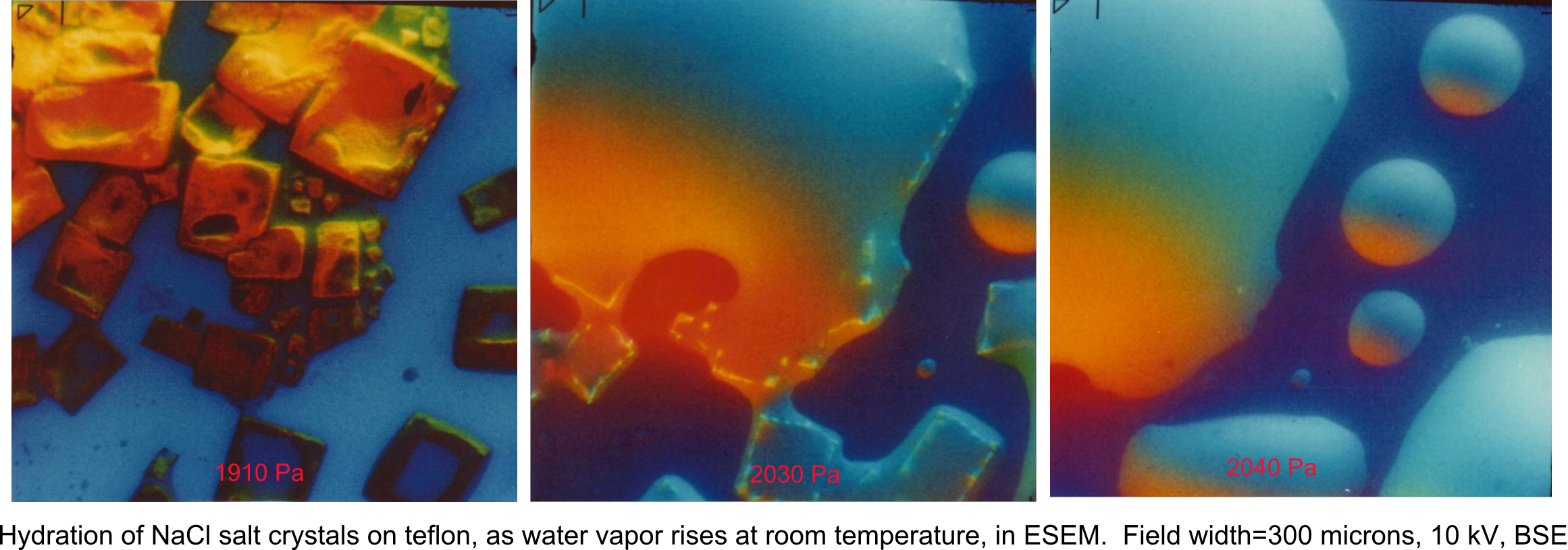
Hydration of NaCl crystals on Teflon, as water vapor pressure rises, at room temperature, in an ESEM by the use of two symmetrical plastic scintillating backscattered electron detectors. Field width 300 μm, 10 kV

Live Leptospermum flavescens stem cells with water film on left, at room temperature

== Bibliography ==
- Danilatos, G.D. (1988). "Foundations of Environmental Scanning Electron Microscopy". In Hawkes, Peter W. (ed.). Advances in Electronics and Electron Physics. Vol. 71. Academic Press. pp. 109–250. ISBN 978-0-12-014671-0.
