= GDD =

GDD may refer to:

- Game design document, a design document specific to video games
- Gaseous detection device, a technology used with some electron microscopes and similar instruments
- Global developmental delay, a childhood medical disorder
- Goal-directed design, a user interface design method developed by software designer Alan Cooper
- Group delay dispersion (or group velocity dispersion), effect of a medium on an optical signal
- Google Developer Day, Google promotional events for developers
- Great Dragon's Dale, a Russian-language video gaming magazine
- Growing degree-day, a unit for measuring climatic warmth over a period of time
- Gondangdia railway station, a railway station in Jakarta, Indonesia
