= Volkmarsberg =

Coordinates: 48°47′N 10°05′E

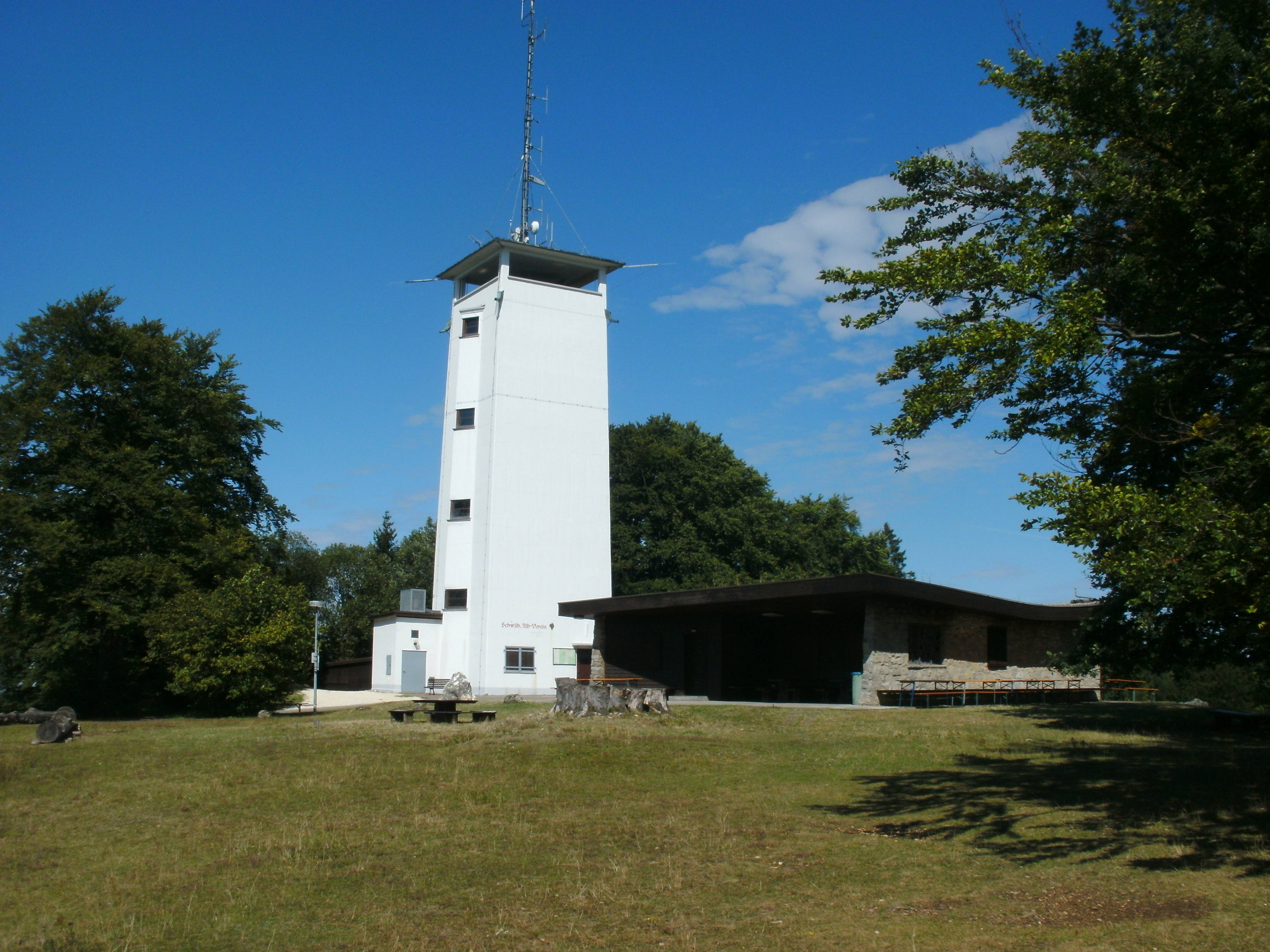
Volkmarsberg Tower and shelter

The Volkmarsberg is a mountain in the Swabian Alb, south of Aalen in the Ostalbkreis, Germany, with an altitude of 743 metres (2,438 ft). It rises at the edge of the town of Oberkochen, from where there is a 2.5-kilometre (1.6 mi) path to the summit.

On the summit plateau there is a shelter as well as the 23-metre (75 ft) Volkmarsberg tower, a stone observation tower built in 1930, from which one has a far-reaching view over the entire Ostalbkreis. In rare temperature inversion conditions the 180-kilometre (110 mi) distant Zugspitze can be seen.

Volkmarsberg was designated as a nature reserve in 1938, and recognised by the European Environment Agency as a nature conservation site in 1994.
