= Gerasimos Danilatos =

Greek-Australian physicist

Gerasimos D. Danilatos (also known as Gerry D. Danilatos) (born circa 1946) is a Greek-Australian physicist and inventor of the environmental scanning electron microscope (ESEM).

He was born in Cefalonia, Greece. After the 1953 Ionian earthquake, his family moved to Patras, where he attended elementary and high school.

After high school and military service, he graduated from the National and Kapodistrian University of Athens and completed his physics degree with distinction. In 1972, he emigrated to Australia, and got married in 1979. He received his Ph.D. from the University of New South Wales in January 1978 after completing his Thesis on "dynamic mechanical properties of keratin fibres". As a scientist at the same university, he then developed the ESEM, after prior attempts by other workers to examine wet specimens under the electron beam. For the most part, he received financial support from the Australian Wool Corporation until 1986. In 2003, he received the Ernst Abbe Memorial Award from the New York Microscopical Society for his lifetime achievements.
