= Liquid-Phase Electron Microscopy =

TEM of a specimen in liquid enclosed by two membrane windows supported by silicon microchips. The thickness of the liquid t is kept sufficiently small with respect to the mean free path length of electron scattering in the materials, so that the electron beam is transmitted through the sample for detection. The membrane windows bulge outward into the vacuum.

ESEM of nanoparticles in liquid placed in a vacuum chamber containing a background pressure of vapor. The sample support stage is cooled to achieve condensation, for example, to 4 °C for 813 Pa water vapor. The electron optics in high vacuum is separated from the sample chamber by a pump limiting aperture. Detection of backscattered or secondary electrons is optimal when applying a positive electrical potential V between the sample and the detector, so that a cascade of electrons and ions is created.

Liquid-phase electron microscopy (LP EM) refers to a class of methods for imaging specimens in liquid with nanometer spatial resolution using electron microscopy. LP-EM overcomes the key limitation of electron microscopy: since the electron optics requires a high vacuum, the sample must be stable in a vacuum environment. Many types of specimens relevant to biology, materials science, chemistry, geology, and physics, however, change their properties when placed in a vacuum.

The ability to study liquid samples, particularly those involving water, with electron microscopy has been a wish ever since the early days of electron microscopy but technical difficulties prevented early attempts from achieving high resolution. Two basic approaches exist for imaging liquid specimens: i) closed systems, mostly referred to as liquid cell EM (LC EM), and ii) open systems, often referred to as environmental systems. In closed systems, thin windows made of materials such as silicon nitride or graphene are used to enclose a liquid for placement in the microscope vacuum. Closed cells have found widespread use in the past decade due to the availability of reliable window microfabrication technology. Graphene provides the thinnest possible window. The oldest open system that gained widespread usage was environmental scanning electron microscopy (ESEM) of liquid samples on a cooled stage in a vacuum chamber containing a background pressure of vapor. Low vapor pressure liquids such as ionic liquids can also be studied in open systems. LP-EM systems of both open and closed type have been developed for all three main types of electron microscopy, i.e., transmission electron microscopy (TEM), scanning transmission electron microscopy (STEM), and scanning electron microscope (SEM). Instruments integrating liquid-phase SEM with light microscopy have also been developed. Electron microscopic observation in liquid has been combined with other analytical methods such as electrochemical measurements and energy-dispersive X-ray spectroscopy (EDX).

The benefit of LP EM is the ability to study samples that do not withstand a vacuum or to study materials properties and reactions requiring liquid conditions. Examples of measurements enabled by this technique are the growth of metallic nanoparticles or structures in liquid, materials changes during the cycling of batteries, electrochemical processes such as metal deposition, dynamics of thin water films and diffusion processes, biomineralization processes, protein dynamics and structure, single-molecule localization of membrane proteins in mammalian cells, and the influence of drugs on receptors in cancer cells.

The spatial resolution achievable can be in the sub-nanometer range and depends on the sample composition, structure and thickness, any window materials present, and the sensitivity of the sample to the electron dose required for imaging. Nanometer resolution is obtained even in micrometers-thick water layers for STEM of nanomaterials of high atomic number. Brownian motion was found to be highly reduced with respect to a bulk liquid. STEM detection is also possible in ESEM for imaging nanomaterials and biological cells in liquid. An important aspect of LP EM is the interaction of the electron beam with the sample since the electron beam initiates a complex sequence of radiolytic reactions in water. Nevertheless, quantitative analysis of LP EM data has yielded unique information in a range of scientific areas.
