= Oberkochen =

City in Baden-Württemberg, Germany

- Town
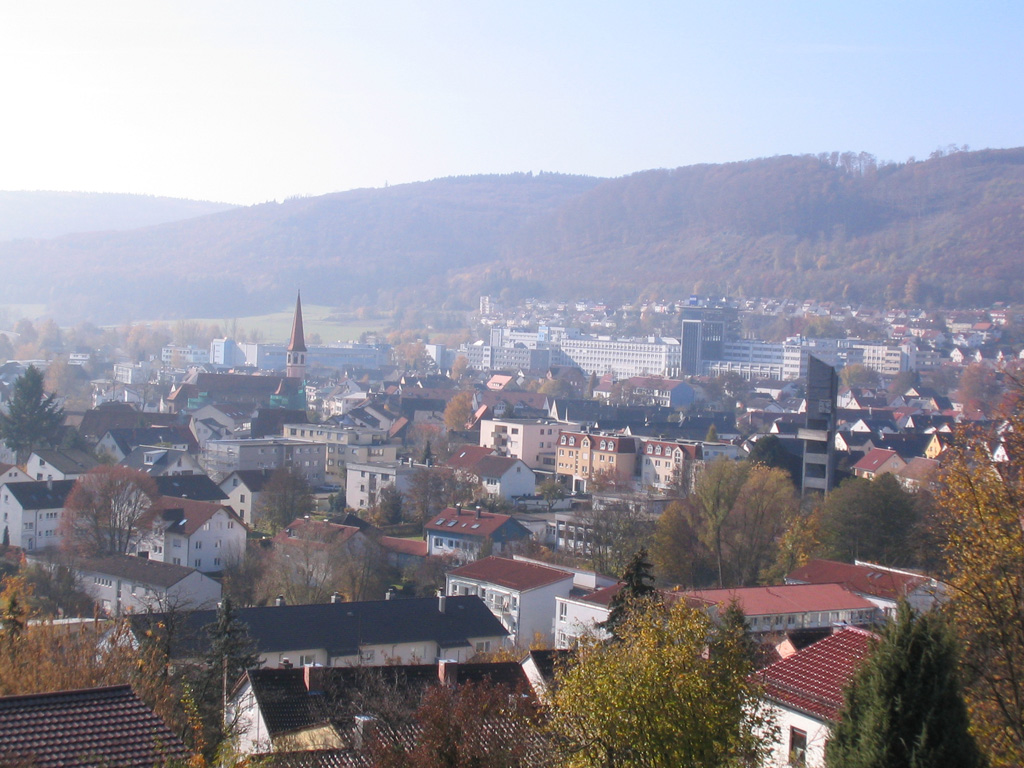
- Oberkochen

- Coat of arms

- Location of Oberkochen within Ostalbkreis district
- Interactive map of Oberkochen
- Location within Germany Location within Baden-Württemberg
- Coordinates: 48°47′02″N 10°06′19″E
- Country: Germany
- State: Baden-Württemberg
- Admin. region: Stuttgart
- District: Ostalbkreis

Government
  - Mayor (2017–25): Marcel Winter

Area
  - Total: 23.55 km^{2} (9.09 sq mi)
- Elevation: 496 m (1,627 ft)

Population (2025-12-31)
  - Total: 7,679
  - Density: 326.1/km^{2} (844.5/sq mi)
- Time zone: UTC+01:00 (CET)
  - Summer (DST): UTC+02:00 (CEST)
- Postal codes: 73447
- Dialling codes: 07364
- Vehicle registration: AA
- Website: www.oberkochen.de

Oberkochen (German pronunciation: [ˈoːbɐˌkɔxn̩], lit. 'Upper Kochen', in contrast to "Lower Kochen") is a municipality (officially a town, despite its size) in the Ostalbkreis, in Baden-Württemberg, in Germany.

== Name ==
The name "Oberkochen" consists of the two German words "ober", meaning "above" or "upper", and "Kocher", the name of the local river. The name indicates, that this settlement lies above the river Kocher or on its upper part. The river Kocher has its spring just to the south of Oberkochen and runs to the north. Therefore, the village next to the north of Oberkochen is Unterkochen, with the German "unter" meaning "lower" or "under".

== Geography ==
Oberkochen is located in and above the valleys of the rivers Kocher and Langertbach between the area of Albuch in the west and north and the area of Härtsfeld in the east. The highest point in the area of Oberkochen is the top of the Volkmarsberg mountain (743 m above sea level). Directly south of the city the river Kocher has its origin.

The city consists of two main parts: the downtown area with the city center, Spitztal, Lenzhalde and Brunnenhalde and the Heide area, which lies 100 m above the city on a hill to the northeast.

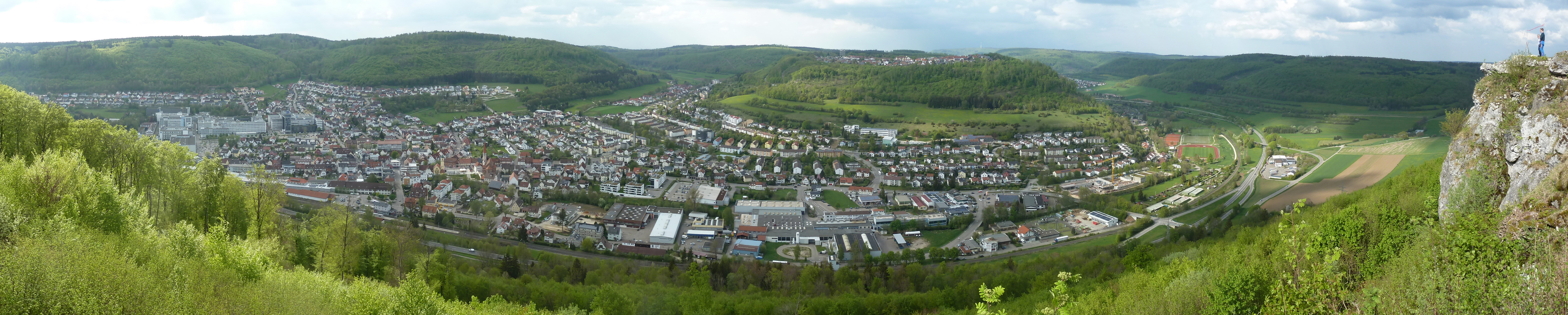
Panoramic view from the Rodstein (4 May 2022)

== History ==
=== Timeline ===
Year	Event
1137	first mentioning of the name "Cochon" in a table of goods of the Ellwangen Abbey
1147	first mentioning of the name "Kochen" in modern spelling
1337	first mentioning of the name "Oberkochen" in the table of goods of the Ellwangen Abbey
1343	first parish in Oberkochen
1535	a general set of village rules is formulated
1551	blast furnace is established on the source of the river Kocher
1578	Oberkochen gets a new detailed set of village rules
1582	until 1583. Construction and consecrating of the first Protestant church
1650	until around 1710. Arrival of Austrian settlers
1698	boundary description of the Oberkochen district
1725	oil mill on the "Ölweiher" (German for "oil pond")
1840	nearly 30 potters (German: "Hafner") are working in Oberkochen
1864	opening of the railway line Aalen-Ulm
1876	founding of the "Württembergische Holzbohrerfabrik A. Leitz" predecessor of the present-day "Leitz GmbH & Co. KG" in Oberkochen
1916	connection to the national water supply
1945	allied bombings of Oberkochen during World War II
1946	the company Carl Zeiss is relocated in Oberkochen after the partly emigration from Jena
1967	new town hall is opened
1968	Oberkochen officially becomes a city (June 29)
2006	The Carl Zeiss SMT opens a new factory with 2,500 employees in the intercommunal industrial area Oberkochen-Königsbronn

=== Schultheiß and mayors of Oberkochen ===
From 1553 until 25 February 1803 Oberkochen had two Schultheißen, one of the catholic Ellwangen and one of the Protestant würtembergian Königsbronn. Since 1933 Oberkochen has a mayor, who wears a livery collar since Oberkochen became a city in 1968. The collar was donated by trade, commerce, industry and liberal professions.

Year	Title	Name
1803	Schultheiß	Johann Sebastian Gold (Ellwangen) and Kaspar Scheerer (Württemberg)
1809	Schultheiß	Kaspar Scheerer (alone)
1830	Schultheiß	Sigmnund Jonathan Maier (also surgeon)
1849	Schultheiß	Michael Wingert (also master bricklayer)
1889	Schultheiß	Johannes Betzler
1901	Schultheiß	Alois Butscher
1903	Schultheiß	Franz Anton Bucher
1905	Schultheiß	Richard Frank
1933	mayor	Otto Heidenreich
1945	mayor	Richard Frank (same person as Schultheiß in 1905)
1946	mayor	Rudolf Eber
1948	mayor	Gustav Bosch
1977	mayor	Harald Gentsch
1993	mayor	Peter Traub
since 2026	mayor	Marcel Winter

=== Population ===
During the Thirty Years' War (1618–1648) the population of Oberkochen was reduced from c. 500 to c. 100 inhabitants. It took nearly 200 years to reach a population of 500 again. In the 19th century the population saw a greater rise due to the industrialisation.

The next remarkable growth took place after World War II, when the population quadrupled from 2,000 to 8,000 people in just 20 years. One of the main reasons for this growth was the relocation and expansion of the company Carl Zeiss. In 1968 Oberkochen became officially a city, which is remarkable, because at this time a population of 10,000 people was a condition for towns in Germany to become a city. The reason for the premature change in the status of Oberkochen was the intense growth of the population prior to 1968, which made the mayor Gustav Bosch, as well as the responsible authorities believe, that a population of 10,000 would be reached soon. Therefore, the change of the status of Oberkochen from town to city was applied for and finally granted. Despite these expectations and actions the population stalled instead and even saw a slight decrease.

Today, there are more commuters working in Oberkochen than working people living there.

Year	Population	Foreigners
1618	c. 500	n/a
1648	c. 100	n/a
1830	630	n/a
1880	1,202	n/a
1900	1,176	n/a
1925	1,512	n/a
1939	2,002	n/a
1950	3,681	n/a
1961	7,979	127
1970	8,648	360
1980	8,118	547
1990	8,446	682
1995	8,589	830
2000	8,271	764
2005	8,206	844
2008	8,040	859
2009	7,915	864
2010	7,816	856
2011	7,755	651
2012	7,815	713
2013	7,833	742

=== Coat of arms ===

The blazon of the coat of arms spells: "In blue three (2:1) golden roses." (German: "In Blau drei (2:1) goldene Rosen.")

The coat of arms was introduced in 1968 and is based on that of the "Görig von Kochen" from 1404. He owned several pieces of land in Oberkochen. The colours were chosen without historic meaning.

== Infrastructure ==
=== Transport ===
Oberkochen can be reached by using the Bundesstraße 19 ("B 19"), which runs along the Kocher-Brenz-Valley from north to south. Oberkochen has two junctions to the Bundesstraße, Oberkochen-North ("Oberkochen-Nord") and Oberkochen-South ("Oberkochen-Süd"). The nearest Autobahn is the Bundesautobahn 7 with the Aalen-Oberkochen-junction, which is reached via the B19 and L1084 after an 11 km drive from Oberkochen.

Oberkochen has no traffic lights. The traffic is mainly reglemented by the priority to the right rule, roundabouts and crosswalks.

By train Oberkochen is connected through the Brenz Railway, which is used by the Regional-Express of the DB Regio company. The nearest connection to national and international train services is made via the Aalen railroad station, which is 10 km away from Oberkochen and has a direct link to it. The railroad station of Oberkochen has two platforms and is friendly for disabled persons, i.e. people using wheelchairs, through an elevator. It is possible to buy tickets for the train on a ticket machine located on the platforms.

Oberkochen does not have an own airport. The nearest airport with regular national transportation is the Stuttgart Airport (IATA: STR, ICAO: EDDS) which is a 90 km drive by car away from Oberkochen.

=== Education ===
Oberkochen has three municipal and one Roman Catholic kindergarten. There is a Gemeinschaftsschule, the Dreißentalschule, which contains a primary school and a secondary school, where a Mittlere Reife can be awarded. There is a Förderschule, the Sonnenbergschule also. The local Gymnasium is the Ernst-Abbe-Gymnasium, named after the scientist Ernst Abbe. There also is a Musikschule (music school). Oberkochen has no university and the next university can be found in Aalen.

The local folk high school is located in the building of the city hall. For a wider set of courses there is also a folk high school in Aalen. The municipal library was installed in the old Protestant church. It contains 19.000 media volumes and faces over 40.000 check outs per year.

=== Sacred buildings ===
The St.-Peter-und-Paul-Kirche (German for: St. Peter and Paul Church) is the local Roman Catholic church and was consecrated October 25, 1900. This church was the replacement for an older church from the Baroque period.

The local Protestant church is the Versöhnungskirche (German for: Reconciliation Church), which was consecrated in 1968. The predecessor of this church became the local library.

Despite the growing Muslim community there is no mosque in Oberkochen. The nearest mosque can be found in Aalen.

== Economy ==
After World War II, the Allied troops moved parts of the Carl Zeiss Company in Jena to Oberkochen. Today, the headquarters of the Carl Zeiss AG are located in Oberkochen. Another important business is the Leitz company, which is the world-leading manufacturer for wood-processing tools.

== International relations ==
Oberkochen is twinned with:

- Dives-sur-Mer, France, since 1984
- Montebelluna, Italy, since 1992
- Mátészalka, Hungary, since 2008

== Honorary citizens ==
awarded	name	profession	born-died
1893	Karl Fröhner	head forester ("Oberförster")	1844-1898
1894	Franz Breitenbach	parson	1819-1900
1909	Emil Bucher	parson	1870-1949
1909	Carl Weiger	head forester ("Oberförster")	1843-1911
1953	Josef Schmid	manufacturer	1887-1960
1955	Albert Bäuerle	manufacturer	1901-1979
1968	Dr. Gerhard Kühn	member of the board of the company Carl Zeiss	1902-1990
1968	Dr. Heinz Küppenbender	member of the board of the company Carl Zeiss	1901-1989
1978	Gustav Bosch	mayor of Oberkochen	1914-1979
2001	Dr. Gert Littmann	member of the board of the company Carl Zeiss	1927-
2004	Dr. Dieter Brucklacher	entrepreneur	1939-
2010	Bruno Balle	merchant	1936-
2011	Dietrich Bantel	"Gymnasialprofessor a.D."	1935-
