= Carl Zeiss SMT =

Semiconductor company

Carl Zeiss SMT GmbH
- Type: GmbH (Germany)
- Industry: Semiconductor manufacturing technology
- Founded: 2001
- Headquarters: Oberkochen, Germany
- Key people: Frank Rohmund; Torsten Reitze
- Revenue: € 5.055 billion (2024/25)
- Number of employees: 9,349 (2025)
- Website: www.zeiss.com/semiconductor-manufacturing-technology/home.html

Carl Zeiss SMT GmbH comprises the semiconductor manufacturing technology (SMT) business group of ZEISS and develops and produces equipment for the manufacture of microchips. The company is majority owned by Carl Zeiss AG, with a 24.9% minority stake by ASML Holding.

The headquarters of the group are located in Oberkochen, Germany, with additional sites in the German cities Jena, Wetzlar, Rossdorf, Aachen, Coswig, Zurich (CH) Dublin (USA) and Bar Lev (Israel). In total, more than 8,349 employees work at these nine locations.

== History ==
In 1968, ZEISS supplied the optics for a circuit printer for the first time. About nine years later, the world's first predecessor to a modern wafer stepper, produced by David Mann (later GCA), was equipped with optics from Carl Zeiss. In 1983, the first lithography optics from ZEISS were used in a wafer stepper from Philips. Just under ten years later, ZEISS and Philips carve-out company ASML entered into a strategic partnership. The Semiconductor Manufacturing Technology business group was established by ZEISS in 1994. Carl Zeiss SMT GmbH and its subsidiaries Carl Zeiss Laser Optics GmbH and Carl Zeiss SMS GmbH followed in 2001. The construction of the Semiconductor Manufacturing Technology plant of ZEISS in Oberkochen started the same year, and was completed in 2006. In 2010, the semiconductor area achieved revenues of over a billion euros for the first time. Effective October 2014, the subsidiaries Carl Zeiss Laser Optics and Carl Zeiss SMS GmbH were merged into Carl Zeiss SMT GmbH. In 2016 ASML purchased a minority stake in Carl Zeiss SMT to strengthen their strategic partnership.

== Product areas ==
=== Semiconductor manufacturing optics ===
The ZEISS business group develops and produces optics for semiconductor production. Its core business is lithography optics that forms the centerpiece of a wafer scanner. The development and manufacture of projection optics and the development of illumination systems take place at the Oberkochen site, while the production of most types of illumination system is located in Wetzlar. In addition to lithography optics, the business group is specialized in numerous other optical products, including optical components for lasers that are used as light sources for lithographic systems.

Carl Zeiss SMT is currently working on a new generation of microchips using High-NA-EUV lithography, which enables light from a larger angular range to be used for imaging, allowing up to three times more structures to be imaged on a microchip.

=== Photomask systems ===
This area develops and manufactures systems that analyze and repair defects on photomasks and measure and optimize defined mask properties. The photomask contains all the structure information that will be imaged on the wafer with light.

=== Solutions for high-volume wafer manufacturing ===
This product line includes solutions for inspection, metrology, and defect analysis in logic and memory chip manufacturing, including chiplet production (see Advanced packaging). The technologies used include, among others, three-dimensional X-ray analysis, multi-beam electron beam inspection, and FIB-SEM-based three-dimensional imaging techniques. These solutions support the monitoring and optimization of microstructures in the nanometer range, general material properties, and material defects in state-of-the-art chips and chiplets, thereby contributing to ensuring yield and reliability in semiconductor manufacturing.
