= Everhart–Thornley detector =

Physics

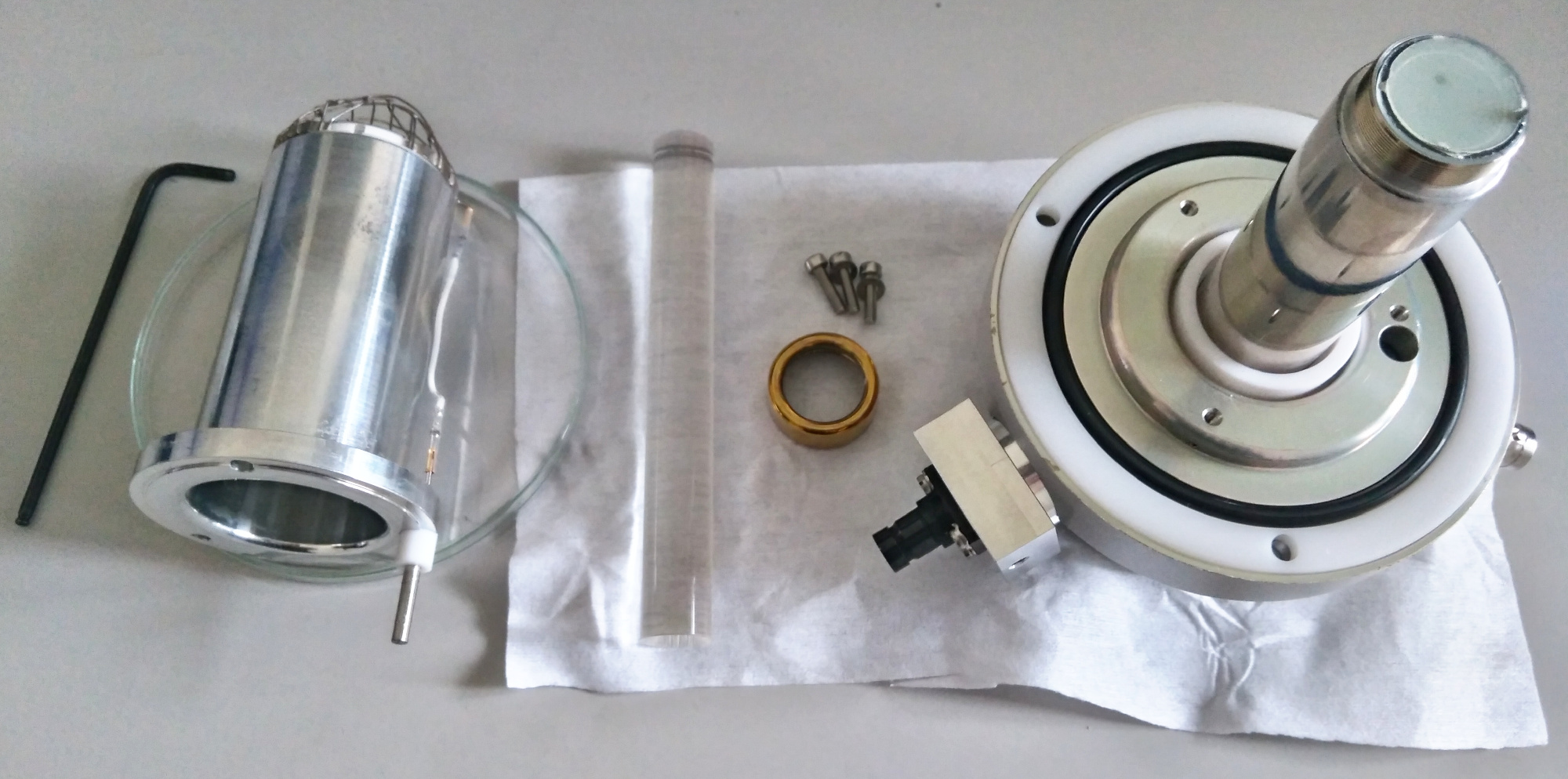
Disassembled Everhart-Thornley detector from (Philips XL30), showing (from left) the +300V grid and tube, transparent cylindrical light guide, golden clamping nut, and the internal assembly with scintillator disc (+10 kV) on the top. A common photomultiplier would be on the rear side of light guide and is not shown.

The Everhart–Thornley detector (E–T detector or ET detector) is a secondary electron and back-scattered electron detector used in scanning electron microscopes (SEMs). It is named after its designers, Thomas E. Everhart and Richard F. M. Thornley, who in 1960 published their design to increase the efficiency of existing secondary electron detectors by adding a light pipe to carry the photon signal from the scintillator inside the evacuated specimen chamber of the SEM to the photomultiplier outside the chamber. Prior to this Everhart had improved a design for a secondary electron detection by Vladimir Zworykin and Jan A. Rajchman by changing the electron multiplier to a photomultiplier. The Everhart–Thornley Detector with its lightguide and highly efficient photomultiplier is the most frequently used detector in SEMs.

The detector consists primarily of a scintillator inside a Faraday cage inside the specimen chamber of the microscope. A low positive voltage is applied to the Faraday cage to attract the relatively low energy (less than 50 eV by definition) secondary electrons. Other electrons within the specimen chamber are not attracted by this low voltage and will only reach the detector if their direction of travel takes them to it. The scintillator has a high positive voltage (in the nature of 10,000 V) to accelerate the incoming electrons to it where they can be converted to light photons. The direction of their travel is focused to the lightguide by a metal coating on the scintillator acting as a mirror. In the light pipe the photons travel outside of the microscope's vacuum chamber to a photomultiplier tube for amplification.

The E-T secondary electron detector can be used in the SEM's back-scattered electron mode by either turning off the Faraday cage or by applying a negative voltage to the Faraday cage. However, better back-scattered electron images come from dedicated BSE detectors rather than from using the E–T detector as a BSE detector.
