= Prober =

A prober is someone who asks questions. It may also refer to:

== Technology ==
- Electron beam prober
- Laser voltage prober
- Time resolved photon emission prober
- Wafer prober

== Surname ==
- Suzanne Mary Prober
