= Zircon =

Zirconium silicate mineral

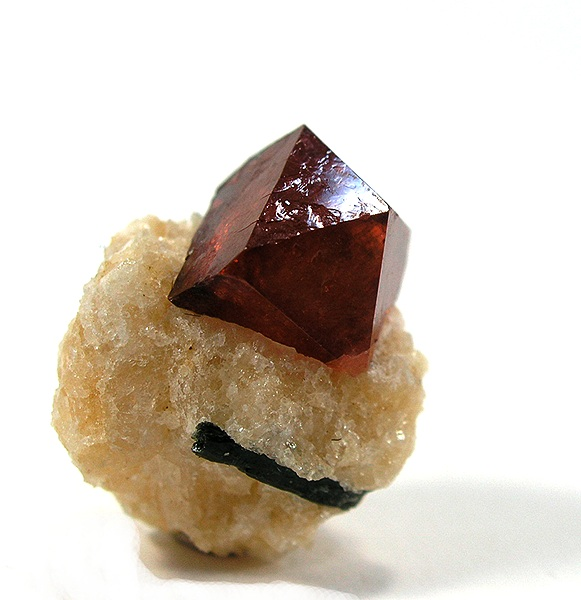
- A lustrous crystal of zircon perched on a tan matrix of calcite from the Gilgit District of Pakistan

General
- Category: Nesosilicates
- Formula: zirconium silicate (ZrSiO_{4})
- IMA symbol: Zrn
- Strunz classification: 9.AD.30
- Crystal system: Tetragonal
- Crystal class: Ditetragonal dipyramidal (4/mmm); H-M symbol: (4/m 2/m 2/m)
- Space group: I4_{1}/amd (No. 141)
- Unit cell: a = 6.607(1), c = 5.982(1) [Å]; Z = 4

Identification
- Color: Reddish brown, yellow, green, blue, gray, colorless; in thin section, colorless to pale brown
- Crystal habit: tabular to prismatic crystals, irregular grains, massive
- Twinning: On {101}. Crystals shocked by meteorite impact show polysynthetic twins on {112}
- Cleavage: {110} and {111}
- Fracture: Conchoidal to uneven
- Tenacity: Brittle
- Mohs scale hardness: 7.5
- Luster: Vitreous to adamantine; greasy when metamict.
- Streak: White
- Diaphaneity: Transparent to opaque
- Specific gravity: 4.6–4.7
- Optical properties: Uniaxial (+)
- Refractive index: n_{ω} = 1.925–1.961 n_{ε} = 1.980–2.015, 1.75 when metamict
- Birefringence: δ = 0.047–0.055
- Pleochroism: Weak
- Fusibility: close to 2,550 °C depend on Hf,Th,U,H,etc... concentrations.
- Solubility: Insoluble
- Other characteristics: Fluorescent and radioactive, May form pleochroic halos, Relief: high

Zircon (/ˈzɜːrkɒn, -kən/) is a mineral belonging to the group of nesosilicates and is a source of the metal zirconium. Its chemical name is zirconium(IV) silicate, and its corresponding chemical formula is ZrSiO_{4}. An empirical formula showing some of the range of substitution in zircon is (Zr_{1–y}, REE_{y})(SiO_{4})_{1–x}(OH)_{4x–y}. Zircon precipitates from silicate melts and has relatively high concentrations of high field strength incompatible elements. For example, hafnium is almost always present in quantities ranging from 1 to 4%. The crystal structure of zircon is tetragonal crystal system. The natural color of zircon varies between colorless, yellow-golden, red, brown, blue, and green.

The name derives from the Persian zargun, meaning "gold-hued". This word is changed into "jargoon", a term applied to light-colored zircons. The English word "zircon" is derived from Zirkon, which is the German adaptation of this word. Yellow, orange, and red zircon is also known as "hyacinth", from the flower hyacinthus, whose name is of Ancient Greek origin.

== Properties ==
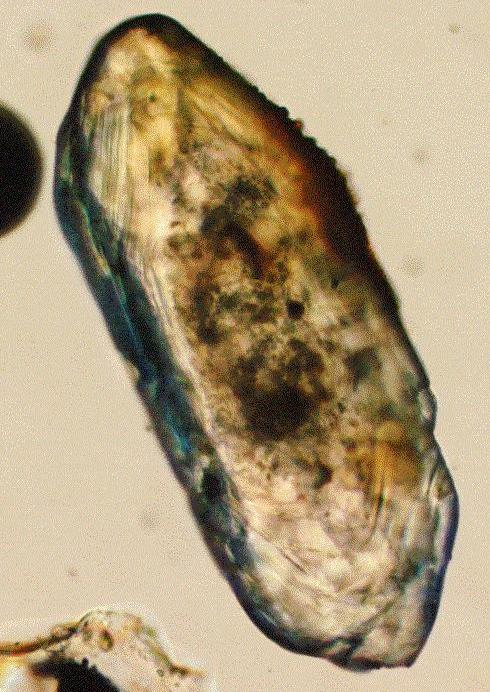
Optical microscope photograph; the length of the crystal is about 250 μm

Zircon is common in the crust of Earth. It occurs as a common accessory mineral in igneous rocks (as primary crystallization products), in metamorphic rocks and as detrital grains in sedimentary rocks. Large zircon crystals are rare. Their average size in granite rocks is about 0.1–0.3 mm (0.0039–0.0118 in), but they can also grow to sizes of several cm, especially in mafic pegmatites and carbonatites. Zircon is fairly hard (with a Mohs hardness of 7.5) and chemically stable, and so is highly resistant to weathering. It also is resistant to heat, so that detrital zircon grains are sometimes preserved in igneous rocks formed from melted sediments. Its resistance to weathering, together with its relatively high specific gravity (4.68), make it an important component of the heavy mineral fraction of sandstones.

Because of their uranium and thorium content, some zircons undergo metamictization. Connected to internal radiation damage, these processes partially disrupt the crystal structure and partly explain the highly variable properties of zircon. As zircon becomes more and more modified by internal radiation damage, the density decreases, the crystal structure is compromised, and the color changes.

Zircon occurs in many colors, including reddish brown, yellow, green, blue, gray, and colorless. The color of zircons can sometimes be changed by heat treatment. Common brown zircons can be transformed into colorless and blue zircons by heating to 800 to 1,000 °C (1,470 to 1,830 °F). In geological settings, the development of pink, red, and purple zircon occurs after hundreds of millions of years, if the crystal has sufficient trace elements to produce color centers. Color in this red or pink series is annealed in geological conditions above temperatures of around 400 °C (752 °F).

Structurally, zircon consists of parallel chains of alternating silica tetrahedra (silicon ions in fourfold coordination with oxygen ions) and zirconium ions, with the large zirconium ions in eightfold coordination with oxygen ions.

== Applications ==
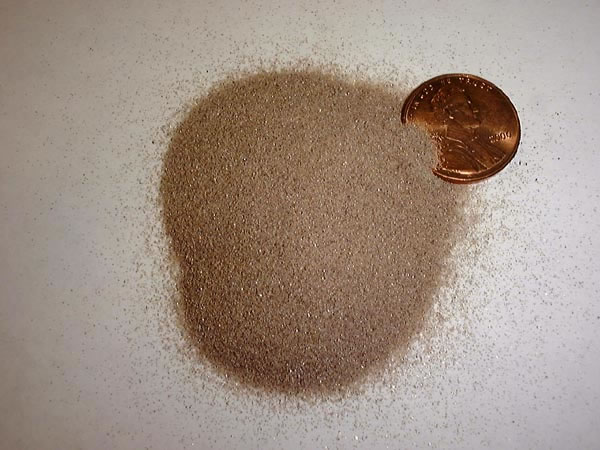
Sand-sized grains of zircon

Zircon is mainly consumed as an opacifier, and has been known to be used in the decorative ceramics industry.

It is also the principal precursor not only to metallic zirconium, although this application is small, but also to all compounds of zirconium including zirconium dioxide (ZrO_{2}), an important refractory oxide with a melting point of 2,717 °C (4,923 °F).

Other applications include use in refractories and foundry casting and a growing array of specialty applications as zirconia and zirconium chemicals, including in nuclear fuel rods, catalytic fuel converters and in water and air purification systems.

Ford Motor Company used a sand casting method known as the Cosworth Casting Method for the cylinder heads of its Duratec V6 engine. The process, developed by noted scientist John Campbell used zircon as its casting aggregate to improve material uniformity and create dimensional accuracy, high strength, and a dense, low- or no-porosity structure.

Zircon is one of the key minerals used by geologists for geochronology.

Zircon is a part of the ZTR index to classify highly-weathered sediments.

== Gemstone ==
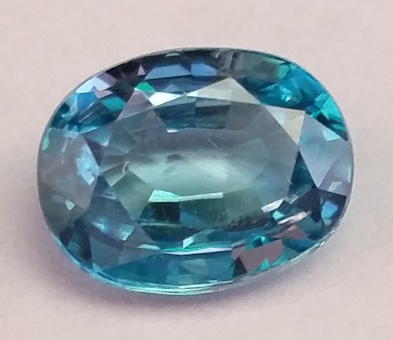
A pale blue zircon gemstone weighing 3.36 carats

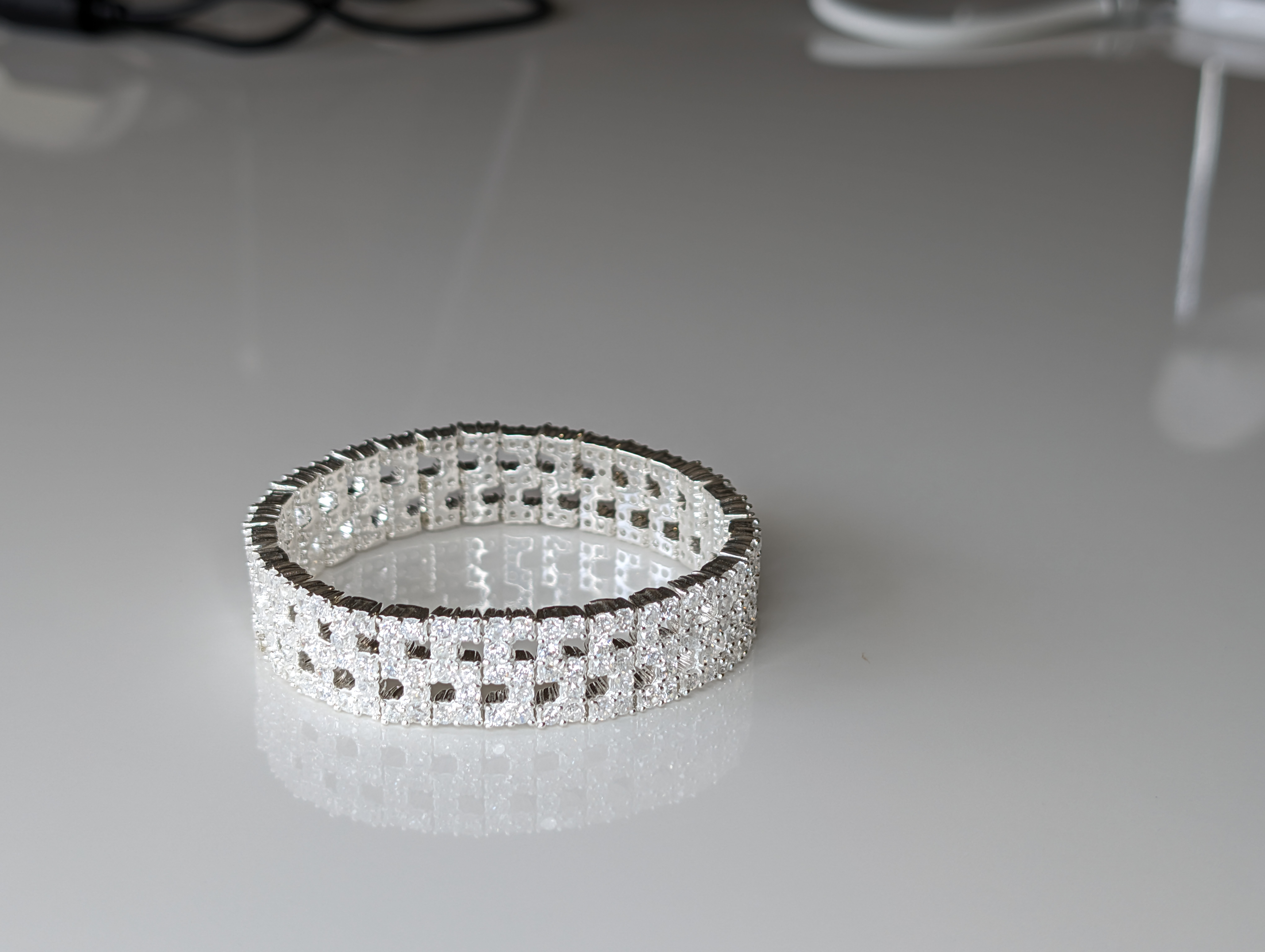
This bracelet has zircon gemstones. The metal is zinc alloy base with silver coating.

Transparent zircon is a well-known form of semi-precious gemstone, favored for its high specific gravity (between 4.2 and 4.86) and adamantine luster. Because of its high refractive index (1.92) it has sometimes been used as a substitute for diamond, though it does not display quite the same play of color as a diamond. Zircon is one of the heaviest types of gemstone. Its Mohs hardness is between that of quartz and topaz, at 7.5 on the 10 point scale, though below that of the similar manmade stone cubic zirconia (8-8.5). Zircons may sometimes lose their inherent color after long exposure to bright sunlight, which is unusual in a gemstone. It is immune to acid attack except by sulfuric acid and then only when ground into a fine powder.

Most gem-grade zircons show a high degree of birefringence which, on stones cut with a table and pavilion cuts (i.e., nearly all cut stones), can be seen as the apparent doubling-up of the latter when viewed through the former, and this characteristic can be used to distinguish them from diamonds and cubic zirconias (CZ) as well as soda-lime glass, none of which show this characteristic. However, some zircons from Sri Lanka display only weak or no birefringence at all, and some other Sri Lanka stones may show clear birefringence in one place and little or none in another part of the same cut stone. Other gemstones also display birefringence, so while the presence of this characteristic may help distinguish a given zircon from a diamond or a CZ, it will not help distinguish it from, for example, a topaz gemstone. The high specific gravity of zircon, however, can usually separate it from any other gem and is simple to test.

Also, birefringence depends on the cut of the stone in relation to its optical axis. If a zircon is cut with this axis perpendicular to its table, birefringence may be reduced to undetectable levels unless viewed with a jeweler's loupe or other magnifying optics. The highest grade zircons are cut to minimize birefringence.

The value of a zircon gem depends largely on its color, clarity, and size. Prior to World War II, blue zircons (the most valuable color) were available from many gemstone suppliers in sizes between 15 and 25 carats; since then, stones even as large as 10 carats have become very scarce, especially in the most desirable color varieties.

Synthetic zircons have been created in laboratories. They are occasionally used in jewellery such as earrings. Zircons are sometimes imitated by spinel and synthetic sapphire, but are not difficult to distinguish from them with simple tools.

Zircon from Ratanakiri province in Cambodia is heat treated to produce blue zircon gemstones, sometimes referred to by the trade name cambolite.

In 2024, the Australian gemstone firm NYBlue announced their plans to establish control over the global blue zircon market by securing a substantial portion of the world's supply. The company reported an inventory exceeding one million carats of raw and faceted stones, citing recent mine closures in Cambodia as a factor in the gemstone's increasing scarcity.

== Occurrence ==
World production trend of zirconium mineral concentrates

Zircon is a common accessory to trace mineral constituent of all kinds of igneous rocks, but particularly granite and felsic igneous rocks. Due to its hardness, durability and chemical inertness, zircon persists in sedimentary deposits and is a common constituent of most sands. Zircon can occasionally be found as a trace mineral in ultrapotassic igneous rocks such as kimberlites, carbonatites, and lamprophyre, owing to the unusual magma genesis of these rocks.

Zircon forms economic concentrations within heavy mineral sands ore deposits, within certain pegmatites, and within some rare alkaline volcanic rocks (for example the Toongi Trachyte in Dubbo, Australia) in association with the zirconium-hafnium minerals eudialyte and armstrongite.

Australia leads the world in zircon mining, producing 37% of the world total and accounting for 40% of world EDR (economic demonstrated resources) for the mineral. The largest zircon mine in the world, Jacinth-Ambrosia, produces around 25 per cent of the global supply of zircon.

South Africa is Africa's main producer, with 30% of world production, second after Australia.

== Radiometric dating ==
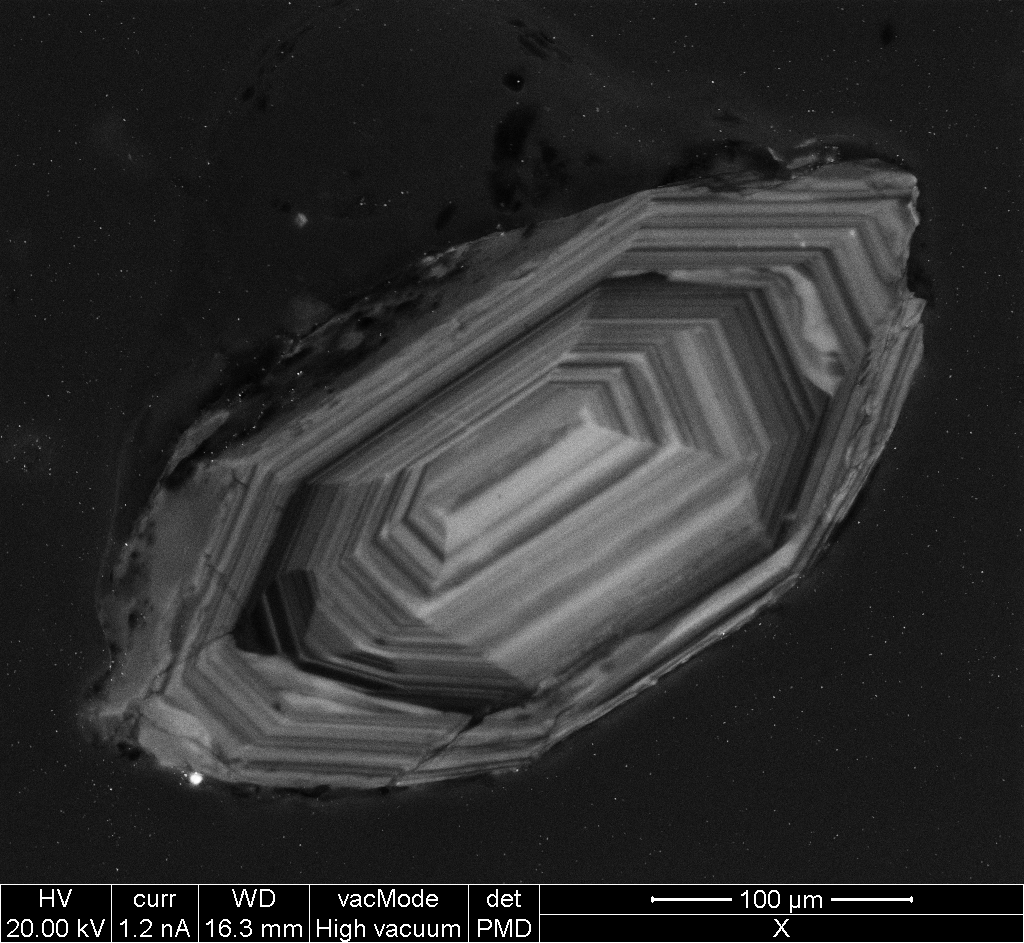
SEM-CL image of Zircon grain showing zonations and poly-cycles (core-rim structure)

Zircon has played an important role during the evolution of radiometric dating. Zircons contain trace amounts of uranium and thorium (from 10 ppm up to 1 wt%) and can be dated using several modern analytical techniques. Because zircons can survive geologic processes like erosion, transport, and even high-grade metamorphism, they contain a rich and varied record of geological processes. Currently, zircons are typically dated by uranium–lead (U–Pb), fission-track, and U+Th/He techniques. Imaging the cathodoluminescence emission from fast electrons can be used as a prescreening tool for high-resolution secondary-ion mass spectrometry (SIMS) to image the zonation pattern and identify regions of interest for isotope analysis. This is done using an integrated cathodoluminescence and scanning electron microscope. Zircons in sedimentary rock can identify the sediment source.

Zircons from Jack Hills in the Narryer Gneiss terrane, Yilgarn craton, Western Australia, have yielded U–Pb ages up to 4.404 billion years, interpreted to be the age of crystallization, making them the oldest minerals so far dated on Earth. In addition, the oxygen isotopic compositions of some of these zircons have been interpreted to indicate that more than 4.3 billion years ago there was already liquid water on the surface of the Earth. This interpretation is supported by additional trace element data, but is also the subject of debate. In 2015, "remains of biotic life" were found in 4.1-billion-year-old rocks in the Jack Hills of Western Australia. According to one of the researchers, "If life arose relatively quickly on Earth ... then it could be common in the universe."

== Similar minerals ==
Hafnon (HfSiO_{4}), xenotime (YPO_{4}), béhierite, schiavinatoite ((Ta,Nb)BO_{4}), thorite (ThSiO_{4}), and coffinite (USiO_{4}) all share the same crystal structure (^{IV}X ^{IV}Y O_{4}, ^{III}X ^{V}Y O_{4} in the case of xenotime) as zircon.

== Gallery ==
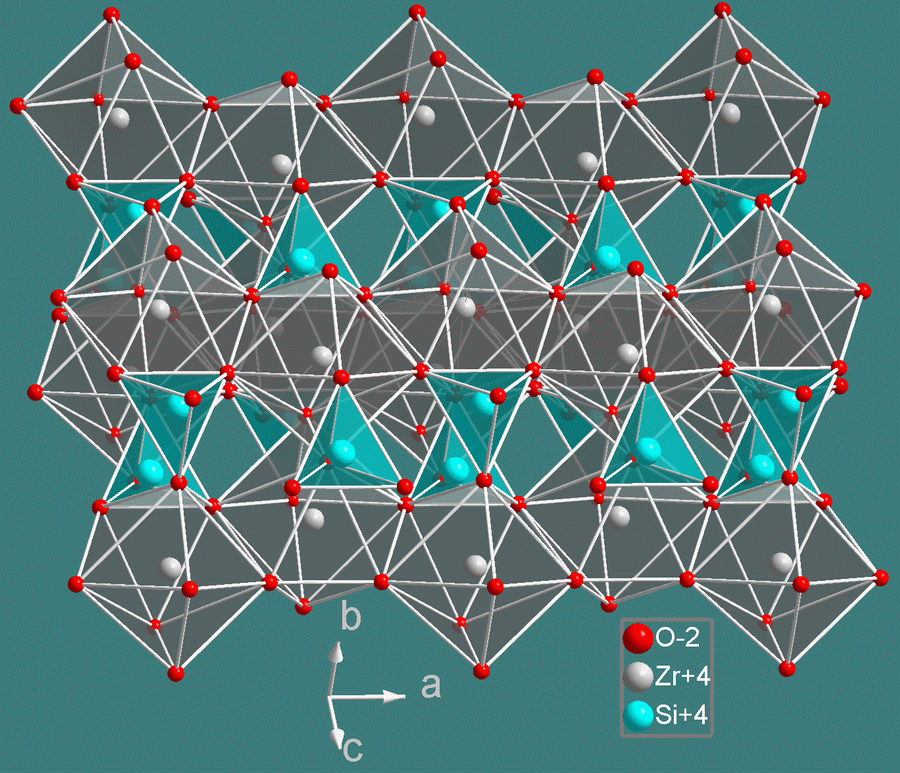
Crystal structure of zircon

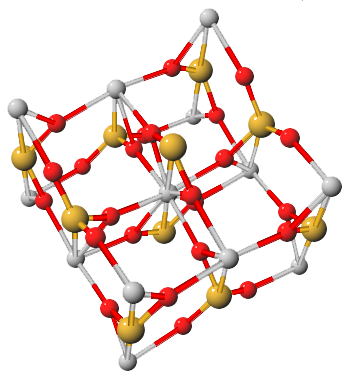
Unit cell of zircon

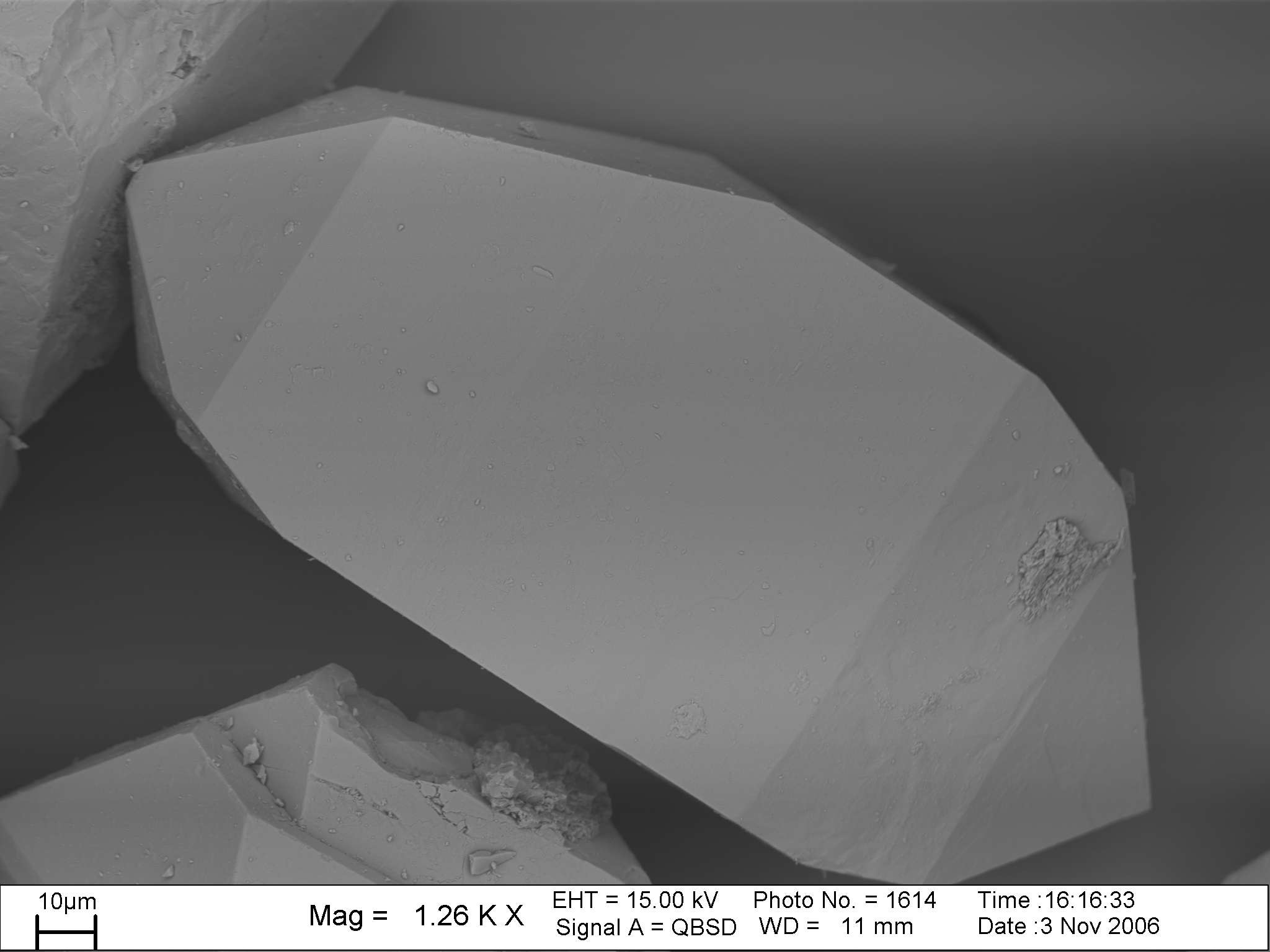
Scanning electron microscope image of zircon

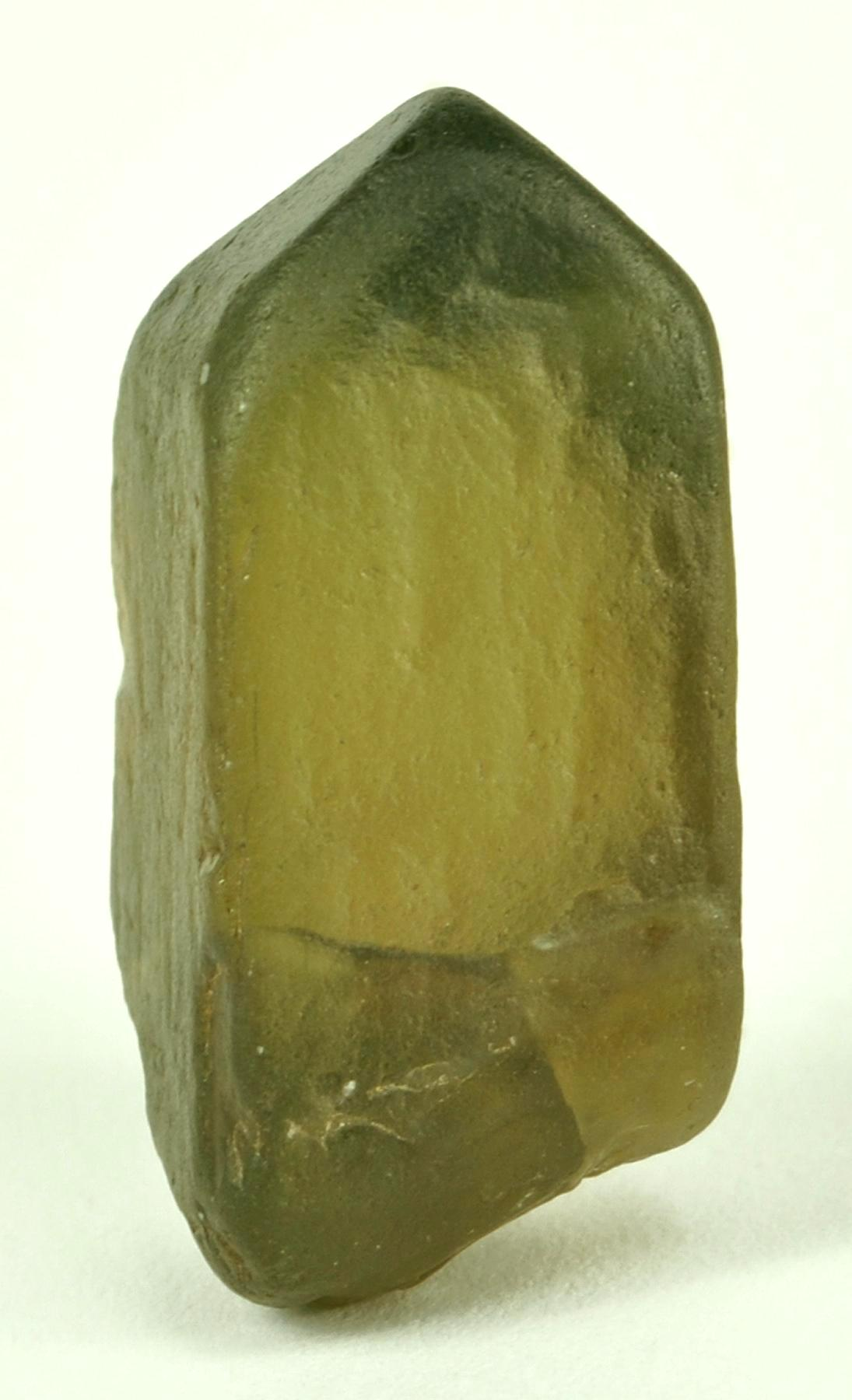
Unusual olive-green zircon

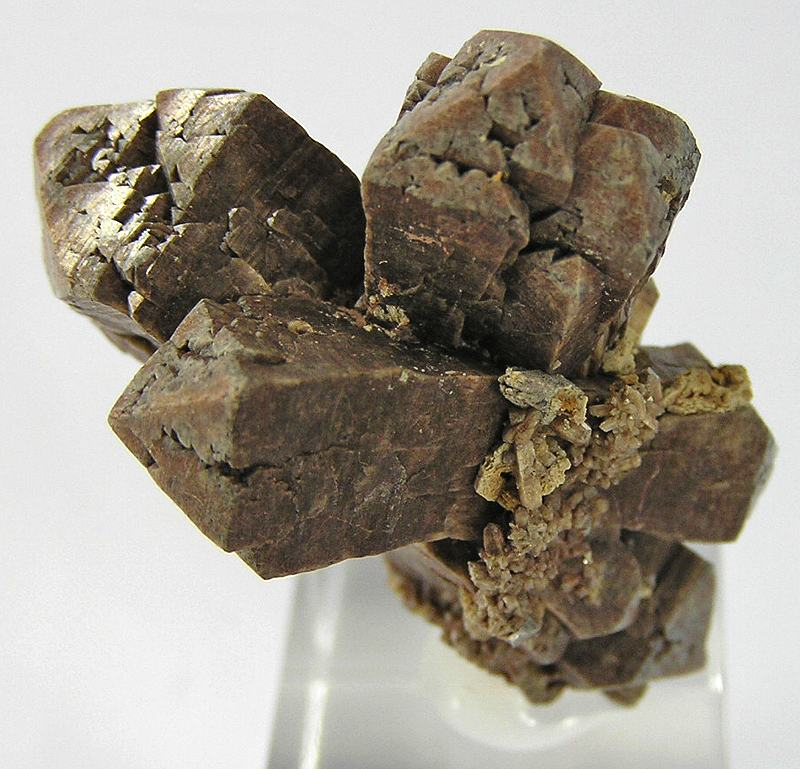
Cluster of three compound crystals of zircon

== See also ==
- Baddeleyite, ZrO_{2}
- Cathodoluminescence microscope
- Cool Early Earth
- Earliest known life forms
- Hadean zircon
- Heavy mineral sands ore deposits
- History of Earth
- Ilmenite
- Cerium anomaly
