= CIVA =

CIVA may refer to:

- Charge induced voltage alteration a technique which uses a scanning electron microscope to locate open conductors on CMOS integrated circuits
- CIVA-TV, a television transmitter in Canada which airs the Télé-Québec program schedule
- Fédération Aéronautique Internationale Aerobatics Commission, also known as the "Commission Internationale de Voltige Aerienne"
- C.I.V.A, a South Korean girl group
- Christians In The Visual Arts - an American visual arts organization which worked to enhance and explore the relationship between Christian faith and the visual arts (1979-2023).
- CIVA, Belgian architecture centre
