= Decap =

Decap may refer to:

- Decapsulation machinery, a type of Sample preparation equipment
- Decapitation – Complete separation of the head from the body
- Decapping – Removing the protective cover of an integrated circuit
