= TRPE =

TRPE may refer to:

- Time-resolved photon emission
- Anthranilate synthase, an enzyme
