= Nanoprobe (device) =

Optical device for nano-scale imaging

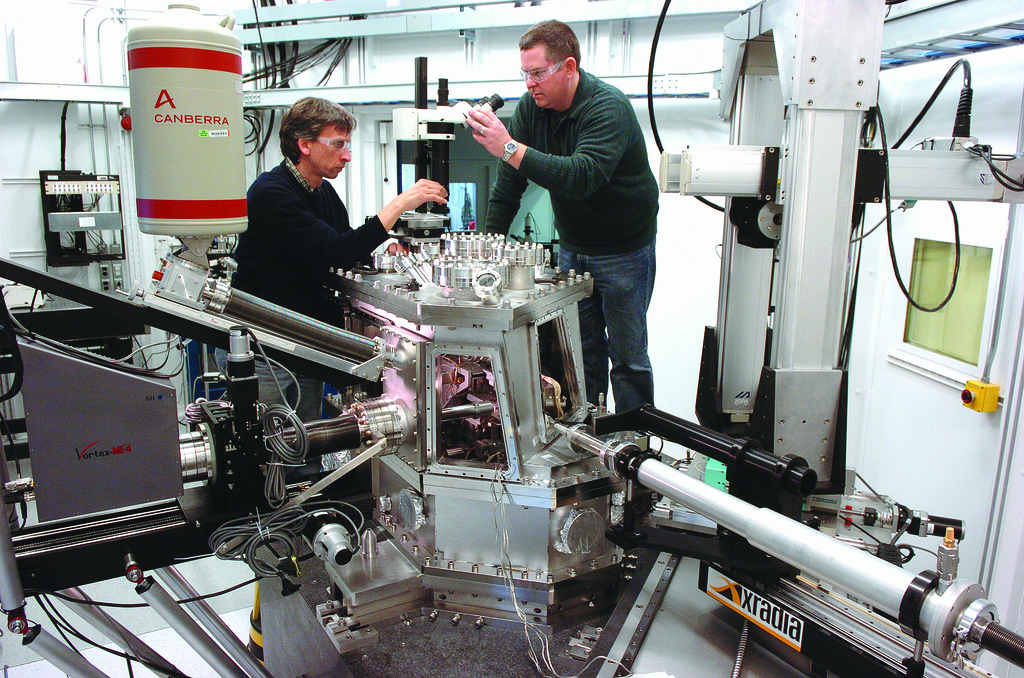
Nanoprobe at the Advanced Photon Source, Argonne National Laboratory.

A nanoprobe refers to one of several different kinds of devices:

- In semiconductor manufacturing, nanoprobes are devices for carrying out failure analysis and debugging of integrated circuits, as well as for transistor design, circuit design, and process development, and yield engineering. This technique is called nanoprobing.
- In bioimaging, nanoprobes are optical devices that provide contrast and spatial resolution at the nanoscale.
- Nanoprobes may also refer to other chemical or biological devices that introduce or extract substances measured in nanoliters or nanograms rather than microliters or micrograms.

== Nanoprobes in semiconductor manufacturing ==
In semiconductor manufacturing, nanoprobes are used to carry out failure analysis and debugging of integrated circuits, as well as for transistor design, circuit, process development, and yield engineering. Nanoprobes for this application (called nanoprobing) are usually made of tungsten wires sharpened at their tips to radii of curvature as small as 3 nm. Nanoprobes are positioned through the use of an electron microscope and a manipulator to contact two or more points on the surface of an integrated circuit (much like the contacts in a volt-ohmmeter), and the currents or voltage drops between them are measured with an external instrument called a nanoprober.

== Optical nanoprobes ==
Nanoprobes can be used in bioimaging to provide improved contrast and spatial resolution of cells and tissues. Types of nanoprobes used for bioimaging include fluorescence, chemiluminescence, and photoacoustic imaging. Metal nanoparticles have been used as nanoprobes to enhance the sensitivity of surface-enhanced Raman scattering in a variety of applications.

== Other uses ==
The term nanoprobe also refers more generically to any chemical or biological device that introduces or extracts substances measured in nanoliters or nanograms rather than microliters or micrograms. For example:

- Introducing nanoparticles in aqueous solution to serve as nanoprobes in electrospray ionization mass spectrometry
- Extracting nanoquantities of neurochemicals via in vivo microdialysis
- Using gold-based metallic nanoprobes for theranostics (therapeutic diagnostics)

== See also ==
- Nanotechnology
- Nanomedicine
