= Thermal laser stimulation =

Defect imaging technique class

Thermal laser stimulation represents a class of defect imaging techniques which employ a laser to produce a thermal variation in a semiconductor device. This technique may be used for semiconductor failure analysis. There are four techniques associated with thermal laser stimulation: optical beam induced resistance change (OBIRCH), thermally induced voltage alteration (TIVA)), external induced voltage alteration (XIVA) and Seebeck effect imaging (SEI)

== Optical beam induced resistance change ==
Optical beam induced resistance change (OBIRCH) is an imaging technique which uses a laser beam to induce a thermal change in the device. Laser stimulation highlights differences in thermal characteristics between areas containing defects and areas which are defect-free. As the laser locally heats a defective area on a metal line which is carrying a current, the resulting resistance changes can be detected by monitoring the input current to the device. OBIRCH is useful for detecting electromigration effects resulting in open metal lines.

A constant voltage is applied to the device-under-test (DUT). An area of interest is selected on the device, and a laser beam is used to scan the area. The input current being drawn by the device is monitored for changes during this process. When a change in current is noted, the position of the laser at the time that the change occurred is marked on the image of the device.

When the laser beam strikes a location which does not contain a void, good thermal transmission exists and the change in electrical resistance is small. In areas containing voids, however, thermal transmission is impeded, resulting in a larger change in resistance. The degree of resistance change is displayed visually on an image of the device, with areas of higher resistance being displayed as bright spots.

== Thermally induced voltage alteration ==
Thermally induced voltage alteration (TIVA) is an imaging technique which uses a laser beam to pinpoint the location of electrical shorts on a device. The laser induces local thermal gradients in the device, which result in changes to the amount of power that the device uses.

A laser is scanned over the surface of the device while it is under electrical bias. The device is biased using a constant current source, and the power supply pin voltage is monitored for changes. When the laser strikes an area containing a short circuit, localized heating occurs. This heating changes the resistance of the short, resulting in a change in power consumption of the device. These changes in power consumption are plotted onto an image of the device in locations corresponding to the position of the laser at the time that the change was detected.

== External induced voltage alteration ==
External induced voltage alteration (XIVA) maintains a constant voltage bias and constant current sensing on the device under test. When the scanning laser passes over a defective location, a sudden change in impedance is created. This would normally result in a change in current, however, the constant current choke prevents this from happening. The detection of these events allows the position of the defect to be determined.

== Seebeck effect imaging ==
Seebeck effect imaging (SEI) uses a laser to generate thermal gradients in conductors. The thermal gradients induced generate corresponding electric potential gradients. This correlation of thermal and electric gradients is known as the Seebeck effect. The SEI technique is used to locate electrically floating conductors.

When the laser changes the thermal gradient of a floating conductor, its electrical potential changes. This change in potential will change the bias of any transistors connected to the floating conductor, which affects the heat dissipation of the device. These changes are mapped to a visual image of the device in order to physically locate the floating conductors.

== Key extraction ==
A proof-of-concept experiment was conducted at the University of Florida which demonstrated the possibility of using thermal laser stimulation to peer into SRAM chips and extract sensitive information.

== See also ==
- List of laser articles
