= Schiavinatoite =

Borate mineral

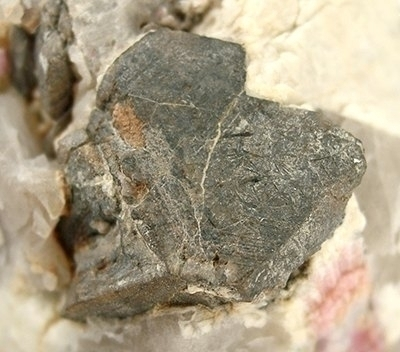

General
- Category: Borate mineral
- Formula: NbBO_{4}
- IMA symbol: Shv
- Strunz classification: 6.AC.15
- Crystal system: Tetragonal
- Crystal class: Ditetragonal dipyramidal (4/mmm); H-M symbol: (4/m 2/m 2/m)
- Space group: I4_{1}/amd
- Unit cell: a = 6.22, c = 5.49 [Å] (approximated); Z = 4

Identification
- Color: Colorless
- Crystal habit: zones of prismatic dipyramidal crystals (intergrown with béhierite)
- Mohs scale hardness: 8
- Luster: Vitreous
- Streak: White
- Density: 6.55
- Optical properties: Uniaxial (+)
- Refractive index: n=2.30
- Birefringence: Yes

Schiavinatoite is a very rare borate mineral, and the niobium endmember of a (Nb,Ta)BO_{4} solid solution formed with béhierite.

Schiavinatoite is classified as monoborate. It contains tetrahedral borate anion instead of planar BO_{3} group, which is more common among minerals. Schiavinatoite is one of the most simple niobium minerals. Both minerals possess zircon-type structure (tetragonal, space group I4_{1}/amd) and occur in pegmatites. Schiavinatoite and nioboholtite are minerals with essential niobium and boron.

== Occurrence and association ==
Schiavinatoite was detected in miaroles of a pegmatite at Antsongombato, Madagascar. It coexists with an apatite-group mineral, béhierite, danburite, elbaite–liddicoatite, feldspar, pollucite, quartz, rhodizite, and spodumene.

== Crystal structure ==
The main facts about schiavinatoite's structure:

- isostructural with zircon
- niobium coordination number of 8 (coordination polyhedron is distorted triangular dodecahedron)
- tetrahedrally-coordinated boron
- chains of edge-sharing BO_{4} and NbO_{8} polyhedra, parallel to [001]
- edge-sharing dodecahedra link the chains
