= Nanoprobe =

Nanoprobe can mean:

- Nanoprobe (device), real devices for seeing very small objects
- A fictional device used by the Borg (Star Trek)
