= Light-induced voltage alteration =

Semiconductor analysis technique

Light-induced voltage alteration (LIVA) is a semiconductor analysis technique that uses a laser or infrared light source to induce voltage changes in a device while scanning the beam of light across its surface. The technique relies upon the generation of electron-hole pairs in the semiconductor material when exposed to photons.

== Theory of operation ==
The device to be analyzed is biased using a constant current power supply. As the light source is scanned across the surface of the silicon, electron-hole pairs are generated. This causes subtle alterations of the operating characteristics of the device, which may result in slight changes to the power supply voltage. Any changes that are detected in the power supply voltage are noted and correlated with the position of the light source on the device. This allows the physical locations corresponding to power supply fluctuations to be mapped onto an image of the device. This provides the device analyst with specific locations at which the device may be examined for defects.
