= Sandra Bowden =

American artist

- Born: 1943 (age 82–83)
- Education: State University of New York
- Movement: Christians in the Visual Arts

Sandra Bowden (born 1943) is an artist and painter from New York City and was president from 1993 to 2007, of "Christians in the Visual Arts".

== Life ==
A native of Massachusetts, Bowden holds a degree from the State University of New York.

== Work ==
In her Gilded collection, Bowen reinterprets Marian art of the Renaissance.

Her work is in the permanent collection of the Vatican Museum of Contemporary Religious Art in Rome and in the Haifa Museum of Art in Israel. Corporate collections include Holiday Inns of America and the General Electric Corporation.

== Books ==
- The Art of Sandra Bowden by James Romaine (Square Halo Books, 2005) ISBN 978-0-9658798-9-7
- Editor of Faith and Vision: Twenty-Five Years of Christians in the Visual Arts (Square Halo Books, 2005) ISBN 978-0-9658798-8-0
- Contributor to It Was Good: Making Art to the Glory of God edited by Ned Bustard (Square Halo Books, 2007) ISBN 978-0-9785097-1-2
