= Electron beam prober =

The electron beam prober (e-beam prober) is a specialized adaptation of a standard scanning electron microscope (SEM) that is used for semiconductor failure analysis. While a conventional SEM may be operated in a voltage range of 10–30 keV, the e-beam Prober typically operates at 1 keV. The e-beam prober is capable of measuring voltage and timing waveforms on internal semiconductor signal structures. Waveforms may be measured on metal line, polysilicon and diffusion structures that have an electrically active, changing signal. The operation of the prober is similar to that of a sampling oscilloscope. A continuously looping, repeating test pattern must be applied to the device-under-test (DUT). E-beam probers are used primarily for front side semiconductor analysis. With the advent of flip-chip technology, many e-beam probers have been replaced with back side analysis instruments.

== Theory of operation ==
The e-beam prober generates an SEM image by raster-scanning a focused electron beam over a selected region of the semiconductor surface. The high energy electrons in the primary beam strike the surface of the silicon, producing a number of low energy secondary electrons. The secondary electrons are guided back up through the SEM column to a detector. The varying numbers of secondary electrons reaching the detector are interpreted to produce the SEM image.

During waveform acquisition mode, the primary electron beam is focused on a single point on the device surface. As the DUT cycles through its test pattern, the signal at the point being probed changes. The signal changes produce a corresponding change in the local electric field surrounding the point being probed. This affects the number of secondary electrons that escape the device surface and reach the detector. Since electrons are negatively charged, a conductor at a +5 volt potential inhibits the escape of electrons, while a 0 volt potential allows a greater number of electrons to reach the detector. By monitoring these changes in potential, a voltage and timing waveform may be produced for the signal at the point being probed.
