= Cathodoluminescence =

Photon emission under the impact of an electron beam

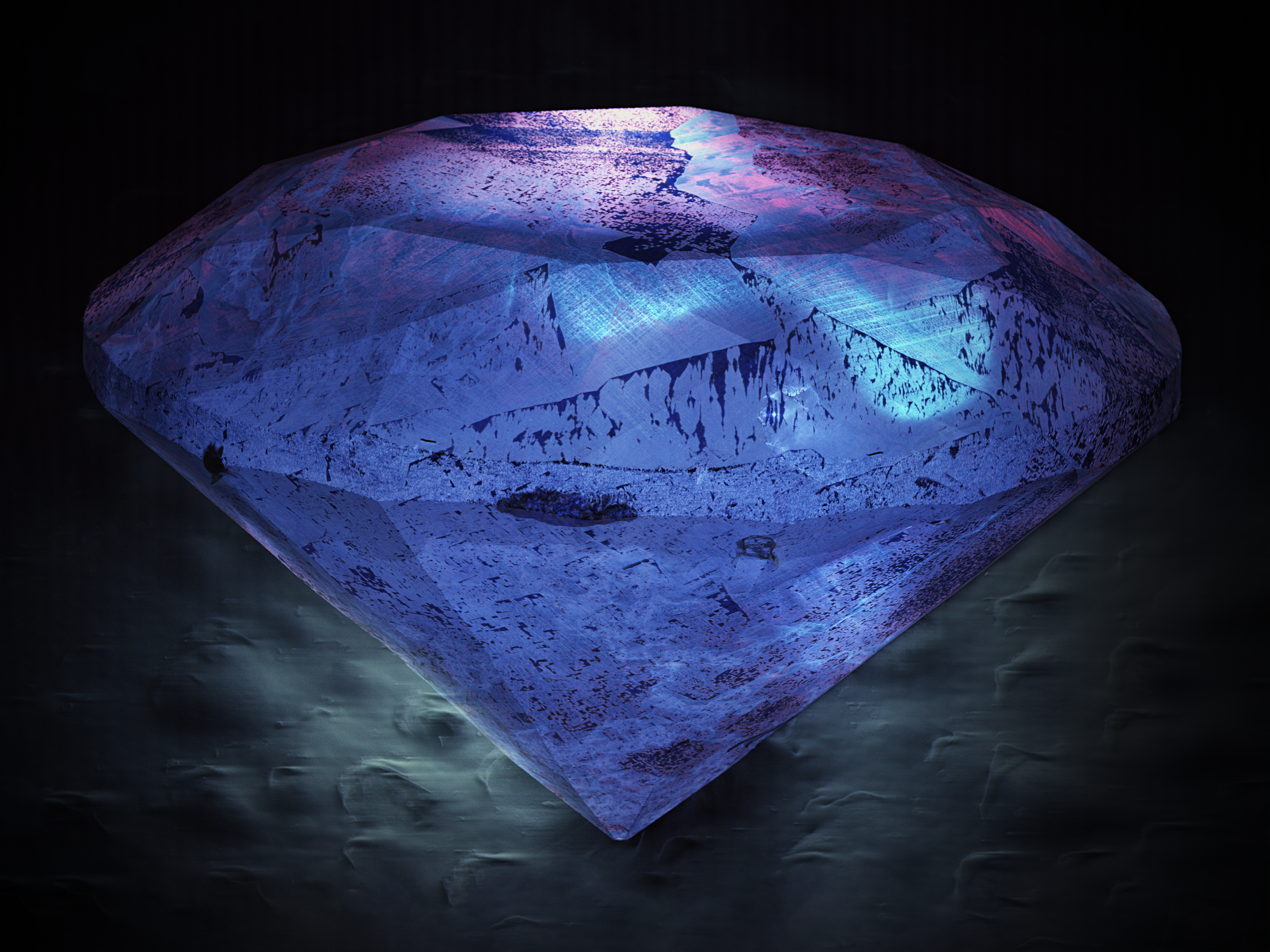
Color cathodoluminescence of a diamond in SEM, real colors

Cathodoluminescence is an optical and electromagnetic phenomenon in which electrons impacting on a luminescent material such as a phosphor, cause the emission of photons which may have wavelengths in the visible spectrum. A familiar example is the generation of light by an electron beam scanning the phosphor-coated inner surface of the screen of a television that uses a cathode-ray tube. Cathodoluminescence is the inverse of the photoelectric effect, in which electron emission is induced by irradiation with photons.

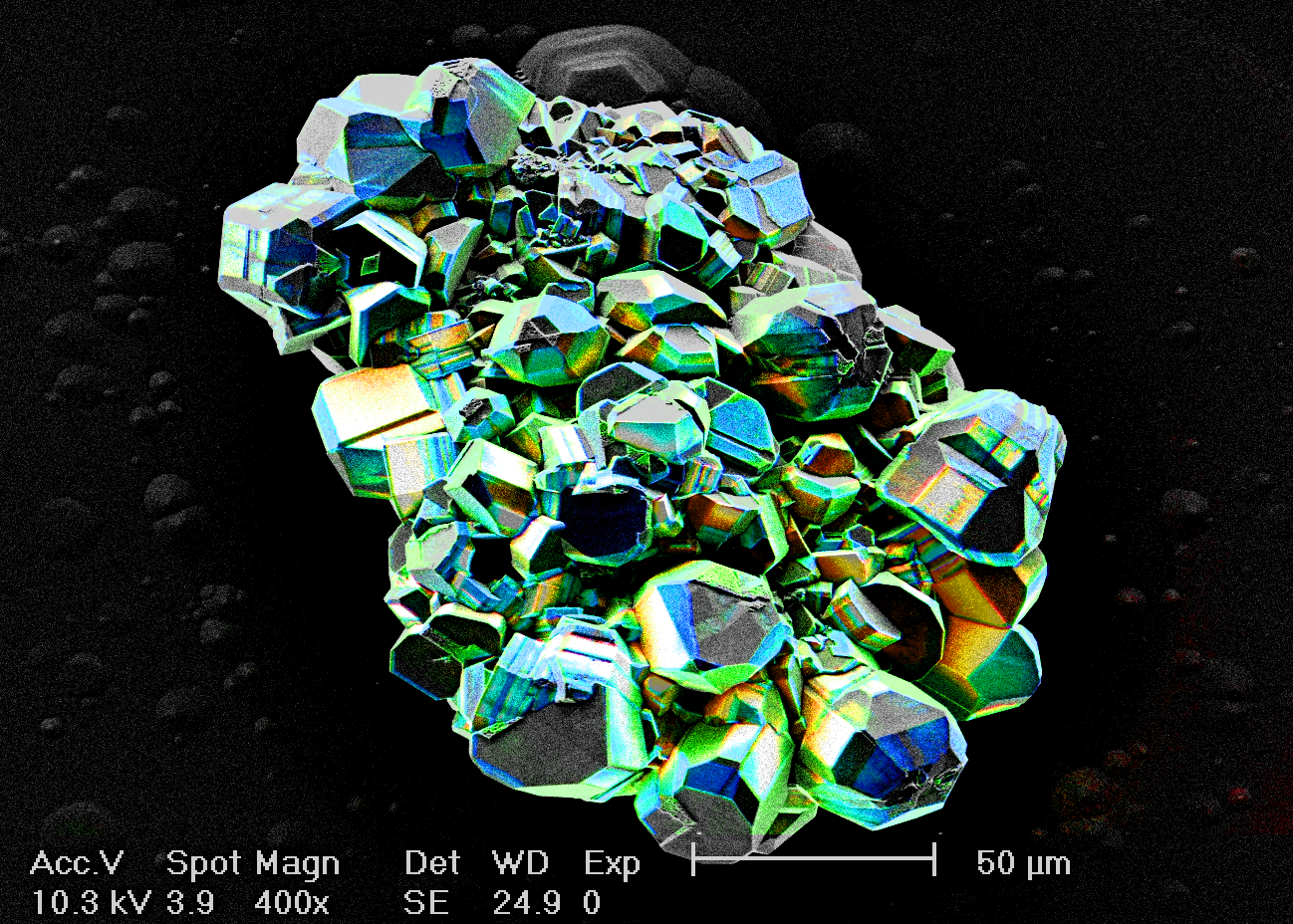
Color cathodoluminescence overlay on SEM image of an InGaN polycrystal. The blue and green channels represent real colors, the red channel corresponds to UV emission.

== Origin ==
Luminescence in a semiconductor results when an electron in the conduction band recombines with a hole in the valence band. The difference energy (band gap) of this transition can be emitted in form of a photon. The energy (color) of the photon, and the probability that a photon and not a phonon will be emitted, depends on the material, its purity, and the presence of defects. First, the electron has to be excited from the valence band into the conduction band. In cathodoluminescence, this occurs as the result of an impinging high energy electron beam onto a semiconductor. However, these primary electrons carry far too much energy to directly excite electrons. Instead, the inelastic scattering of the primary electrons in the crystal leads to the emission of secondary electrons, Auger electrons and X-rays, which in turn can scatter as well. Such a cascade of scattering events leads to up to 10^{3} secondary electrons per incident electron. These secondary electrons can excite valence electrons into the conduction band when they have a kinetic energy about three times the band gap energy of the material $(E_{kin}\approx 3 E_g)$. From there the electron recombines with a hole in the valence band and creates a photon. The excess energy is transferred to phonons and thus heats the lattice. One of the advantages of excitation with an electron beam is that the band gap energy of materials that are investigated is not limited by the energy of the incident light as in the case of photoluminescence. Therefore, in cathodoluminescence, the "semiconductor" examined can, in fact, be almost any non-metallic material. In terms of band structure, classical semiconductors, insulators, ceramics, gemstones, minerals, and glasses can be treated the same way.

== Microscopy ==
Thin section of quartz from a hydrothermal vein - left in CL and right in transmitted light

In geology, mineralogy, materials science and semiconductor engineering, a scanning electron microscope (SEM) fitted with a cathodoluminescence detector, or an optical cathodoluminescence microscope, may be used to examine internal structures of semiconductors, rocks, ceramics, glass, etc. in order to get information on the composition, growth and quality of the material.

=== Optical cathodoluminescence microscope ===
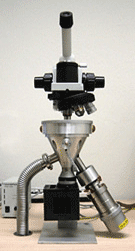
Hot cathode CL microscope

A cathodoluminescence (CL) microscope combines a regular (light optical) microscope with a cathode-ray tube. It is designed to image the luminescence characteristics of polished thin sections of solids irradiated by an electron beam.

Using a cathodoluminescence microscope, structures within crystals or fabrics can be made visible which cannot be seen in normal light conditions. Thus, for example, valuable information on the growth of minerals can be obtained. CL-microscopy is used in geology, mineralogy and materials science for the investigation of rocks, minerals, volcanic ash, glass, ceramic, concrete, fly ash, etc.

CL color and intensity are dependent on the characteristics of the sample and on the working conditions of the electron gun. Here, acceleration voltage and beam current of the electron beam are of major importance. Today, two types of CL microscopes are in use. One is working with a "cold cathode" generating an electron beam by a corona discharge tube, the other one produces a beam using a "hot cathode". Cold-cathode CL microscopes are the simplest and most economical type. Unlike other electron bombardment techniques like electron microscopy, cold cathodoluminescence microscopy provides positive ions along with the electrons which neutralize surface charge buildup and eliminate the need for conductive coatings to be applied to the specimens. The "hot cathode" type generates an electron beam by an electron gun with tungsten filament. The advantage of a hot cathode is the precisely controllable high beam intensity allowing to stimulate the emission of light even on weakly luminescing materials (e.g. quartz – see picture). To prevent charging of the sample, the surface must be coated with a conductive layer of gold or carbon. This is usually done by a sputter deposition device or a carbon coater.

=== Cathodoluminescence from a scanning electron microscope ===
Sketch of a cathodoluminescence system: The electron beam passes through a small aperture in the parabolic mirror which collects the light and reflects it into the spectrometer. A charge-coupled device (CCD) or photomultiplier (PMT) can be used for parallel or monochromatic detection, respectively. An electron beam-induced current (EBIC) signal may be recorded simultaneously.

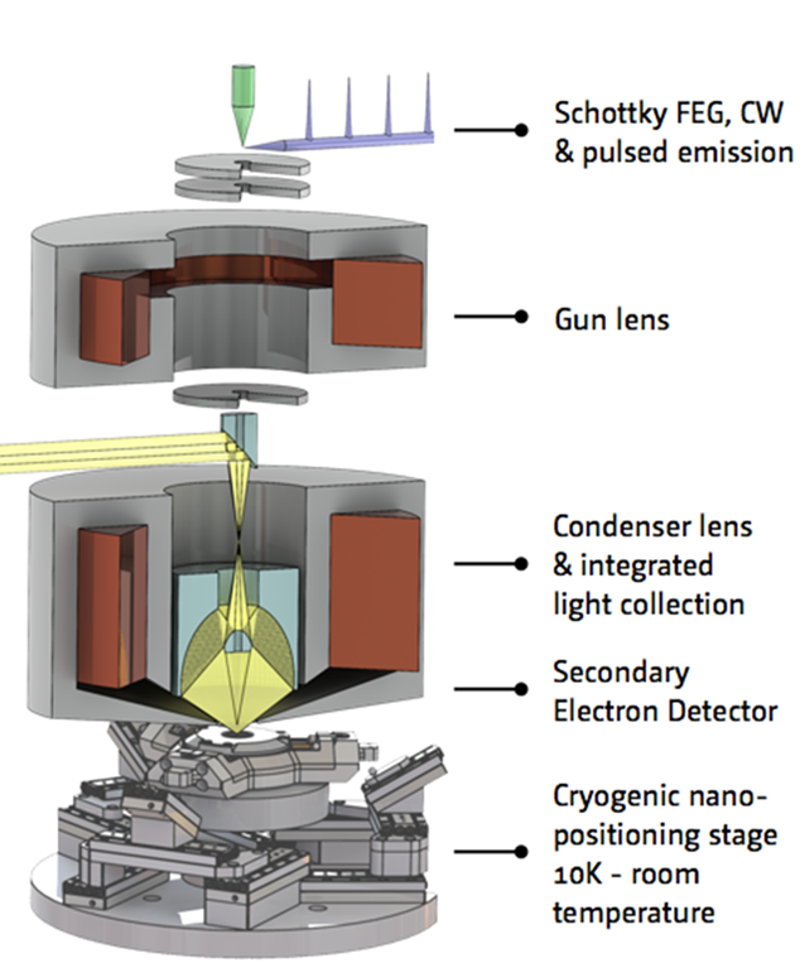
Sketch of a cathodoluminescence objective inserted in a SEM column

In scanning electron microscopes a focused beam of electrons impinges on a sample and induces it to emit light that is collected by an optical system, such as an elliptical mirror. From there, a fiber optic will transfer the light out of the microscope where it is separated into its component wavelengths by a monochromator and is then detected with a photomultiplier tube. By scanning the microscope's beam in an X-Y pattern and measuring the light emitted with the beam at each point, a map of the optical activity of the specimen can be obtained (cathodoluminescence imaging). Instead, by measuring the wavelength dependence for a fixed point or a certain area, the spectral characteristics can be recorded (cathodoluminescence spectroscopy). Furthermore, if the photomultiplier tube is replaced with a CCD camera, an entire spectrum can be measured at each point of a map (hyperspectral imaging). Moreover, the optical properties of an object can be correlated to structural properties observed with the electron microscope.

The primary advantages to the electron microscope based technique is its spatial resolution. In a scanning electron microscope, the attainable resolution is on the order of a few ten nanometers, while in a (scanning) transmission electron microscope (TEM), nanometer-sized features can be resolved. Additionally, it is possible to perform nanosecond- to picosecond-level time-resolved measurements if the electron beam can be "chopped" into nano- or pico-second pulses by a beam-blanker or with a pulsed electron source. These advanced techniques are useful for examining low-dimensional semiconductor structures, such a quantum wells or quantum dots.

While an electron microscope with a cathodoluminescence detector provides high magnification, an optical cathodoluminescence microscope benefits from its ability to show actual visible color features directly through the eyepiece. More recently developed systems try to combine both an optical and an electron microscope to take advantage of both these techniques.

== Extended applications ==
Although direct bandgap semiconductors such as GaAs or GaN are most easily examined by these techniques, indirect semiconductors such as silicon also emit weak cathodoluminescence, and can be examined as well. In particular, the luminescence of dislocated silicon is different from intrinsic silicon, and can be used to map defects in integrated circuits.

Recently, cathodoluminescence performed in electron microscopes is also being used to study surface plasmon resonances in metallic nanoparticles. Surface plasmons in metal nanoparticles can absorb and emit light, though the process is different from that in semiconductors. Similarly, cathodoluminescence has been exploited as a probe to map the local density of states of planar dielectric photonic crystals and nanostructured photonic materials.

== See also ==
- Electron-stimulated luminescence
- Luminescence
- Photoluminescence
- Scanning electron microscopy
