= Béhierite =

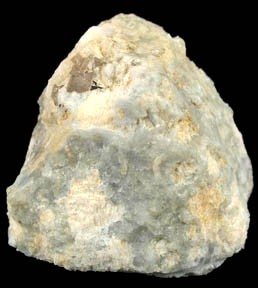

General
- Category: Borate
- Formula: TaBO_{4}
- IMA symbol: Béh
- Strunz classification: 6.AC.15
- Crystal system: Tetragonal
- Crystal class: Ditetragonal dipyramidal (4/mmm); H-M symbol: (4/m 2/m 2/m)
- Space group: I4_{1}/amd
- Unit cell: a = 6.21, c = 5.47 [Å] (approximated); Z = 4

Identification
- Crystal habit: pseudo-octahedral
- Cleavage: {110} and {010}, distinct
- Fracture: Subconchoidal
- Mohs scale hardness: 7-7.5
- Density: 7.91 (calc.), 7.86 (meas.)
- Optical properties: Uniaxial (+)
- Refractive index: nω & nε >2
- Birefringence: High

Béhierite is a very rare borate mineral, and the tantalum endmember of a (Nb,Ta)BO_{4} solid solution series formed with schiavinatoite, its niobium analogue.

Béhierite is also one of the most simple tantalum minerals. It contains simple tetrahedral borate anions, instead of more common among minerals, planar BO_{3} groups. Both have zircon-type structure (tetragonal, space group I4_{1}/amd) and are found in pegmatites. Béhierite and holtite are minerals with essential tantalum and boron.

Béhierite was named for Jean Béhier (1903–1965), who discovered the mineral in 1959, as a French mineralogist, active in the Service Géologique, on the island of Madagascar.

== Occurrence and association ==
Béhierite occurs in granitic pegmatites in Manjaka and Antsongombato, Madagascar. Associated minerals are albite, manganese-bearing apatite-group mineral, lepidolite, elbaite or elbaite–liddicoatite, feldspar, pollucite, quartz, rhodizite, and schiavinatoite.

== Crystal structure ==
Crystal structure of synthetic TaBO_{4} was refined by Range et al. (1996). As béhierite is analogous to schiavinatoite, their crystal structures are expected to be similar.
