= Christians in the Visual Arts =

American Christian visual arts organization

- Abbreviation: CIVA
- Formation: 1979
- Key people: Sandra Bowden
- Website: civa.org

Christians in the Visual Arts (CIVA) was an American visual arts organization working to enhance and explore the relationship between Christian faith and the visual arts. It was founded in 1979. After 45 years CIVA ceased its programming in June 2023.

Gallery instructor Jeremy Hamilton-Arnold describes CIVA's work as "Many of the artists involved [in CIVA] are making art worth showing, sharing, and talking about." It publishes the Seen magazine, and co-curates and co-sponsors traveling art exhibitions.

Contemporary Art and the Church: A Conversation Between Two Worlds, (2017) edited by W. David O. Taylor and Taylor Worley, is a collection of essays based on the 2015 CIVA conference.
