= Sample preparation equipment =

Sample preparation equipment refers to equipment used for the preparation of physical specimens for subsequent microscopy or related disciplines - including failure analysis and quality control. The equipment includes the following types of machinery:

- Precision cross-sectioning saws
- Precision lapping & polishing machines
- Selected Area Preparation Systems
- Decapsulation machinery (using mechanical, chemical/ 'jet etching' acid, laser and plasma methodologies)
- Focused ion beam (FIB) systems
- Anti-reflective coating systems
- Dimpling equipment
- Sputter coating equipment
- Carbon and metal evaporation systems

Each of these system types incorporates a wealth of accessories and consumable items which fit the particular system for a specific application.
