= Laser voltage prober =

The laser voltage probe (LVP) is a laser-based voltage and timing waveform acquisition system which is used to perform failure analysis on flip-chip integrated circuits. The device to be analyzed is de-encapsulated in order to expose the silicon surface. The silicon substrate is thinned mechanically using a back side mechanical thinning tool. The thinned device is then mounted on a movable stage and connected to an electrical stimulus source. Signal measurements are performed through the back side of the device after substrate thinning has been performed. The device being probed must be electrically stimulated using a repeating test pattern, with a trigger pulse provided to the LVP as reference. The operation of the LVP is similar to that of a sampling oscilloscope.

== Theory of operation ==
The LVP instrument measures voltage waveform signals in the device diffusion regions. Device imaging is accomplished through the use of a laser scanning microscope (LSM). The LVP uses dual infrared (IR) lasers to perform both device imaging and waveform acquisition. One laser is used to acquire images or waveforms from the device, while the second laser provides a reference which may be used to subtract unwanted noise from the signal data being acquired. On an electrically active device, the instrument monitors the changes in the phase of the electromagnetic field surrounding a signal being applied to a junction.

The instrument obtains voltage waveform and timing information by monitoring the interaction of laser light with the changes in the electric field across a p-n junction. As the laser reaches the silicon surface, a certain amount of that light is reflected back. The amount of reflected laser light from the junction is sampled at various points in time. The changing electromagnetic field at the junction affects the amount of laser light that is reflected back. By plotting the variations in reflected laser light versus time, it is possible to construct a timing waveform of the signal at the junction. As the test pattern continues to loop, additional measurements are acquired and averaged into the previous measurements. Over a period of time, this averaging of measurements produces a more refined waveform. The end result is a waveform that is representative of the electrical signal present at the junction.
