= Time-resolved photon emission =

Time-resolved photon emission (TRPE) is used to measure timing waveforms on semiconductor devices. TRPE measurements are performed on the back side of the semiconductor device. The substrate of the device-under-test (DUT) must first be thinned mechanically. The device is mounted on a movable X-Y stage in an enclosure which shields it from all sources of light. The DUT is connected to an active electrical stimulus. The stimulus pattern is continuously looped and a trigger signal is sent to the TRPE instrument in order to tell it when the pattern repeats. A TRPE prober operates in a manner similar to a sampling oscilloscope, and is used to perform semiconductor failure analysis.

== Theory of operation ==
As the electrical stimulus pattern is repetitively applied to the DUT, internal transistors switch on and off. As pMOS and nMOS transistors switch on or off, they emit photons. These photons emissions are recorded by a sensitive photon detector. By counting the number of photons emitted for a specific transistor across a period of time, a photon histogram may be constructed. The photon histogram records an increase in photon emissions during times that the transistor switches on or off. By detecting the combined photon emissions of pairs p- and n-channel transistors contained in logic gates, it is possible to use the resulting histogram to determine the locations in time of the rising and falling edges of the signal at that node. The waveform produced is not representative of a true voltage waveform, but more accurately represents the derivative of the waveform, with photon spikes being seen only at rising or falling edges.
