= Manganese(II) tungstate =

Names
- Other names Manganese tungstate

Identifiers
CAS Number	14177-46-9
3D model (JSmol)	Interactive image
ChemSpider	75996
EC Number	680-422-5
PubChem CID	84239
CompTox Dashboard (EPA)	DTXSID90931192
- InChI: InChI=1S/Mn.4O.W/q+2;;;2*-1; Key: CRLHSBRULQUYOK-UHFFFAOYSA-N
- SMILES: [O-][W](=O)(=O)[O-].[Mn+2]

Properties
Chemical formula	MnWO_{4}
Molar mass	302.79 g/mol
Appearance	Yellow to brown crystalline solid
Density	7.23 g/cm^{3}
Solubility in water	Practically insoluble in water

Structure
Crystal structure	monoclinic
Space group	P2/c (No. 13)
Lattice constant	a = 4.82 Å, b = 5.75 Å, c = 4.99 Å α = 90°, β = 91.1°, γ = 90°
Formula units (Z)	2 units per cell

Hazards
- GHS labelling
Pictograms	(GHS07: Exclamation mark)
Signal word	Warning
Hazard statements	H302, H319, H332, H335
Precautionary statements	P261, P264, P264+P265, P270, P271, P280, P301+P317, P304+P340, P305+P351+P338, P317, P319, P330, P337+P317, P403+P233, P405, P501
- Except where otherwise noted, data are given for materials in their standard state (at 25 °C [77 °F], 100 kPa). Infobox references

Manganese(II) tungstate is an inorganic compound with the chemical formula MnWO_{4}. It occurs naturally as the mineral hübnerite, the manganese-rich end member of the wolframite mineral series.

== Structure and properties ==
Manganese(II) tungstate crystallizes in the monoclinic wolframite structure, with space group P2/c (No. 13).

Its crystal structure consists of distorted MnO_{6} and WO_{6} octahedra. The octahedra share edges and form zigzag chains running approximately along the crystallographic c axis. Modern diffraction studies give closely similar cell dimensions and confirm the wolframite-type P2/c structure.

At room temperature MnWO_{4} is paramagnetic. On cooling it undergoes a series of magnetic phase transitions beginning at a Néel temperature of about 13.5 K. Three principal low-temperature antiferromagnetic phases, conventionally called AF1, AF2 and AF3, occur below approximately 13.5 K. The intermediate AF2 phase has an incommensurate spiral magnetic structure and is also ferroelectric, making MnWO_{4} a magnetically induced multiferroic material. The multiferroic phase occurs approximately between 7.8 and 12.5 K.

== Occurrence ==
Manganese(II) tungstate occurs naturally as hübnerite, MnWO_{4}. Hübnerite forms a solid-solution series with iron-rich ferberite, FeWO_{4}; compositions intermediate between the two are generally referred to as wolframite.

== Preparation ==
Manganese tungstate can be prepared by precipitation from aqueous solutions of a manganese(II) salt and a soluble tungstate such as sodium tungstate.

MnCl_{2} + Na_{2}WO_{4} → MnWO_{4}↓ + 2 NaCl

Nanocrystalline MnWO_{4} has also been prepared by solvothermal, hydrothermal and microwave-assisted methods. Coprecipitation from manganese(II) chloride and sodium tungstate gives the monoclinic wolframite phase after suitable treatment.

It can also be prepared by a high-temperature solid-state reaction between manganese and tungsten oxides. One reported reaction uses manganese(III) oxide and tungsten trioxide:

Mn_{2}O_{3} + 2 WO_{3} → 2 MnWO_{4} + 1/2 O_{2}

== Reactions ==
Ammonolysis of amorphous MnWO_{4} at around 800 °C produces the ternary nitride MnWN_{2}.

Reaction with Pr_{2}WO_{6} at elevated temperature has been used to prepare the mixed-metal tungstate MnPr_{2}W_{2}O_{10}.

== Applications ==
MnWO_{4} has been investigated as a photocatalyst. Nanostructured MnWO_{4} can promote the photodegradation of organic pollutants, and manganese tungstate-based materials have also been studied for photocatalytic reduction reactions.

It has also been investigated as the active material in thick-film humidity sensors, in which the electrical impedance of MnWO_{4}-containing films changes with relative humidity.
