= Mineral =

Crystalline chemical element or compound formed by geologic processes

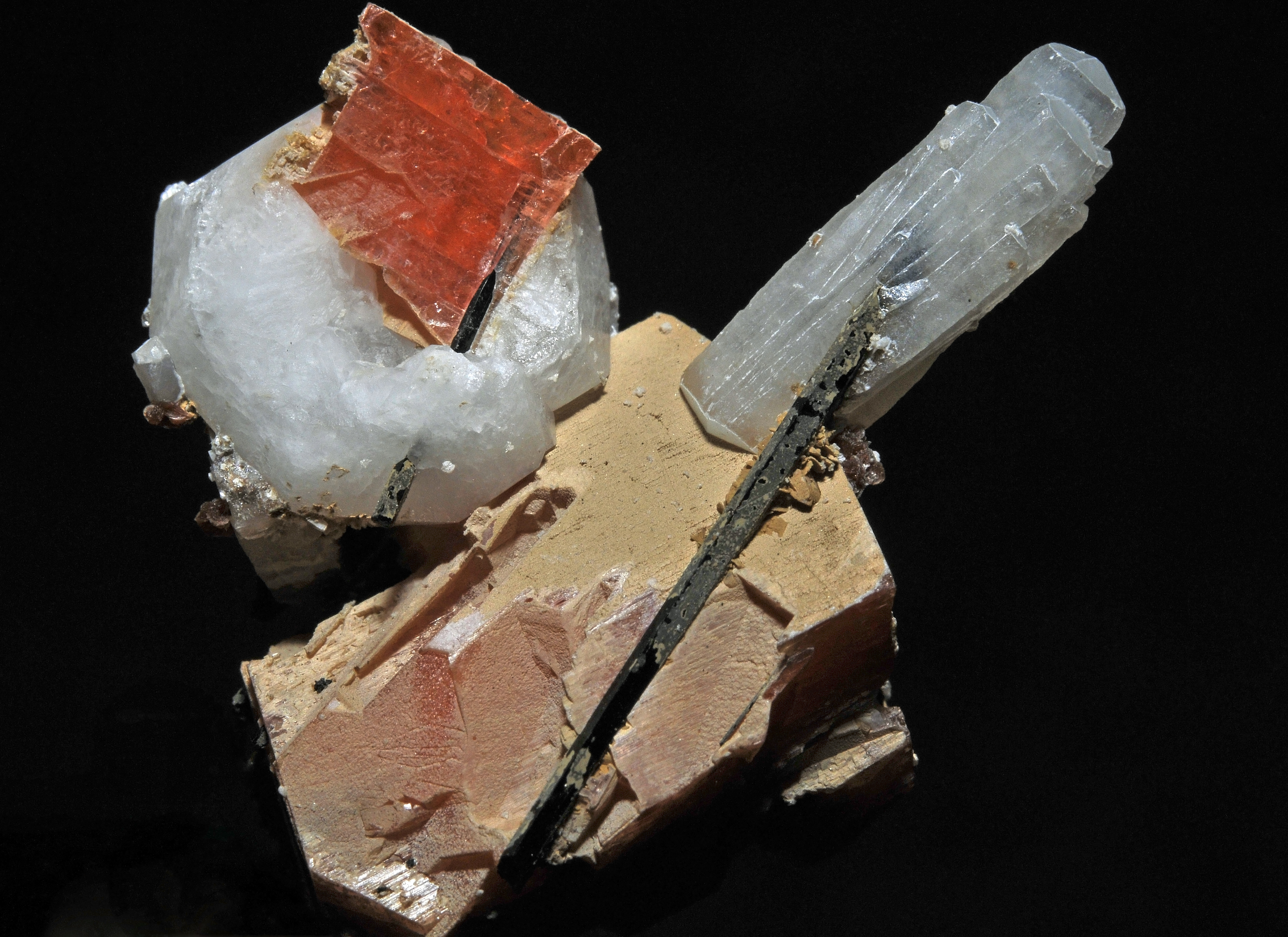
Crystals of serandite, natrolite, analcime, and aegirine from Mont Saint-Hilaire, Quebec, Canada

In geology and mineralogy, a mineral or mineral species is, broadly speaking, a solid substance with a fairly well-defined chemical composition and a specific crystal structure that occurs naturally in pure form.

The geological definition of mineral normally excludes compounds that occur only in living organisms. However, some minerals are often biogenic (such as calcite) or chemically organic compounds (such as mellite). Moreover, living organisms often synthesize inorganic minerals (such as hydroxylapatite) that also occur in rocks.

The concept of mineral is distinct from rock, which is any bulk solid geologic material that is relatively homogeneous at a large enough scale. A rock may consist of one type of mineral or may be an aggregate of two or more different types of minerals, spacially segregated into distinct phases.

Some natural solid substances without a definite crystalline structure, such as opal or obsidian, are more properly called mineraloids. If a chemical compound occurs naturally with different crystal structures, each structure is considered a different mineral species. Thus, for example, quartz and stishovite are two different minerals consisting of the same compound, silicon dioxide.

The International Mineralogical Association (IMA) is the generally recognized standard body for the definition and nomenclature of mineral species. As of August 2026, the IMA recognizes 6,228 official mineral species.

The chemical composition of a named mineral species may vary somewhat because the inclusion of small amounts of impurities. Specific varieties of a species sometimes have conventional or official names of their own. For example, amethyst is a purple variety of the mineral species quartz. Some mineral species can have variable proportions of two or more chemical elements that occupy equivalent positions in the mineral's structure; for example, the formula of mackinawite is given as (Fe,Ni)_{9}S_{8}, meaning Fe_{x}Ni_{9-x}S_{8}, where x is a variable number between 0 and 9. Sometimes a mineral with variable composition is split into separate species, more or less arbitrarily, forming a mineral group; that is the case of the silicates Ca_{x}Mg_{y}Fe_{2-x-y}SiO_{4}, the olivine group.

Besides the essential chemical composition and crystal structure, the description of a mineral species usually includes its common physical properties such as habit, hardness, lustre, diaphaneity, colour, streak, tenacity, cleavage, fracture, system, zoning, parting, specific gravity, magnetism, fluorescence, radioactivity, as well as its taste or smell and its reaction to acid.

Minerals are classified by key chemical constituents; the two dominant systems are the Dana classification and the Strunz classification. Silicate minerals comprise approximately 90% of the Earth's crust. Other important mineral groups include the native elements (made up of a single pure element) and compounds (combinations of multiple elements) namely sulfides (e.g. Galena PbS), oxides (e.g. quartz SiO_{2}), halides (e.g. rock salt NaCl), carbonates (e.g. calcite CaCO_{3}), sulfates (e.g. gypsum CaSO_{4}·2H_{2}O), silicates (e.g. orthoclase KAlSi_{3}O_{8}), molybdates (e.g. wulfenite PbMoO_{4}) and phosphates (e.g. pyromorphite Pb_{5}(PO_{4})_{3}Cl).

== Definitions ==
=== International Mineralogical Association ===
The International Mineralogical Association has established the following requirements for a substance to be considered a distinct mineral:

1. It must be a naturally occurring substance formed by natural geological processes, on Earth or other extraterrestrial bodies. This excludes compounds directly and exclusively generated by human activities (anthropogenic) or in living beings (biogenic), such as tungsten carbide, urinary calculi, calcium oxalate crystals in plant tissues, and seashells. However, substances with such origins may qualify if geological processes were involved in their genesis (as is the case of evenkite, derived from plant material; or taranakite, from bat guano; or alpersite, from mine tailings). Hypothetical substances are also excluded, even if they are predicted to occur in inaccessible natural environments like the Earth's core or other planets.
2. It must be a solid substance in its natural occurrence. A major exception to this rule is native mercury: it is still classified as a mineral by the IMA, even though crystallizes only below −39 °C, because it was included before the current rules were established. Water and carbon dioxide are not considered minerals, even though they are often found as inclusions in other minerals; but water ice is considered a mineral.
3. It must have a well-defined crystallographic structure; or, more generally, an ordered atomic arrangement. This property implies several macroscopic physical properties, such as crystal form, hardness, and cleavage. It excludes ozokerite, limonite, obsidian and many other amorphous (non-crystalline) materials that occur in geologic contexts.
4. It must have a fairly well defined chemical composition. However, certain crystalline substances with a fixed structure but variable composition may be considered single mineral species. A common class of examples are solid solutions such as mackinawite, (Fe, Ni)_{9}S_{8}, which is mostly a ferrous sulfide with a significant fraction of iron atoms replaced by nickel atoms. Other examples include layered crystals with variable layer stacking, or crystals that differ only in the regular arrangement of vacancies and substitutions. On the other hand, some substances that have a continuous series of compositions, may be arbitrarily split into several minerals. The typical example is the olivine group (Mg, Fe)_{2}SiO_{4}, whose magnesium-rich and iron-rich end-members are considered separate minerals (forsterite and fayalite).

The details of these rules are somewhat controversial. For instance, there have been several recent proposals to classify amorphous substances as minerals, but they have not been accepted by the IMA.

The IMA is also reluctant to accept minerals that occur naturally only in the form of nanoparticles a few hundred atoms across, but has not defined a minimum crystal size.

Some authors require the material to be a stable or metastable solid at room temperature (25 °C). However, the IMA only requires that the substance be stable enough for its structure and composition to be well-determined. For example, it recognizes meridianiite (a naturally occurring hydrate of magnesium sulfate) as a mineral, even though it is formed and stable only below 2 °C.

As of August 2026, 6,226 mineral species are approved by the IMA. They are most commonly named after a person, followed by discovery location; names based on chemical composition or physical properties are the two other major groups of mineral name etymologies. Most names end in "-ite"; the exceptions are usually names that were well-established before the organization of mineralogy as a discipline, for example galena and diamond.

=== Biogenic minerals ===
A topic of contention among geologists and mineralogists has been the IMA's decision to exclude biogenic crystalline substances. For example, Lowenstam (1981) stated that "organisms are capable of forming a diverse array of minerals, some of which cannot be formed inorganically in the biosphere."

Skinner (2005) views all solids as potential minerals and includes biominerals in the mineral kingdom, which are those that are created by the metabolic activities of organisms. Skinner expanded the previous definition of a mineral to classify "element or compound, amorphous or crystalline, formed through biogeochemical processes," as a mineral.

Recent advances in high-resolution genetics and X-ray absorption spectroscopy are providing revelations on the biogeochemical relations between microorganisms and minerals that may shed new light on this question. For example, the IMA-commissioned "Working Group on Environmental Mineralogy and Geochemistry " deals with minerals in the hydrosphere, atmosphere, and biosphere. The group's scope includes mineral-forming microorganisms, which exist on nearly every rock, soil, and particle surface spanning the globe to depths of at least 1600 metres below the sea floor and 70 kilometres into the stratosphere (possibly entering the mesosphere).

Biogeochemical cycles have contributed to the formation of minerals for billions of years. Microorganisms can precipitate metals from solution, contributing to the formation of ore deposits. They can also catalyze the dissolution of minerals.

Prior to the International Mineralogical Association's listing, over 60 biominerals had been discovered, named, and published. These minerals (a sub-set tabulated in Lowenstam (1981)) are considered minerals proper according to Skinner's (2005) definition. These biominerals are not listed in the International Mineral Association official list of mineral names; however, many of these biomineral representatives are distributed amongst the 78 mineral classes listed in the Dana classification scheme.

Skinner's (2005) definition of a mineral takes this matter into account by stating that a mineral can be crystalline or amorphous. Although biominerals are not the most common form of minerals, they help to define the limits of what constitutes a mineral proper. Nickel's (1995) formal definition explicitly mentioned crystallinity as a key to defining a substance as a mineral. A 2011 article defined icosahedrite, an aluminium-iron-copper alloy, as a mineral; named for its unique natural icosahedral symmetry, it is a quasicrystal. Unlike a true crystal, quasicrystals are ordered but not periodic.

=== Mineral assemblage ===
A mineral assemblage is defined by Mindat.org as "Any set of minerals in a rock, whether in [chemical] equilibrium or not", while Encyclopaedia Britannica says "The term assemblage is frequently applied to all minerals included in a rock but more appropriately should be used for those minerals that are in equilibrium (and are known more specifically as the equilibrium assemblage)".

The term is often prefixed by other terms that describe its formation.

== Rocks, ores, and gems ==
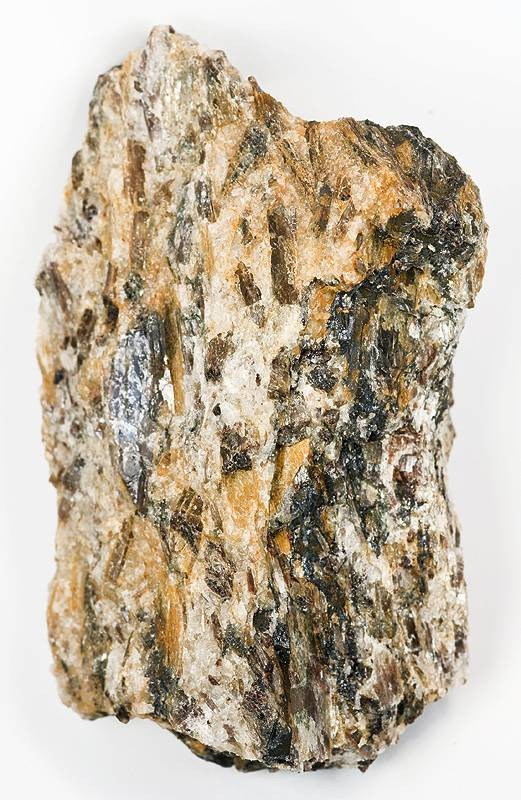
Schist is a metamorphic rock characterized by an abundance of platy minerals. In this example, the rock has prominent sillimanite porphyroblasts as large as 3 cm (1.2 in).

A rock is an aggregate of one or more minerals or mineraloids. Some rocks, such as limestone or quartzite, are composed primarily of one mineral – calcite or aragonite in the case of limestone, and quartz in the latter case. Other rocks can be defined by relative abundances of key (essential) minerals; a granite is defined by proportions of quartz, alkali feldspar, and plagioclase feldspar. The other minerals in the rock are termed accessory minerals, and do not greatly affect the bulk composition of the rock. Rocks can also be composed entirely of non-mineral material; coal is a sedimentary rock composed primarily of organically derived carbon.

In rocks, some mineral species and groups are much more abundant than others; these are termed the rock-forming minerals. The major examples of these are quartz, the feldspars, the micas, the amphiboles, the pyroxenes, the olivines, and calcite; except for the last one, all of these minerals are silicates. Overall, around 150 minerals are considered particularly important, whether in terms of their abundance or aesthetic value in terms of collecting.

Commercially valuable minerals and rocks, other than gemstones, metal ores, or mineral fuels, are referred to as industrial minerals. For example, muscovite, a white mica, can be used for windows (sometimes referred to as isinglass), as a filler, or as an insulator.

Ores are minerals that have a high concentration of a certain element, typically a metal. Examples are cinnabar (HgS), an ore of mercury; sphalerite (ZnS), an ore of zinc; cassiterite (SnO_{2}), an ore of tin; and colemanite, an ore of boron.

Gems are minerals with an ornamental value, and are distinguished from non-gems by their beauty, durability, and usually, rarity. There are about 20 mineral species that qualify as gem minerals, which constitute about 35 of the most common gemstones. Gem minerals are often present in several varieties, and so one mineral can account for several different gemstones; for example, ruby and sapphire are both corundum, Al_{2}O_{3}.

== Etymology ==
The first known use of the word "mineral" in the English language (Middle English) was the 15th century. The word came from Medieval Latin: minerale, from minera, mine, ore.

The word "species" comes from the Latin species, "a particular sort, kind, or type with distinct look, or appearance".

== Chemistry ==
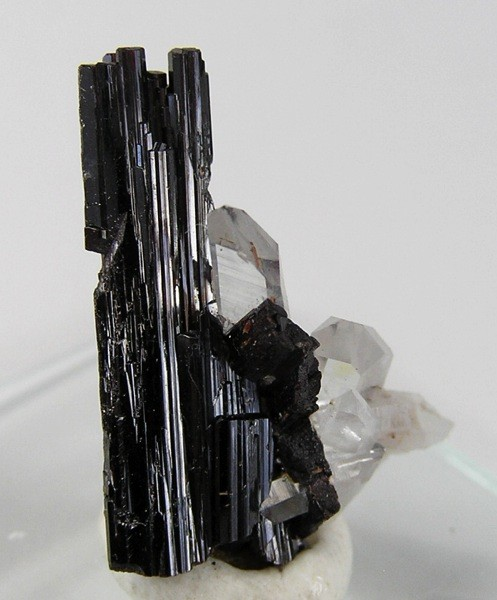
Hübnerite, the manganese-rich end-member of the wolframite series, with minor quartz in the background

The abundance and diversity of minerals is controlled directly by their chemistry, in turn dependent on elemental abundances in the Earth. The majority of minerals observed are derived from the Earth's crust. Eight elements account for most of the key components of minerals, due to their abundance in the crust. These eight elements, summing to over 98% of the crust by weight, are, in order of decreasing abundance: oxygen, silicon, aluminium, iron, magnesium, calcium, sodium and potassium. Oxygen and silicon are by far the two most important – oxygen composes 47% of the crust by weight, and silicon accounts for 28%.

The minerals that form are those that are most stable at the temperature and pressure of formation, within the limits imposed by the bulk chemistry of the parent body. For example, in most igneous rocks, the aluminium and alkali metals (sodium and potassium) that are present are primarily found in combination with oxygen, silicon, and calcium as feldspar minerals. However, if the rock is unusually rich in alkali metals, there will not be enough aluminium to combine with all the sodium as feldspar, and the excess sodium will form sodic amphiboles such as riebeckite. If the aluminium abundance is unusually high, the excess aluminium will form muscovite or other aluminium-rich minerals. If silicon is deficient, part of the feldspar will be replaced by feldspathoid minerals. Precise predictions of which minerals will be present in a rock of a particular composition formed at a particular temperature and pressure requires complex thermodynamic calculations. However, approximate estimates may be made using relatively simple rules of thumb, such as the CIPW norm, which gives reasonable estimates for volcanic rock formed from dry magma.

The chemical composition may vary between end member species of a solid solution series. For example, the plagioclase feldspars comprise a continuous series from sodium-rich end member albite (NaAlSi_{3}O_{8}) to calcium-rich anorthite (CaAl_{2}Si_{2}O_{8}) with four recognized intermediate varieties between them (given in order from sodium- to calcium-rich): oligoclase, andesine, labradorite, and bytownite. Other examples of series include the olivine series of magnesium-rich forsterite and iron-rich fayalite, and the wolframite series of manganese-rich hübnerite and iron-rich ferberite.

Chemical substitution and coordination polyhedra explain this common feature of minerals. In nature, minerals are not pure substances, and are contaminated by whatever other elements are present in the given chemical system. As a result, it is possible for one element to be substituted for another. Chemical substitution will occur between ions of a similar size and charge; for example, K^{+} will not substitute for Si^{4+} because of chemical and structural incompatibilities caused by a big difference in size and charge. A common example of chemical substitution is that of Si^{4+} by Al^{3+}, which are close in charge, size, and abundance in the crust. In the example of plagioclase, there are three cases of substitution. Feldspars are all framework silicates, which have a silicon-oxygen ratio of 2:1, and the space for other elements is given by the substitution of Si^{4+} by Al^{3+} to give a base unit of [AlSi_{3}O_{8}]^{−}; without the substitution, the formula would be charge-balanced as SiO_{2}, giving quartz. The significance of this structural property will be explained further by coordination polyhedra. The second substitution occurs between Na^{+} and Ca^{2+}; however, the difference in charge has to accounted for by making a second substitution of Si^{4+} by Al^{3+}.

Coordination polyhedra are geometric representations of how a cation is surrounded by an anion. In mineralogy, coordination polyhedra are usually considered in terms of oxygen, due its abundance in the crust. The base unit of silicate minerals is the silica tetrahedron – one Si^{4+} surrounded by four O^{2−}. An alternate way of describing the coordination of the silicate is by a number: in the case of the silica tetrahedron, the silicon is said to have a coordination number of 4. Various cations have a specific range of possible coordination numbers; for silicon, it is almost always 4, except for very high-pressure minerals where the compound is compressed such that silicon is in six-fold (octahedral) coordination with oxygen. Bigger cations have a bigger coordination numbers because of the increase in relative size as compared to oxygen (the last orbital subshell of heavier atoms is different too). Changes in coordination numbers leads to physical and mineralogical differences; for example, at high pressure, such as in the mantle, many minerals, especially silicates such as olivine and garnet, will change to a perovskite structure, where silicon is in octahedral coordination. Other examples are the aluminosilicates kyanite, andalusite, and sillimanite (polymorphs, since they share the formula Al_{2}SiO_{5}), which differ by the coordination number of the Al^{3+}; these minerals transition from one another as a response to changes in pressure and temperature. In the case of silicate materials, the substitution of Si^{4+} by Al^{3+} allows for a variety of minerals because of the need to balance charges.

Because the eight most common elements make up over 98% of the Earth's crust, the small quantities of the other elements that are typically present are substituted into the common rock-forming minerals. The distinctive minerals of most elements are quite rare, being found only where these elements have been concentrated by geological processes, such as hydrothermal circulation, to the point where they can no longer be accommodated in common minerals.

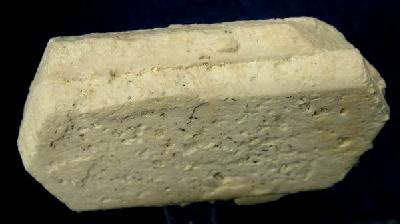
When minerals react, the products will sometimes assume the shape of the reagent; the product mineral is termed a pseudomorph of (or after) the reagent. Illustrated here is a pseudomorph of kaolinite after orthoclase. Here, the pseudomorph preserved the Carlsbad twinning common in orthoclase.

Changes in temperature and pressure and composition alter the mineralogy of a rock sample. Changes in composition can be caused by processes such as weathering or metasomatism (hydrothermal alteration). Changes in temperature and pressure occur when the host rock undergoes tectonic or magmatic movement into differing physical regimes. Changes in thermodynamic conditions make it favourable for mineral assemblages to react with each other to produce new minerals; as such, it is possible for two rocks to have an identical or a very similar bulk rock chemistry without having a similar mineralogy. This process of mineralogical alteration is related to the rock cycle. An example of a series of mineral reactions is illustrated as follows.

Orthoclase feldspar (KAlSi_{3}O_{8}) is a mineral commonly found in granite, a plutonic igneous rock. When exposed to weathering, it reacts to form kaolinite (Al_{2}Si_{2}O_{5}(OH)_{4}, a sedimentary mineral, and silicic acid):

2 KAlSi_{3}O_{8} + 5 H_{2}O + 2 H^{+} → Al_{2}Si_{2}O_{5}(OH)_{4} + 4 H_{2}SiO_{3} + 2 K^{+}

Under low-grade metamorphic conditions, kaolinite reacts with quartz to form pyrophyllite (Al_{2}Si_{4}O_{10}(OH)_{2}):

Al_{2}Si_{2}O_{5}(OH)_{4} + SiO_{2} → Al_{2}Si_{4}O_{10}(OH)_{2} + H_{2}O

As metamorphic grade increases, the pyrophyllite reacts to form kyanite and quartz:

Al_{2}Si_{4}O_{10}(OH)_{2} → Al_{2}SiO_{5} + 3 SiO_{2} + H_{2}O

Alternatively, a mineral may change its crystal structure as a consequence of changes in temperature and pressure without reacting. For example, quartz will change into a variety of its SiO_{2} polymorphs, such as tridymite and cristobalite at high temperatures, and coesite at high pressures.

== Physical properties ==
Classifying minerals ranges from simple to difficult. A mineral can be identified by several physical properties, some of them being sufficient for full identification without equivocation. In other cases, minerals can only be classified by more complex optical, chemical or X-ray diffraction analysis; these methods, however, can be costly and time-consuming. Physical properties applied for classification include crystal structure and habit, hardness, lustre, diaphaneity, colour, streak, cleavage and fracture, and specific gravity. Other less general tests include fluorescence, phosphorescence, magnetism, radioactivity, tenacity (response to mechanical induced changes of shape or form), piezoelectricity and reactivity to dilute acids.

=== Crystal structure and habit ===
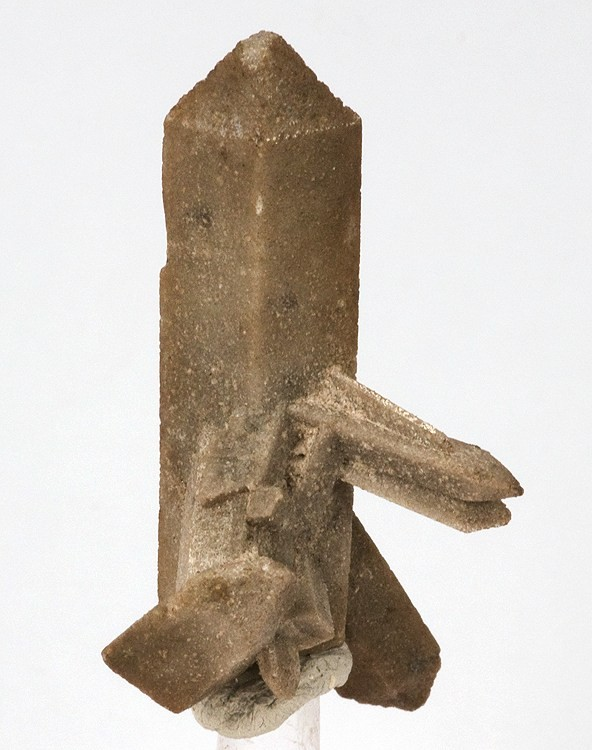
Topaz has a characteristic orthorhombic elongated crystal shape.

Crystal structure results from the orderly geometric spatial arrangement of atoms in the internal structure of a mineral. This crystal structure is based on regular internal atomic or ionic arrangement that is often expressed in the geometric form that the crystal takes. Even when the mineral grains are too small to see or are irregularly shaped, the underlying crystal structure is always periodic and can be determined by X-ray diffraction. Minerals are typically described by their symmetry content. Crystals are restricted to 32 point groups, which differ by their symmetry. These groups are classified in turn into more broad categories, the most encompassing of these being the six crystal families.

These families can be described by the relative lengths of the three crystallographic axes, and the angles between them; these relationships correspond to the symmetry operations that define the narrower point groups. They are summarized below; a, b, and c represent the axes, and α, β, γ represent the angle opposite the respective crystallographic axis (e.g. α is the angle opposite the a-axis, viz. the angle between the b and c axes):

| Crystal family | Lengths | Angles | Common examples |
|---|---|---|---|
| Isometric | a = b = c | α = β = γ = 90° | Garnet, halite, pyrite |
| Tetragonal | a = b ≠ c | α = β = γ = 90° | Rutile, zircon, andalusite |
| Orthorhombic | a ≠ b ≠ c | α = β = γ = 90° | Olivine, aragonite, orthopyroxenes |
| Hexagonal | a = b ≠ c | α = β = 90°, γ = 120° | Quartz, calcite, tourmaline |
| Monoclinic | a ≠ b ≠ c | α = γ = 90°, β ≠ 90° | Clinopyroxenes, orthoclase, gypsum |
| Triclinic | a ≠ b ≠ c | α ≠ β ≠ γ ≠ 90° | Anorthite, albite, kyanite |

The hexagonal crystal family is also split into two crystal systems – the trigonal, which has a three-fold axis of symmetry, and the hexagonal, which has a six-fold axis of symmetry.

Chemistry and crystal structure together define a mineral. With a restriction to 32 point groups, minerals of different chemistry may have identical crystal structure. For example, halite (NaCl), galena (PbS), and periclase (MgO) all belong to the hexaoctahedral point group (isometric family), as they have a similar stoichiometry between their different constituent elements. In contrast, polymorphs are groupings of minerals that share a chemical formula but have a different structure. For example, pyrite and marcasite, both iron sulfides, have the formula FeS_{2}; however, the former is isometric while the latter is orthorhombic. This polymorphism extends to other sulfides with the generic AX_{2} formula; these two groups are collectively known as the pyrite and marcasite groups.

Polymorphism can extend beyond pure symmetry content. The aluminosilicates are a group of three minerals – kyanite, andalusite, and sillimanite – which share the chemical formula Al_{2}SiO_{5}. Kyanite is triclinic, while andalusite and sillimanite are both orthorhombic and belong to the dipyramidal point group. These differences arise corresponding to how aluminium is coordinated within the crystal structure. In all minerals, one aluminium ion is always in six-fold coordination with oxygen. Silicon, as a general rule, is in four-fold coordination in all minerals; an exception is a case like stishovite (SiO_{2}, an ultra-high pressure quartz polymorph with rutile structure). In kyanite, the second aluminium is in six-fold coordination; its chemical formula can be expressed as Al^{[6]}Al^{[6]}SiO_{5}, to reflect its crystal structure. Andalusite has the second aluminium in five-fold coordination (Al^{[6]}Al^{[5]}SiO_{5}) and sillimanite has it in four-fold coordination (Al^{[6]}Al^{[4]}SiO_{5}).

Differences in crystal structure and chemistry greatly influence other physical properties of the mineral. The carbon allotropes diamond and graphite have vastly different properties; diamond is the hardest natural substance, has an adamantine lustre, and belongs to the isometric crystal family, whereas graphite is very soft, has a greasy lustre, and crystallises in the hexagonal family. This difference is accounted for by differences in bonding. In diamond, the carbons are in sp^{3} hybrid orbitals, which means they form a framework where each carbon is covalently bonded to four neighbours in a tetrahedral fashion; on the other hand, graphite is composed of sheets of carbons in sp^{2} hybrid orbitals, where each carbon is bonded covalently to only three others. These sheets are held together by much weaker van der Waals forces, and this discrepancy translates to large macroscopic differences.

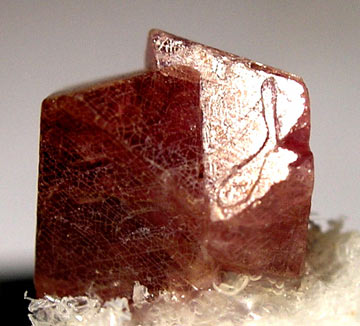
Contact twins, as seen in spinel

Twinning is the intergrowth of two or more crystals of a single mineral species. The geometry of the twinning is controlled by the mineral's symmetry. As a result, there are several types of twins, including contact twins, reticulated twins, geniculated twins, penetration twins, cyclic twins, and polysynthetic twins. Contact, or simple twins, consist of two crystals joined at a plane; this type of twinning is common in spinel. Reticulated twins, common in rutile, are interlocking crystals resembling netting. Geniculated twins have a bend in the middle that is caused by start of the twin. Penetration twins consist of two single crystals that have grown into each other; examples of this twinning include cross-shaped staurolite twins and Carlsbad twinning in orthoclase. Cyclic twins are caused by repeated twinning around a rotation axis. This type of twinning occurs around three, four, five, six, or eight-fold axes, and the corresponding patterns are called threelings, fourlings, fivelings, sixlings, and eightlings. Sixlings are common in aragonite. Polysynthetic twins are similar to cyclic twins through the presence of repetitive twinning; however, instead of occurring around a rotational axis, polysynthetic twinning occurs along parallel planes, usually on a microscopic scale.

Crystal habit refers to the overall shape of the aggregate crystal of any mineral. Several terms are used to describe this property. Common habits include acicular, which describes needle-like crystals as in natrolite; dendritic (tree-pattern) is common in native copper or native gold with a groundmass (matrix); equant, which is typical of garnet; prismatic (elongated in one direction) as seen in kunzite or stibnite; botryoidal (like a bunch of grapes) seen in chalcedony; fibrous, which has fibre-like crystals as seen in wollastonite; tabular, which differs from bladed habit in that the former is platy whereas the latter has a defined elongation as seen in muscovite; and massive, which has no definite shape as seen in carnallite. Related to crystal form, the quality of crystal faces is diagnostic of some minerals, especially with a petrographic microscope. Euhedral crystals have a defined external shape, while anhedral crystals do not; those intermediate forms are termed subhedral.

=== Hardness ===
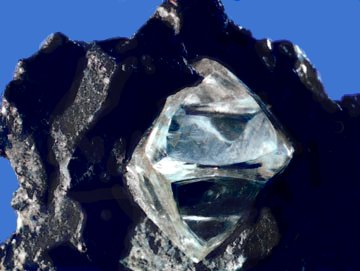
Diamond is the hardest natural material, and has a Mohs hardness of 10.

The hardness of a mineral defines how much it can resist scratching or indentation. This physical property is controlled by the chemical composition and crystalline structure of a mineral.

The most commonly used scale of measurement is the ordinal Mohs hardness scale, which measures resistance to scratching. Defined by ten indicators, a mineral with a higher index scratches those below it. The scale ranges from talc, a phyllosilicate, to diamond, a carbon polymorph that is the hardest natural material. The scale is provided below:

| Mohs hardness | Mineral | Chemical formulae |
|---|---|---|
| 1 | Talc | Mg_{3}Si_{4}O_{10}(OH)_{2} |
| 2 | Gypsum | CaSO_{4}·2H_{2}O |
| 3 | Calcite | CaCO_{3} |
| 4 | Fluorite | CaF_{2} |
| 5 | Apatite | Ca_{5}(PO_{4})_{3}(OH,Cl,F) |
| 6 | Orthoclase | KAlSi_{3}O_{8} |
| 7 | Quartz | SiO_{2} |
| 8 | Topaz | Al_{2}SiO_{4}(OH,F)_{2} |
| 9 | Corundum | Al_{2}O_{3} |
| 10 | Diamond | C |

Mohs Scale versus Absolute Hardness

A mineral's hardness is a function of its structure. Hardness is not necessarily constant for all crystallographic directions; crystallographic weakness renders some directions softer than others. An example of this hardness variability exists in kyanite, which has a Mohs hardness of 5 1/2 parallel to [001] but 7 parallel to [100].

Other scales include these;

- Shore's hardness test, which measures the endurance of a mineral based on the indentation of a spring-loaded contraption.
- The Rockwell scale
- The Vickers hardness test
- The Brinell scale

=== Lustre and diaphaneity ===
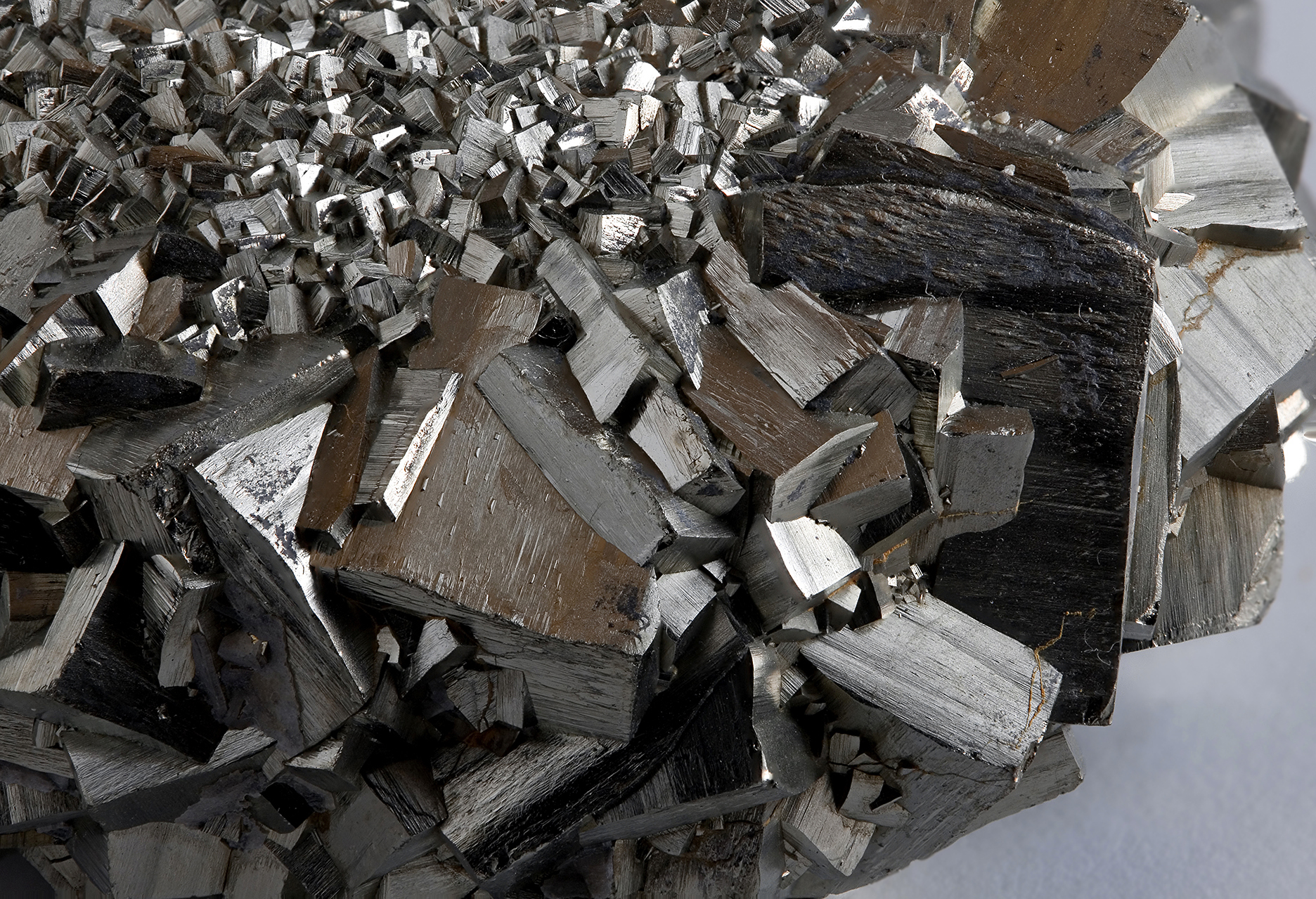
Pyrite has a metallic lustre.

Lustre indicates how light reflects from the mineral's surface, with regard to its quality and intensity. There are numerous qualitative terms used to describe this property, which are split into metallic and non-metallic categories. Metallic and sub-metallic minerals have high reflectivity like metal; examples of minerals with this lustre are galena and pyrite. Non-metallic lustres include: adamantine, such as in diamond; vitreous, which is a glassy lustre very common in silicate minerals; pearly, such as in talc and apophyllite; resinous, such as members of the garnet group; silky which is common in fibrous minerals such as asbestiform chrysotile.

The diaphaneity of a mineral describes the ability of light to pass through it. Transparent minerals do not diminish the intensity of light passing through them. An example of a transparent mineral is muscovite (potassium mica); some varieties are sufficiently clear to have been used for windows. Translucent minerals allow some light to pass, but less than those that are transparent. Jadeite and nephrite (mineral forms of jade are examples of minerals with this property). Minerals that do not allow light to pass are called opaque.

The diaphaneity of a mineral depends on the thickness of the sample. When a mineral is sufficiently thin (e.g., in a thin section for petrography), it may become transparent even if that property is not seen in a hand sample. In contrast, some minerals, such as hematite or pyrite, are opaque even in thin-section.

=== Colour and streak ===
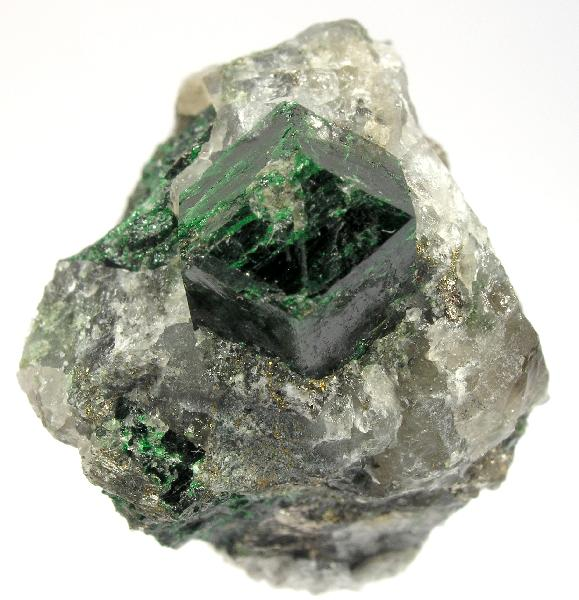
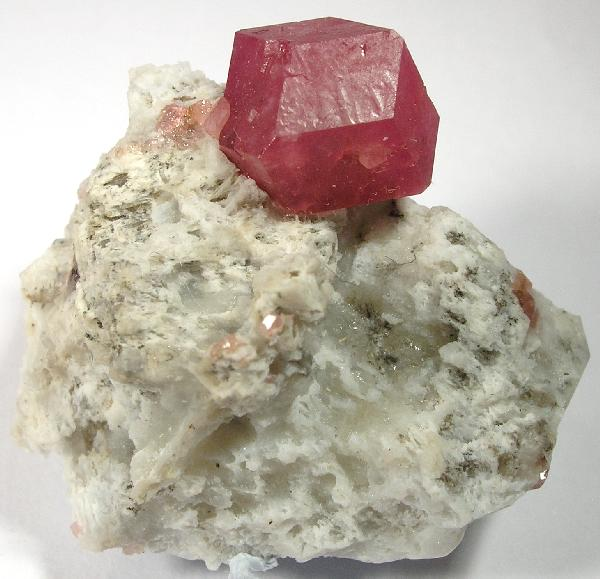
Colour is typically not a diagnostic property of minerals. Shown are green uvarovite (left) and red-pink grossular (right), both garnets. The diagnostic features would include dodecahedral crystals, resinous lustre, and hardness around 7.

Colour is the most obvious property of a mineral, but it is often non-diagnostic. It is caused by electromagnetic radiation interacting with electrons (except in the case of incandescence, which does not apply to minerals). Two broad classes of elements (idiochromatic and allochromatic) are defined with regard to their contribution to a mineral's colour: Idiochromatic elements are essential to a mineral's composition; their contribution to a mineral's colour is diagnostic. Examples of such minerals are malachite (green) and azurite (blue). In contrast, allochromatic elements in minerals are present in trace amounts as impurities. An example of such a mineral would be the ruby and sapphire varieties of the mineral corundum. The colours of pseudochromatic minerals are the result of interference of light waves. Examples include labradorite and bornite.

In addition to simple body colour, minerals can have various other distinctive optical properties, such as play of colours, asterism, chatoyancy, iridescence, tarnish, and pleochroism. Several of these properties involve variability in colour. Play of colour, such as in opal, results in the sample reflecting different colours as it is turned, while pleochroism describes the change in colour as light passes through a mineral in a different orientation. Iridescence is a variety of the play of colours where light scatters off a coating on the surface of crystal, cleavage planes, or off layers having minor gradations in chemistry. In contrast, the play of colours in opal is caused by light refracting from ordered microscopic silica spheres within its physical structure. Chatoyancy ("cat's eye") is the wavy banding of colour that is observed as the sample is rotated; asterism, a variety of chatoyancy, gives the appearance of a star on the mineral grain. The latter property is particularly common in gem-quality corundum.

The streak of a mineral refers to the colour of a mineral in powdered form, which may or may not be identical to its body colour. The most common way of testing this property is done with a streak plate, which is made out of porcelain and coloured either white or black. The streak of a mineral is independent of trace elements or any weathering surface. A common example of this property is illustrated with hematite, which is coloured black, silver or red in hand sample, but has a cherry-red to reddish-brown streak; or with chalcopyrite, which is brassy golden in colour and leaves a black streak. Streak is more often distinctive for metallic minerals, in contrast to non-metallic minerals whose body colour is created by allochromatic elements. Streak testing is constrained by the hardness of the mineral, as those harder than 7 powder the streak plate instead.

=== Cleavage, parting, fracture, and tenacity ===
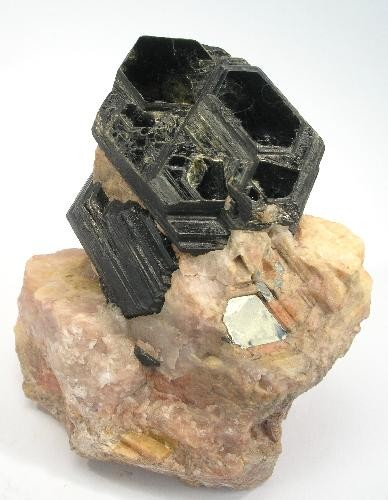
Perfect basal cleavage as seen in biotite (black), and good cleavage seen in the matrix (pink orthoclase).

By definition, minerals have a characteristic atomic arrangement. Weakness in this crystalline structure causes planes of weakness, and the breakage of a mineral along such planes is termed cleavage. The quality of cleavage can be described based on how cleanly and easily the mineral breaks; common descriptors, in order of decreasing quality, are "perfect", "good", "distinct", and "poor". In particularly transparent minerals, or in thin-section, cleavage can be seen as a series of parallel lines marking the planar surfaces when viewed from the side. Cleavage is not a universal property among minerals; for example, quartz, consisting of extensively interconnected silica tetrahedra, does not have a crystallographic weakness which would allow it to cleave. In contrast, micas, which have perfect basal cleavage, consist of sheets of silica tetrahedra which are very weakly held together.

As cleavage is a function of crystallography, there are a variety of cleavage types. Cleavage occurs typically in either one, two, three, four, or six directions. Basal cleavage in one direction is a distinctive property of the micas. Two-directional cleavage is described as prismatic, and occurs in minerals such as the amphiboles and pyroxenes. Minerals such as galena or halite have cubic (or isometric) cleavage in three directions, at 90°; when three directions of cleavage are present, but not at 90°, such as in calcite or rhodochrosite, it is termed rhombohedral cleavage. Octahedral cleavage (four directions) is present in fluorite and diamond, and sphalerite has six-directional dodecahedral cleavage.

Minerals with many cleavages might not break equally well in all of the directions; for example, calcite has good cleavage in three directions, but gypsum has perfect cleavage in one direction, and poor cleavage in two other directions. Angles between cleavage planes vary between minerals. For example, as the amphiboles are double-chain silicates and the pyroxenes are single-chain silicates, the angle between their cleavage planes is different. The pyroxenes cleave in two directions at approximately 90°, whereas the amphiboles distinctively cleave in two directions separated by approximately 120° and 60°. The cleavage angles can be measured with a contact goniometer, which is similar to a protractor.

Parting, sometimes called "false cleavage", is similar in appearance to cleavage but is instead produced by structural defects in the mineral, as opposed to systematic weakness. Parting varies from crystal to crystal of a mineral, whereas all crystals of a given mineral will cleave if the atomic structure allows for that property. In general, parting is caused by some stress applied to a crystal. The sources of the stresses include deformation (e.g. an increase in pressure), exsolution, or twinning. Minerals that often display parting include the pyroxenes, hematite, magnetite, and corundum.

When a mineral is broken in a direction that does not correspond to a plane of cleavage, it is termed to have been fractured. There are several types of uneven fracture. The classic example is conchoidal fracture, like that of quartz; rounded surfaces are created, which are marked by smooth curved lines. This type of fracture occurs only in very homogeneous minerals. Other types of fracture are fibrous, splintery, and hackly. The latter describes a break along a rough, jagged surface; an example of this property is found in native copper.

Tenacity is related to both cleavage and fracture. Whereas fracture and cleavage describes the surfaces that are created when a mineral is broken, tenacity describes how resistant a mineral is to such breaking. Minerals can be described as brittle, ductile, malleable, sectile, flexible, or elastic.

=== Specific gravity ===
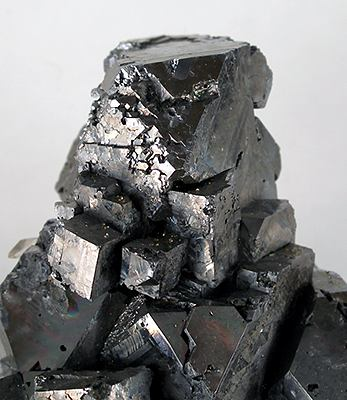
Galena, PbS, is a mineral with a high specific gravity.

Specific gravity numerically describes the density of a mineral. The dimensions of density are mass divided by volume with units: kg/m^{3} or g/cm^{3}. Specific gravity is defined as the density of the mineral divided by the density of water at 4 °C and thus is a dimensionless quantity, identical in all unit systems. It can be measured as the quotient of the mass of the sample and difference between the weight of the sample in air and its corresponding weight in water. Among most minerals, this property is not diagnostic. Rock forming minerals – typically silicates or occasionally carbonates – have a specific gravity of 2.5–3.5.

High specific gravity is a diagnostic property of a mineral. A variation in chemistry (and consequently, mineral class) correlates to a change in specific gravity. Among more common minerals, oxides and sulfides tend to have a higher specific gravity as they include elements with higher atomic mass. A generalization is that minerals with metallic or adamantine lustre tend to have higher specific gravities than those having a non-metallic to dull lustre. For example, hematite, Fe_{2}O_{3}, has a specific gravity of 5.26 while galena, PbS, has a specific gravity of 7.2–7.6, which is a result of their high iron and lead content, respectively. A very high specific gravity is characteristic of native metals; for example, kamacite, an iron-nickel alloy common in iron meteorites has a specific gravity of 7.9, and gold has an observed specific gravity between 15 and 19.3.

=== Other properties ===
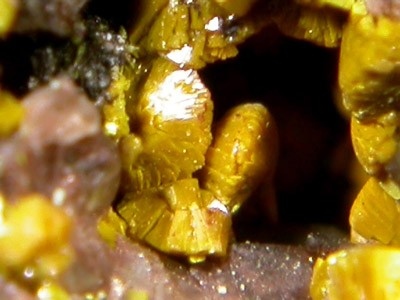
Carnotite (yellow) is a radioactive uranium-bearing mineral.

Other properties can be used to diagnose minerals. These are less general, and apply to specific minerals.

Dropping dilute acid (often 10% HCl) onto a mineral aids in distinguishing carbonates from other mineral classes. The acid reacts with the carbonate ([CO_{3}]^{2−}) group, which causes the affected area to effervesce, giving off carbon dioxide gas. This test can be further expanded to test the mineral in its original crystal form or powdered form. An example of this test is done when distinguishing calcite from dolomite, especially within the rocks (limestone and dolomite respectively). Calcite immediately effervesces in acid, whereas acid must be applied to powdered dolomite (often to a scratched surface in a rock), for it to effervesce. Zeolite minerals will not effervesce in acid; instead, they become frosted after 5–10 minutes, and if left in acid for a day, they dissolve or become a silica gel.

Magnetism is a very conspicuous property of a few minerals. Among common minerals, magnetite exhibits this property strongly, and magnetism is also present, albeit not as strongly, in pyrrhotite and ilmenite. Some minerals exhibit electrical properties – for example, quartz is piezoelectric – but electrical properties are rarely used as diagnostic criteria for minerals because of incomplete data and natural variation.

Minerals can also be tested for taste or smell. Halite, NaCl, is table salt; its potassium-bearing counterpart, sylvite, has a pronounced bitter taste. Sulfides have a characteristic smell, especially as samples are fractured, reacting, or powdered.

Radioactivity is a rare property found in minerals containing radioactive elements. The radioactive elements could be a defining constituent, such as uranium in uraninite, autunite, and carnotite, or present as trace impurities, as in zircon. The decay of a radioactive element damages the mineral crystal structure rendering it locally amorphous (metamict state); the optical result, termed a radioactive halo or pleochroic halo, is observable with various techniques, such as thin-section petrography.

== Classification ==
=== Earliest classifications ===
In 315 BCE, Theophrastus presented his classification of minerals in his treatise On Stones. His classification was influenced by the ideas of his teachers Plato and Aristotle. Theophrastus classified minerals as stones, earths or metals.

Georgius Agricola's classification of minerals in his book De Natura Fossilium, published in 1546, divided minerals into three types of substance: simple (stones, earths, metals, and congealed juices), compound (intimately mixed) and composite (separable).

=== Linnaeus ===
An early classification of minerals was given by Carl Linnaeus in his seminal 1735 book Systema Naturae. He divided the natural world into three kingdoms – plants, animals, and minerals – and classified each with the same hierarchy. In descending order, these were Phylum, Class, Order, Family, Tribe, Genus, and Species. However, while his system was justified by Charles Darwin's theory of species formation and has been largely adopted and expanded by biologists in the following centuries (who still use his Greek- and Latin-based binomial naming scheme), it had little success among mineralogists (although each distinct mineral is still formally referred to as a mineral species).

=== Modern classification ===
Minerals are classified by variety, species, series and group, in order of increasing generality. The basic level of definition is that of mineral species, each of which is distinguished from the others by unique chemical and physical properties. For example, quartz is defined by its formula, SiO_{2}, and a specific crystalline structure that distinguishes it from other minerals with the same chemical formula (termed polymorphs). When there exists a range of composition between two minerals species, a mineral series is defined. For example, the biotite series is represented by variable amounts of the endmembers phlogopite, siderophyllite, annite, and eastonite. In contrast, a mineral group is a grouping of mineral species with some common chemical properties that share a crystal structure. The pyroxene group has a common formula of XY(Si,Al)_{2}O_{6}, where X and Y are both cations, with X typically bigger than Y; the pyroxenes are single-chain silicates that crystallize in either the orthorhombic or monoclinic crystal systems. Finally, a mineral variety is a specific type of mineral species that differs by some physical characteristic, such as colour or crystal habit. An example is amethyst, which is a purple variety of quartz.

Two common classifications, Dana and Strunz, are used for minerals; both rely on composition, specifically with regard to important chemical groups, and structure. James Dwight Dana, a leading geologist of his time, first published his System of Mineralogy in 1837; as of August 2026, it is in its eighth edition. The Dana classification assigns a four-part number to a mineral species. Its class number is based on important compositional groups; the type gives the ratio of cations to anions in the mineral, and the last two numbers group minerals by structural similarity within a given type or class. The less commonly used Strunz classification, named for German mineralogist Karl Hugo Strunz, is based on the Dana system, but combines both chemical and structural criteria, the latter with regard to distribution of chemical bonds.

As the composition of the Earth's crust is dominated by silicon and oxygen, silicates are by far the most important class of minerals in terms of rock formation and diversity. However, non-silicate minerals are of great economic importance, especially as ores. Non-silicate minerals are subdivided into several other classes by their dominant chemistry, which includes native elements, sulfides, halides, oxides and hydroxides, carbonates and nitrates, borates, sulfates, phosphates, and organic compounds. Most non-silicate mineral species are rare (constituting in total 8% of the Earth's crust), although some are relatively common, such as calcite, pyrite, magnetite, and hematite. There are two major structural styles observed in non-silicates: close-packing and silicate-like linked tetrahedra. Close-packed structures are a way to densely pack atoms while minimizing interstitial space. Hexagonal close-packing involves stacking layers where every other layer is the same ("ababab"), whereas cubic close-packing involves stacking groups of three layers ("abcabcabc"). Analogues to linked silica tetrahedra include SO^{4−}_{4} (sulfate), PO^{4−}_{4} (phosphate), AsO^{4−}_{4} (arsenate), and VO^{4−}_{4} (vanadate) structures. The non-silicates have great economic importance, as they concentrate elements more than the silicate minerals do.

The largest grouping of minerals by far are the silicates; most rocks are composed of greater than 95% silicate minerals, and over 90% of the Earth's crust is composed of these minerals. The two main constituents of silicates are silicon and oxygen, which are the two most abundant elements in the Earth's crust. Other common elements in silicate minerals correspond to other common elements in the Earth's crust, such as aluminium, magnesium, iron, calcium, sodium, and potassium. Some important rock-forming silicates include the feldspars, quartz, olivines, pyroxenes, amphiboles, garnets, and micas.

=== Silicates ===
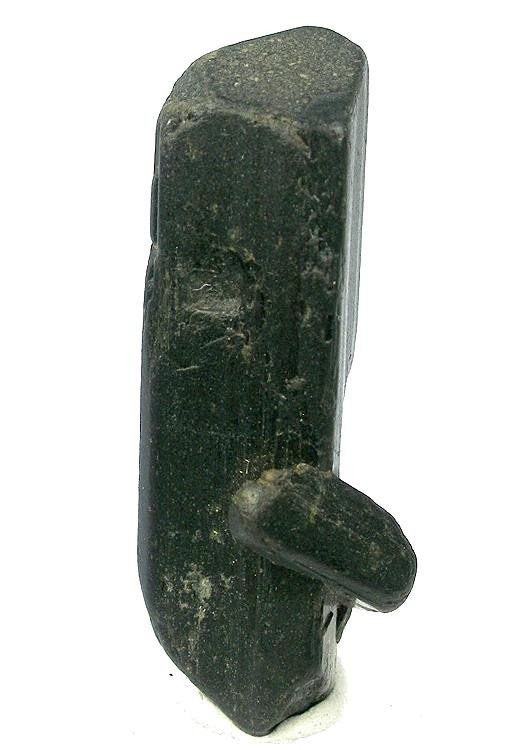
Aegirine, an iron-sodium clinopyroxene, is part of the inosilicate subclass.

The base unit of a silicate mineral is the [SiO_{4}]^{4−} tetrahedron. In the vast majority of cases, silicon is in four-fold or tetrahedral coordination with oxygen. In very high-pressure situations, silicon will be in six-fold or octahedral coordination, such as in the perovskite structure or the quartz polymorph stishovite (SiO_{2}). In the latter case, the mineral no longer has a silicate structure, but that of rutile (TiO_{2}), and its associated group, which are simple oxides. These silica tetrahedra are then polymerized to some degree to create various structures, such as one-dimensional chains, two-dimensional sheets, and three-dimensional frameworks. The basic silicate mineral where no polymerization of the tetrahedra has occurred requires other elements to balance out the base 4- charge. In other silicate structures, different combinations of elements are required to balance out the resultant negative charge. It is common for the Si^{4+} to be substituted by Al^{3+} because of similarity in ionic radius and charge; in those cases, the [AlO_{4}]^{5−} tetrahedra form the same structures as do the unsubstituted tetrahedra, but their charge-balancing requirements are different.

The degree of polymerization can be described by both the structure formed and how many tetrahedral corners (or coordinating oxygens) are shared (for aluminium and silicon in tetrahedral sites):

Orthosilicates (or nesosilicates)
Have no linking of polyhedra, thus tetrahedra share no corners.
Disilicates (or sorosilicates)
Have two tetrahedra sharing one oxygen atom.
Inosilicates are chain silicates
Single-chain silicates have two shared corners, whereas double-chain silicates have two or three shared corners.
Phyllosilicates
Have a sheet structure which requires three shared oxygens; in the case of double-chain silicates, some tetrahedra must share two corners instead of three as otherwise a sheet structure would result.
Framework silicates (or tectosilicates)
Have tetrahedra that share all four corners.
Ring silicates (or cyclosilicates)
Only need tetrahedra to share two corners to form the cyclical structure.

The silicate subclasses are described below in order of decreasing polymerization.

==== Tectosilicates ====
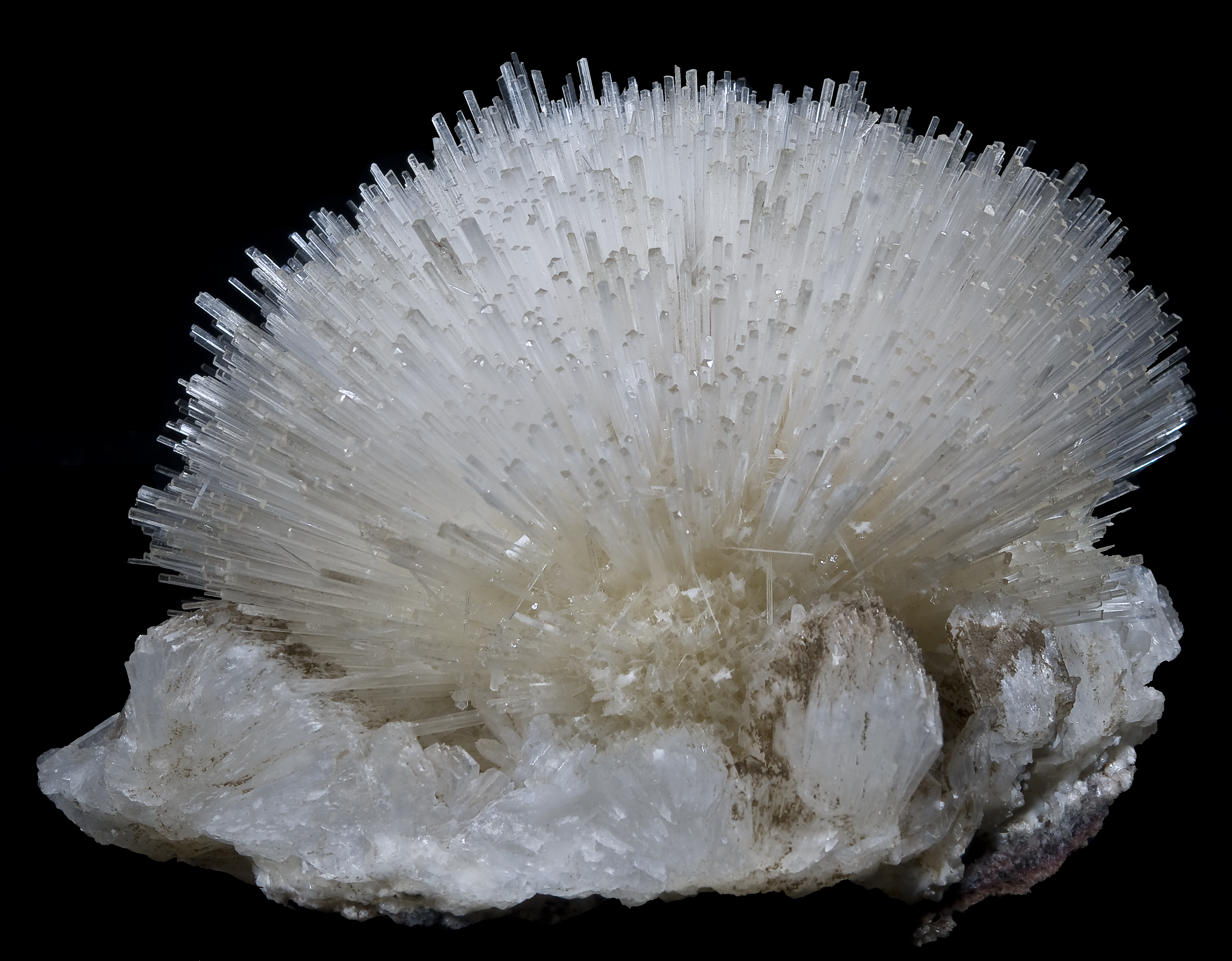
Natrolite is a mineral series in the zeolite group; this sample has a very prominent acicular crystal habit.

Tectosilicates, also known as framework silicates, have the highest degree of polymerization. With all corners of a tetrahedra shared, the silicon:oxygen ratio becomes 1:2. Examples are quartz, the feldspars, feldspathoids, and the zeolites. Framework silicates tend to be particularly chemically stable as a result of strong covalent bonds.

Forming 12% of the Earth's crust, quartz (SiO_{2}) is the most abundant mineral species. It is characterized by its high chemical and physical resistivity. Quartz has several polymorphs, including tridymite and cristobalite at high temperatures, high-pressure coesite, and ultra-high pressure stishovite. The latter mineral can only be formed on Earth by meteorite impacts, and its structure has been compressed so much that it has changed from a silicate structure to that of rutile (TiO_{2}). The silica polymorph that is most stable at the Earth's surface is α-quartz. Its counterpart, β-quartz, is present only at high temperatures and pressures (changes to α-quartz below 573 °C at 1 bar). These two polymorphs differ by a "kinking" of bonds; this change in structure gives β-quartz greater symmetry than α-quartz, and they are thus also called high quartz (β) and low quartz (α).

Feldspars are the most abundant group in the Earth's crust, at about 50%. In the feldspars, Al^{3+} substitutes for Si^{4+}, which creates a charge imbalance that must be accounted for by the addition of cations. The base structure becomes either [AlSi_{3}O_{8}]^{−} or [Al_{2}Si_{2}O_{8}]^{2−} There are 22 mineral species of feldspars, subdivided into two major subgroups – alkali and plagioclase – and two less common groups – celsian and banalsite. The alkali feldspars are most commonly in a series between potassium-rich orthoclase and sodium-rich albite; in the case of plagioclase, the most common series ranges from albite to calcium-rich anorthite. Crystal twinning is common in feldspars, especially polysynthetic twins in plagioclase and Carlsbad twins in alkali feldspars. If the latter subgroup cools slowly from a melt, it forms exsolution lamellae because the two components – orthoclase and albite – are unstable in solid solution. Exsolution can be on a scale from microscopic to readily observable in hand-sample; perthitic texture forms when Na-rich feldspar exsolve in a K-rich host. The opposite texture (antiperthitic), where K-rich feldspar exsolves in a Na-rich host, is very rare.

Feldspathoids are structurally similar to feldspar, but differ in that they form in Si-deficient conditions, which allows for further substitution by Al^{3+}. As a result, feldspathoids are almost never found in association with quartz. A common example of a feldspathoid is nepheline ((Na, K)AlSiO_{4}); compared to alkali feldspar, nepheline has an Al_{2}O_{3}:SiO_{2} ratio of 1:2, as opposed to 1:6 in alkali feldspar. Zeolites often have distinctive crystal habits, occurring in needles, plates, or blocky masses. They form in the presence of water at low temperatures and pressures, and have channels and voids in their structure. Zeolites have several industrial applications, especially in waste water treatment.

==== Phyllosilicates ====
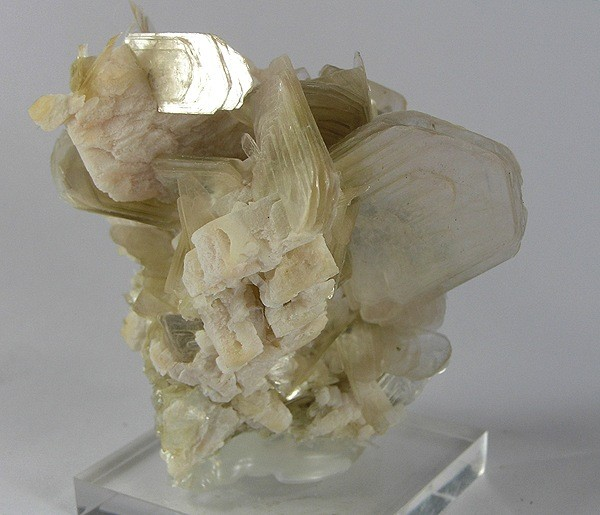
Muscovite, a mineral species in the mica group, within the phyllosilicate subclass

Phyllosilicates consist of sheets of polymerized tetrahedra. They are bound at three oxygen sites, which gives a characteristic silicon:oxygen ratio of 2:5. Important examples include the mica, chlorite, and the kaolinite-serpentine groups. In addition to the tetrahedra, phyllosilicates have a sheet of octahedra (elements in six-fold coordination by oxygen) that balance out the basic tetrahedra, which have a negative charge (e.g. [Si_{4}O_{10}]^{4−}) These tetrahedra (T) and octahedra (O) sheets are stacked in a variety of combinations to create phyllosilicate layers. Within an octahedral sheet, there are three octahedral sites in a unit structure; however, not all of the sites may be occupied. In that case, the mineral is termed dioctahedral, whereas in other case it is termed trioctahedral. The layers are weakly bound by van der Waals forces, hydrogen bonds, or sparse ionic bonds, which causes a crystallographic weakness, in turn leading to a prominent basal cleavage among the phyllosilicates.

The kaolinite-serpentine group consists of T-O stacks (the 1:1 clay minerals); their hardness ranges from 2 to 4, as the sheets are held by hydrogen bonds. The 2:1 clay minerals (pyrophyllite-talc) consist of T-O-T stacks, but they are softer (hardness from 1 to 2), as they are instead held together by van der Waals forces. These two groups of minerals are subgrouped by octahedral occupation; specifically, kaolinite and pyrophyllite are dioctahedral whereas serpentine and talc trioctahedral.

Micas are also T-O-T-stacked phyllosilicates, but differ from the other T-O-T and T-O-stacked subclass members in that they incorporate aluminium into the tetrahedral sheets (clay minerals have Al^{3+} in octahedral sites). Common examples of micas are muscovite, and the biotite series. Mica T-O-T layers are bonded together by metal ions, giving them a greater hardness than other phyllosilicate minerals, though they retain perfect basal cleavage. The chlorite group is related to mica group, but a brucite-like (Mg(OH)_{2}) layer between the T-O-T stacks.

Because of their chemical structure, phyllosilicates typically have flexible, elastic, transparent layers that are electrical insulators and can be split into very thin flakes. Micas can be used in electronics as insulators, in construction, as optical filler, or even cosmetics. Chrysotile, a species of serpentine, is the most common mineral species in industrial asbestos, as it is less dangerous in terms of health than the amphibole asbestos.

==== Inosilicates ====
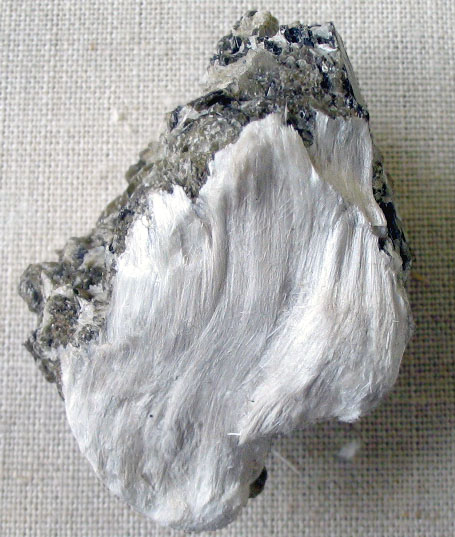
Asbestiform tremolite, part of the amphibole group in the inosilicate subclass

Inosilicates consist of tetrahedra repeatedly bonded in chains. These chains can be single, where a tetrahedron is bound to two others to form a continuous chain; alternatively, two chains can be merged to create double-chain silicates. Single-chain silicates have a silicon:oxygen ratio of 1:3 (e.g. [Si_{2}O_{6}]^{4−}), whereas the double-chain variety has a ratio of 4:11, e.g. [Si_{8}O_{22}]^{12−}. Inosilicates contain two important rock-forming mineral groups; single-chain silicates are most commonly pyroxenes, while double-chain silicates are often amphiboles. Higher-order chains exist (e.g. three-member, four-member, five-member chains, etc.) but they are rare.

The pyroxene group consists of 21 mineral species. Pyroxenes have a general structure formula of XY(Si_{2}O_{6}), where X is an octahedral site, while Y can vary in coordination number from six to eight. Most varieties of pyroxene consist of permutations of Ca^{2+}, Fe^{2+} and Mg^{2+} to balance the negative charge on the backbone. Pyroxenes are common in the Earth's crust (about 10%) and are a key constituent of mafic igneous rocks.

Amphiboles have great variability in chemistry, described variously as a "mineralogical garbage can" or a "mineralogical shark swimming a sea of elements". The backbone of the amphiboles is the [Si_{8}O_{22}]^{12−}; it is balanced by cations in three possible positions, although the third position is not always used, and one element can occupy both remaining ones. Finally, the amphiboles are usually hydrated, that is, they have a hydroxyl group ([OH]^{−}), although it can be replaced by a fluoride, a chloride, or an oxide ion. Because of the variable chemistry, there are over 80 species of amphibole, although variations, as in the pyroxenes, most commonly involve mixtures of Ca^{2+}, Fe^{2+} and Mg^{2+}. Several amphibole mineral species can have an asbestiform crystal habit. These asbestos minerals form long, thin, flexible, and strong fibres, which are electrical insulators, chemically inert and heat-resistant; as such, they have several applications, especially in construction materials. However, asbestos are known carcinogens, and cause various other illnesses, such as asbestosis; amphibole asbestos (anthophyllite, tremolite, actinolite, grunerite, and riebeckite) are considered more dangerous than chrysotile serpentine asbestos.

==== Cyclosilicates ====
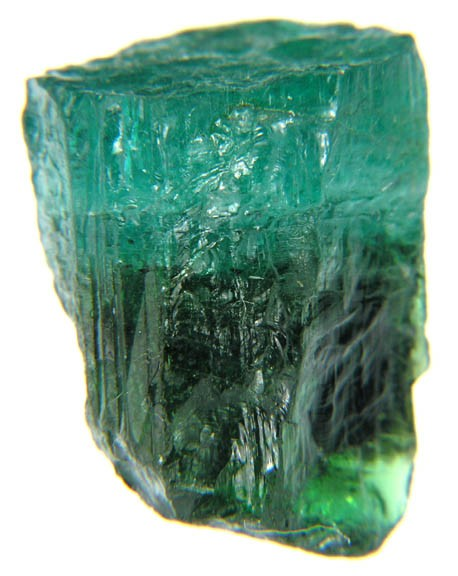
An example of elbaite, a species of tourmaline, with distinctive colour banding.

Cyclosilicates, or ring silicates, have a ratio of silicon to oxygen of 1:3. Six-member rings are most common, with a base structure of [Si_{6}O_{18}]^{12−}; examples include the tourmaline group and beryl. Other ring structures exist, with 3, 4, 8, 9, 12 having been described. Cyclosilicates tend to be strong, with elongated, striated crystals.

Tourmalines have a very complex chemistry that can be described by a general formula XY_{3}Z_{6}(BO_{3})_{3}T_{6}O_{18}V_{3}W. The T_{6}O_{18} is the basic ring structure, where T is usually Si^{4+}, but substitutable by Al_{3+} or B^{3+}. Tourmalines can be subgrouped by the occupancy of the X site, and from there further subdivided by the chemistry of the W site. The Y and Z sites can accommodate a variety of cations, especially various transition metals; this variability in structural transition metal content gives the tourmaline group greater variability in colour. Other cyclosilicates include beryl, Al_{2}Be_{3}Si_{6}O_{18}, whose varieties include the gemstones emerald (green) and aquamarine (bluish). Cordierite is structurally similar to beryl, and is a common metamorphic mineral.

==== Sorosilicates ====
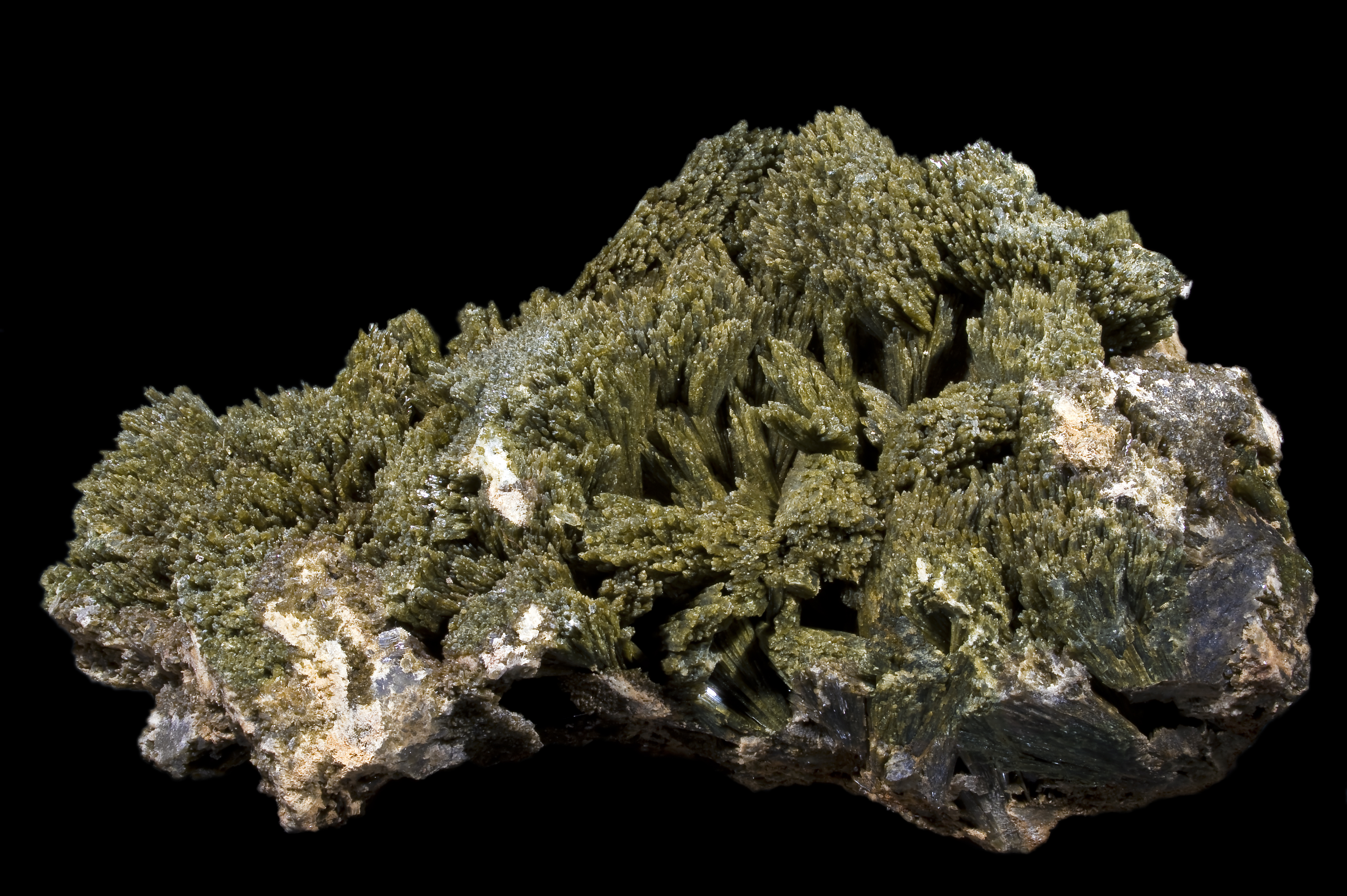
Epidote often has a distinctive pistachio-green colour.

Sorosilicates, also termed disilicates, have tetrahedron-tetrahedron bonding at one oxygen, which results in a 2:7 ratio of silicon to oxygen. The resultant common structural element is the [Si_{2}O_{7}]^{6−} group. The most common disilicates by far are members of the epidote group. Epidotes are found in variety of geologic settings, ranging from mid-ocean ridge to granites to metapelites. Epidotes are built around the structure [(SiO_{4})(Si_{2}O_{7})]^{10−} structure; for example, the mineral species epidote has calcium, aluminium, and ferric iron to charge balance: Ca_{2}Al_{2}(Fe^{3+}, Al)(SiO_{4})(Si_{2}O_{7})O(OH). The presence of iron as Fe^{3+} and Fe^{2+} helps buffer oxygen fugacity, which in turn is a significant factor in petrogenesis.

Other examples of sorosilicates include lawsonite, a metamorphic mineral forming in the blueschist facies (subduction zone setting with low temperature and high pressure), vesuvianite, which takes up a significant amount of calcium in its chemical structure.

==== Orthosilicates ====
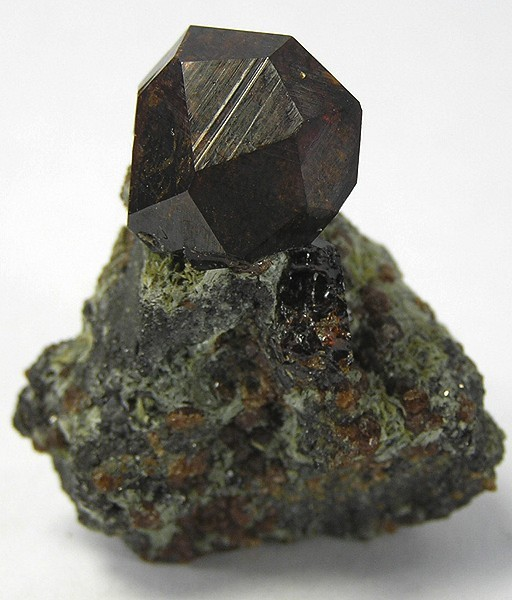
Black andradite, an end-member of the orthosilicate garnet group.

Orthosilicates consist of isolated tetrahedra that are charge-balanced by other cations. Also termed nesosilicates, this type of silicate has a silicon:oxygen ratio of 1:4 (e.g. SiO_{4}). Typical orthosilicates tend to form blocky equant crystals, and are fairly hard. Several rock-forming minerals are part of this subclass, such as the aluminosilicates, the olivine group, and the garnet group.

The aluminosilicates –bkyanite, andalusite, and sillimanite, all Al_{2}SiO_{5} – are structurally composed of one [SiO_{4}]^{4−} tetrahedron, and one Al^{3+} in octahedral coordination. The remaining Al^{3+} can be in six-fold coordination (kyanite), five-fold (andalusite) or four-fold (sillimanite); which mineral forms in a given environment is depend on pressure and temperature conditions. In the olivine structure, the main olivine series of (Mg, Fe)_{2}SiO_{4} consist of magnesium-rich forsterite and iron-rich fayalite. Both iron and magnesium are in octahedral by oxygen. Other mineral species having this structure exist, such as tephroite, Mn_{2}SiO_{4}. The garnet group has a general formula of X_{3}Y_{2}(SiO_{4})_{3}, where X is a large eight-fold coordinated cation, and Y is a smaller six-fold coordinated cation. There are six ideal endmembers of garnet, split into two group. The pyralspite garnets have Al^{3+} in the Y position: pyrope (Mg_{3}Al_{2}(SiO_{4})_{3}), almandine (Fe_{3}Al_{2}(SiO_{4})_{3}), and spessartine (Mn_{3}Al_{2}(SiO_{4})_{3}). The ugrandite garnets have Ca^{2+} in the X position: uvarovite (Ca_{3}Cr_{2}(SiO_{4})_{3}), grossular (Ca_{3}Al_{2}(SiO_{4})_{3}) and andradite (Ca_{3}Fe_{2}(SiO_{4})_{3}). While there are two subgroups of garnet, solid solutions exist between all six end-members.

Other orthosilicates include zircon, staurolite, and topaz. Zircon (ZrSiO_{4}) is useful in geochronology as U^{6+} can substitute for Zr^{4+}; furthermore, because of its very resistant structure, it is difficult to reset it as a chronometer. Staurolite is a common metamorphic intermediate-grade index mineral. It has a particularly complicated crystal structure that was only fully described in 1986. Topaz (Al_{2}SiO_{4}(F, OH)_{2}, often found in granitic pegmatites associated with tourmaline, is a common gemstone mineral.

=== Non-silicates ===
==== Native elements ====
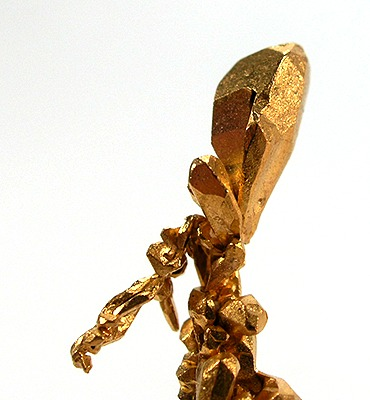
Native gold. Rare specimen of stout crystals growing off of a central stalk, size 3.7 x 1.1 x 0.4 cm, from Venezuela.

Native elements are those that are not chemically bonded to other elements. This mineral group includes native metals, semi-metals, and non-metals, and various alloys and solid solutions. The metals are held together by metallic bonding, which confers distinctive physical properties such as their shiny metallic lustre, ductility and malleability, and electrical conductivity. Native elements are subdivided into groups by their structure or chemical attributes.

The gold group, with a cubic close-packed structure, includes metals such as gold, silver, and copper. The platinum group is similar in structure to the gold group. The iron-nickel group is characterized by several iron-nickel alloy species. Two examples are kamacite and taenite, which are found in iron meteorites; these species differ by the amount of Ni in the alloy; kamacite has less than 5–7% nickel and is a variety of native iron, whereas the nickel content of taenite ranges from 7–37%. Arsenic group minerals consist of semi-metals, which have only some metallic traits; for example, they lack the malleability of metals. Native carbon occurs in two allotropes, graphite and diamond; the latter forms at very high pressure in the mantle, which gives it a much stronger structure than graphite.

==== Sulfides ====
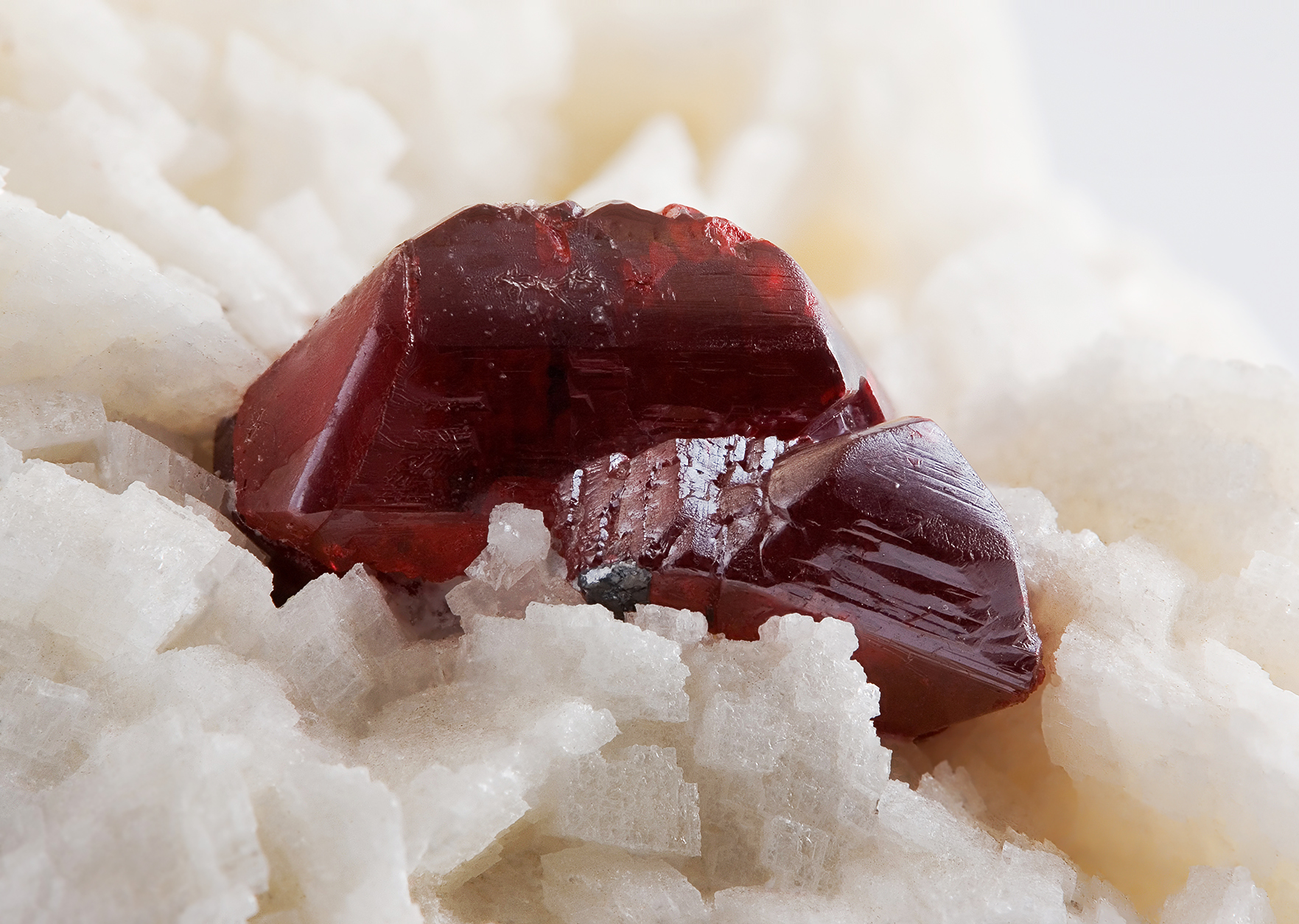
Red cinnabar (HgS), a mercury ore, on dolomite.

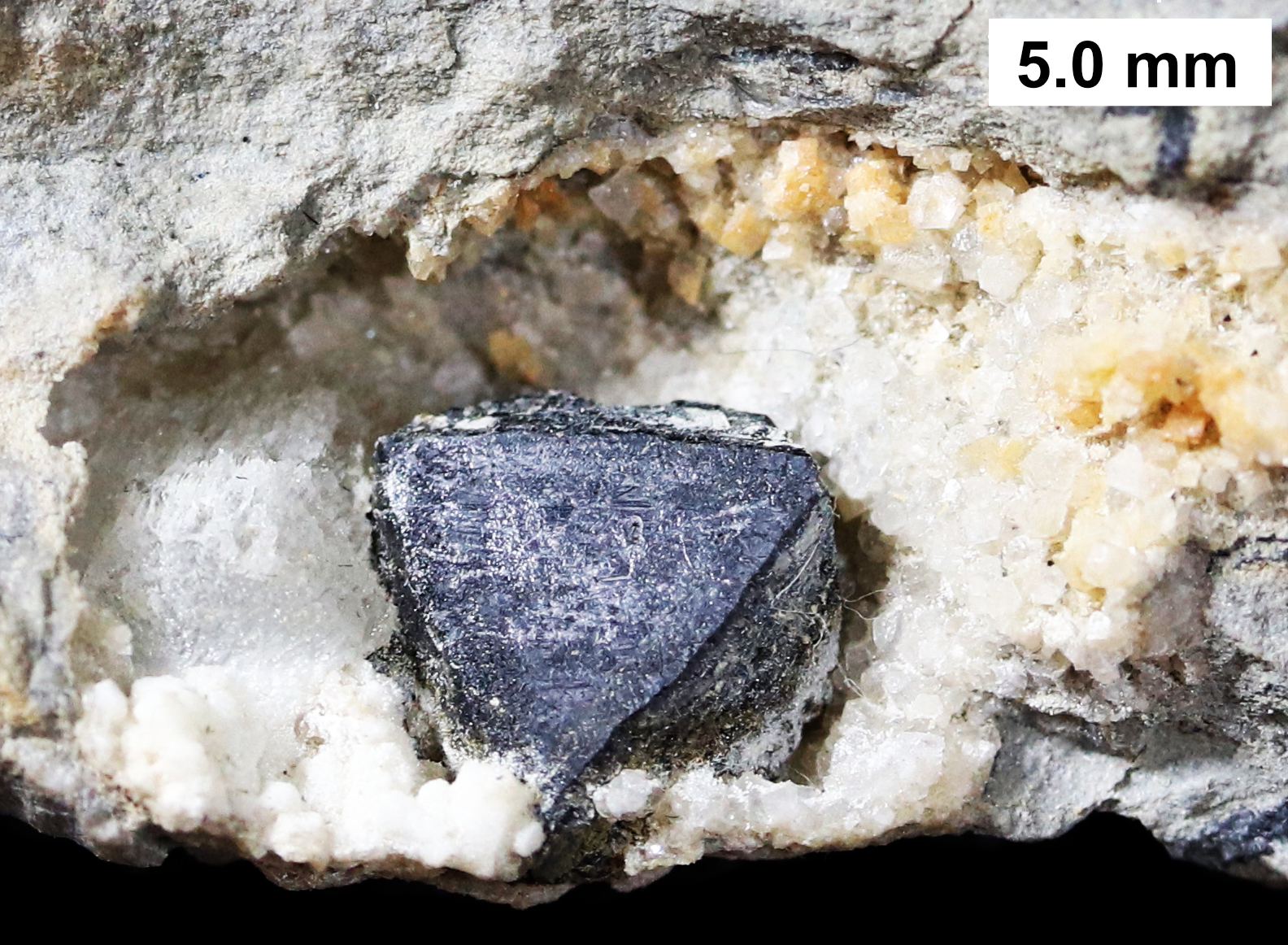
Sphalerite crystal partially encased in calcite from the Devonian Milwaukee Formation of Wisconsin

The sulfide minerals are chemical compounds of one or more metals or semimetals with a chalcogen or pnictogen, of which sulfur is most common. Tellurium, arsenic, or selenium can substitute for the sulfur. Sulfides tend to be soft, brittle minerals with a high specific gravity. Many powdered sulfides, such as pyrite, have a sulfurous smell when powdered. Sulfides are susceptible to weathering, and many readily dissolve in water; these dissolved minerals can be later redeposited, which creates enriched secondary ore deposits. Sulfides are classified by the ratio of the metal or semimetal to the sulfur, such as M:S equal to 2:1, or 1:1. Many sulfide minerals are economically important as metal ores; examples include sphalerite (ZnS), an ore of zinc, galena (PbS), an ore of lead, cinnabar (HgS), an ore of mercury, and molybdenite (MoS_{2}, an ore of molybdenum. Pyrite (FeS_{2}), is the most commonly occurring sulfide, and can be found in most geological environments. It is not, however, an ore of iron, but can be instead oxidized to produce sulfuric acid. Related to the sulfides are the rare sulfosalts, in which a metallic element is bonded to sulfur and a semimetal such as antimony, arsenic, or bismuth. Like the sulfides, sulfosalts are typically soft, heavy, and brittle minerals.

==== Oxides ====
Oxide minerals are divided into three categories: simple oxides, hydroxides, and multiple oxides. Simple oxides are characterized by O^{2−} as the main anion and primarily ionic bonding. They can be further subdivided by the ratio of oxygen to the cations. The periclase group consists of minerals with a 1:1 ratio. Oxides with a 2:1 ratio include cuprite (Cu_{2}O) and water ice. Corundum group minerals have a 2:3 ratio, and includes minerals such as corundum (Al_{2}O_{3}), and hematite (Fe_{2}O_{3}). Rutile group minerals have a ratio of 1:2; the eponymous species, rutile (TiO_{2}) is the chief ore of titanium; other examples include cassiterite (SnO_{2}; ore of tin), and pyrolusite (MnO_{2}; ore of manganese). In hydroxides, the dominant anion is the hydroxyl ion, OH^{−}. Bauxites are the chief aluminium ore, and are a heterogeneous mixture of the hydroxide minerals diaspore, gibbsite, and bohmite; they form in areas with a very high rate of chemical weathering (mainly tropical conditions). Finally, multiple oxides are compounds of two metals with oxygen. A major group within this class are the spinels, with a general formula of X^{2+}Y^{3+}_{2}O_{4}. Examples of species include spinel (MgAl_{2}O_{4}), chromite (FeCr_{2}O_{4}), and magnetite (Fe_{3}O_{4}). The latter is readily distinguishable by its strong magnetism, which occurs as it has iron in two oxidation states (Fe^{2+}Fe^{3+}_{2}O_{4}), which makes it a multiple oxide instead of a single oxide.

==== Halides ====
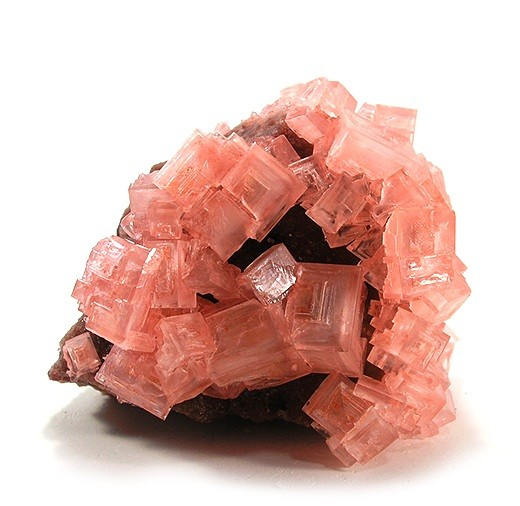
Pink cubic halite (NaCl; halide class) crystals on a nahcolite matrix (NaHCO_{3}; a carbonate, and mineral form of sodium bicarbonate, used as baking soda).

The halide minerals are compounds in which a halogen (fluorine, chlorine, iodine, or bromine) is the main anion. These minerals tend to be soft, weak, brittle, and water-soluble. Common examples of halides include halite (NaCl, table salt), sylvite (KCl), and fluorite (CaF_{2}). Halite and sylvite commonly form as evaporites, and can be dominant minerals in chemical sedimentary rocks. Cryolite, Na_{3}AlF_{6}, is a key mineral in the extraction of aluminium from bauxites; however, as the only significant occurrence at Ivittuut, Greenland, in a granitic pegmatite, was depleted, synthetic cryolite can be made from fluorite.

==== Carbonates ====
The carbonate minerals are those in which the main anionic group is carbonate, [CO_{3}]^{2−}. Carbonates tend to be brittle, many have rhombohedral cleavage, and all react with acid. Due to the last characteristic, field geologists often carry dilute hydrochloric acid to distinguish carbonates from non-carbonates. The reaction of acid with carbonates, most commonly found as the polymorph calcite and aragonite (CaCO_{3}), relates to the dissolution and precipitation of the mineral, which is a key in the formation of limestone caves, features within them such as stalactite and stalagmites, and karst landforms. Carbonates are most often formed as biogenic or chemical sediments in marine environments. The carbonate group is structurally a triangle, where a central C^{4+} cation is surrounded by three O^{2−} anions; different groups of minerals form from different arrangements of these triangles. The most common carbonate mineral is calcite, which is the primary constituent of sedimentary limestone and metamorphic marble. Calcite, CaCO_{3}, can have a significant percentage of magnesium substituting for calcium. Under high-Mg conditions, its polymorph aragonite will form instead; the marine geochemistry in this regard can be described as an aragonite or calcite sea, depending on which mineral preferentially forms. Dolomite is a double carbonate, with the formula CaMg(CO_{3})_{2}. Secondary dolomitization of limestone is common, in which calcite or aragonite are converted to dolomite; this reaction increases pore space (the unit cell volume of dolomite is 88% that of calcite), which can create a reservoir for oil and gas. These two mineral species are members of eponymous mineral groups: the calcite group includes carbonates with the general formula XCO_{3}, and the dolomite group constitutes minerals with the general formula XY(CO_{3})_{2}.

==== Sulfates ====
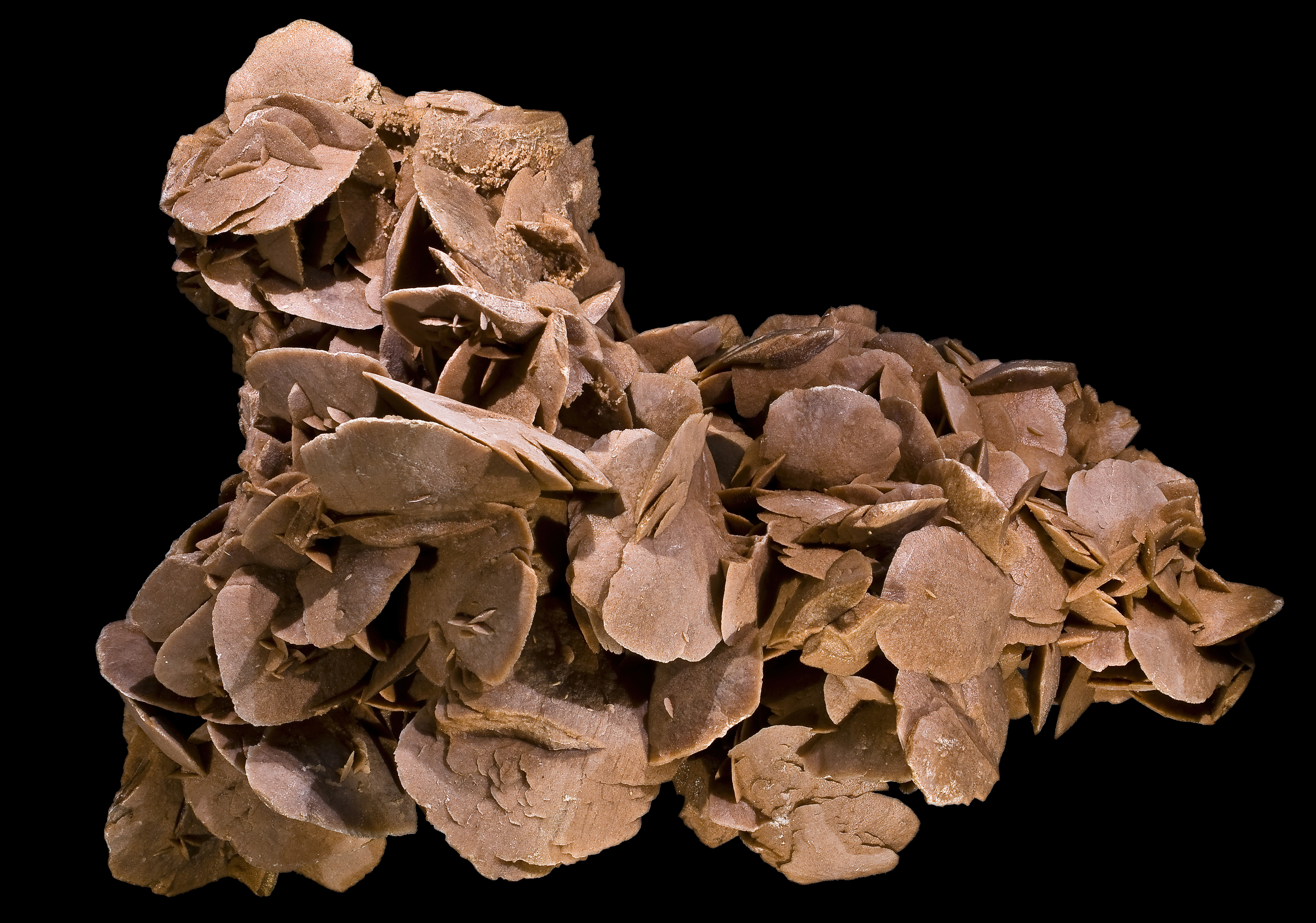
Gypsum desert rose

The sulfate minerals all contain the sulfate anion, [SO_{4}]^{2−}. They tend to be transparent to translucent, soft, and many are fragile. Sulfate minerals commonly form as evaporites, where they precipitate out of evaporating saline waters. Sulfates can also be found in hydrothermal vein systems associated with sulfides, or as oxidation products of sulfides. Sulfates can be subdivided into anhydrous and hydrous minerals. The most common hydrous sulfate by far is gypsum, CaSO_{4}⋅2H_{2}O. It forms as an evaporite, and is associated with other evaporites such as calcite and halite; if it incorporates sand grains as it crystallizes, gypsum can form desert roses. Gypsum has very low thermal conductivity and maintains a low temperature when heated as it loses that heat by dehydrating; as such, gypsum is used as an insulator in materials such as plaster and drywall. The anhydrous equivalent of gypsum is anhydrite; it can form directly from seawater in highly arid conditions. The barite group has the general formula XSO_{4}, where the X is a large 12-coordinated cation. Examples include barite (BaSO_{4}), celestine (SrSO_{4}), and anglesite (PbSO_{4}); anhydrite is not part of the barite group, as the smaller Ca^{2+} is only in eight-fold coordination.

==== Phosphates ====
The phosphate minerals are characterized by the tetrahedral [PO_{4}]^{3−} unit, although the structure can be generalized, and phosphorus is replaced by antimony, arsenic, or vanadium. The most common phosphate is the apatite group; common species within this group are fluorapatite (Ca_{5}(PO_{4})_{3}F), chlorapatite (Ca_{5}(PO_{4})_{3}Cl) and hydroxylapatite (Ca_{5}(PO_{4})_{3}(OH)). Minerals in this group are the main crystalline constituents of teeth and bones in vertebrates. The relatively abundant monazite group has a general structure of ATO_{4}, where T is phosphorus or arsenic, and A is often a rare-earth element (REE). Monazite is important in two ways: first, as a REE "sink", it can sufficiently concentrate these elements to become an ore; secondly, monazite group elements can incorporate relatively large amounts of uranium and thorium, which can be used in monazite geochronology to date the rock based on the decay of the U and Th to lead.

==== Organic minerals ====
The Strunz classification includes a class for organic minerals. These rare compounds contain organic carbon, but can be formed by a geologic process. For example, whewellite, CaC_{2}O_{4}⋅H_{2}O is an oxalate that can be deposited in hydrothermal ore veins. While hydrated calcium oxalate can be found in coal seams and other sedimentary deposits involving organic matter, the hydrothermal occurrence is not considered to be related to biological activity.

=== Recent advances ===
Mineral classification schemes and their definitions are evolving to match recent advances in mineral science. Recent changes have included the addition of an organic class, in both the new Dana and the Strunz classification schemes. The organic class includes a very rare group of minerals with hydrocarbons. The IMA Commission on New Minerals and Mineral Names adopted in 2009 a hierarchical scheme for the naming and classification of mineral groups and group names and established seven commissions and four working groups to review and classify minerals into an official listing of their published names. According to these new rules, "mineral species can be grouped in a number of different ways, on the basis of chemistry, crystal structure, occurrence, association, genetic history, or resource, for example, depending on the purpose to be served by the classification."

== Astrobiology ==
It has been suggested that biominerals could be important indicators of extraterrestrial life and thus could play an important role in the search for past or present life on Mars. Furthermore, organic components (biosignatures) that are often associated with biominerals are believed to play crucial roles in both pre-biotic and biotic reactions.

In January 2014, NASA reported that studies by the Curiosity and Opportunity rovers on Mars would search for evidence of ancient life, including a biosphere based on autotrophic, chemotrophic and/or chemolithoautotrophic microorganisms, as well as ancient water, including fluvio-lacustrine environments (plains related to ancient rivers or lakes) that may have been habitable. The search for evidence of habitability, taphonomy (related to fossils), and organic carbon on the planet Mars became a primary NASA objective.

== See also ==
- Agrominerals – Minerals important in agriculture and horticulture
- Amateur geology – Non-professional study and collecting of rocks and minerals
- Isomorphism (crystallography) – Similarity of symmetry and shape
- List of minerals
- List of minerals recognized by the International Mineralogical Association
- Mineral collecting – Hobby of collecting mineral specimens
- Mineral evolution – Increasing mineral diversity over time
- Mineral (nutrient), also known as dietary mineral – Chemical elements essential for life
- Polymorphism (materials science) – Ability of a solid material to exist in more than one form or crystal structure

== General references ==
- Busbey, A.B.; Coenraads, R.E.; Roots, D.; Willis, P. (2007). Rocks and Fossils. San Francisco: Fog City Press. ISBN 978-1-74089-632-0.
- Chesterman, C.W.; Lowe, K.E. (2008). Field guide to North American rocks and minerals. Toronto: Random House of Canada. ISBN 978-0-394-50269-4.
- Dyar, M.D.; Gunter, M.E. (2008). Mineralogy and Optical Mineralogy. Chantilly, VA: Mineralogical Society of America. ISBN 978-0-939950-81-2.
- Nesse, William D. (2000). Introduction to Mineralogy. New York: Oxford University Press. ISBN 978-0-19-510691-6.
