= Ferrous tungstate =

Names
- IUPAC names: Iron(2+) dioxido(dioxo)tungsten [ACD/IUPAC Name]; Tungsten, diolatodioxo-, iron(2+) salt (1:1) [ACD/Index Name]
- Other names Iron(II) tungstate

Identifiers
CAS Number	20405-35-0
3D model (JSmol)	Interactive image
ChemSpider	11214118
ECHA InfoCard	100.034.188
PubChem CID	22178528
CompTox Dashboard (EPA)	DTXSID00623278
- InChI: InChI=1S/Fe.4O.W/q+2;;;2*-1; Key: SSWAPIFTNSBXIS-UHFFFAOYSA-N
- SMILES: [O-][W](=O)(=O)[O-].[Fe+2]

Properties
Chemical formula	FeWO_{4}, sometimes expressed FeO_{4}W
Molar mass	303.68 g/mol
- Except where otherwise noted, data are given for materials in their standard state (at 25 °C [77 °F], 100 kPa). Infobox references

Ferrous tungstate (FeWO_{4}) is an inorganic compound, a tungstate of ferrous iron. It occurs naturally as ferberite.

== Synthesis ==
It can be synthesized from iron(III) chloride and sodium tungstate under hydrothermal conditions where the presence of L-cysteine reduces Fe^{3+} to Fe^{2+}.

FeWO_{4} crystals can be prepared by hydrothermal synthesis. Reagents used in this process are ethylenediaminetetraacetic acid disodium salt (Na_{2}EDTA) and hexamethylenetetramine (HMT). Na_{2}EDTA helps in controlling the morphology of FeWO_{4} crystals by binding to metal ions and preventing their premature precipitation and HMT acts as a pH buffer and a source of ammonia.
