= Hübnerite =

Oxide mineral

Hubnerite
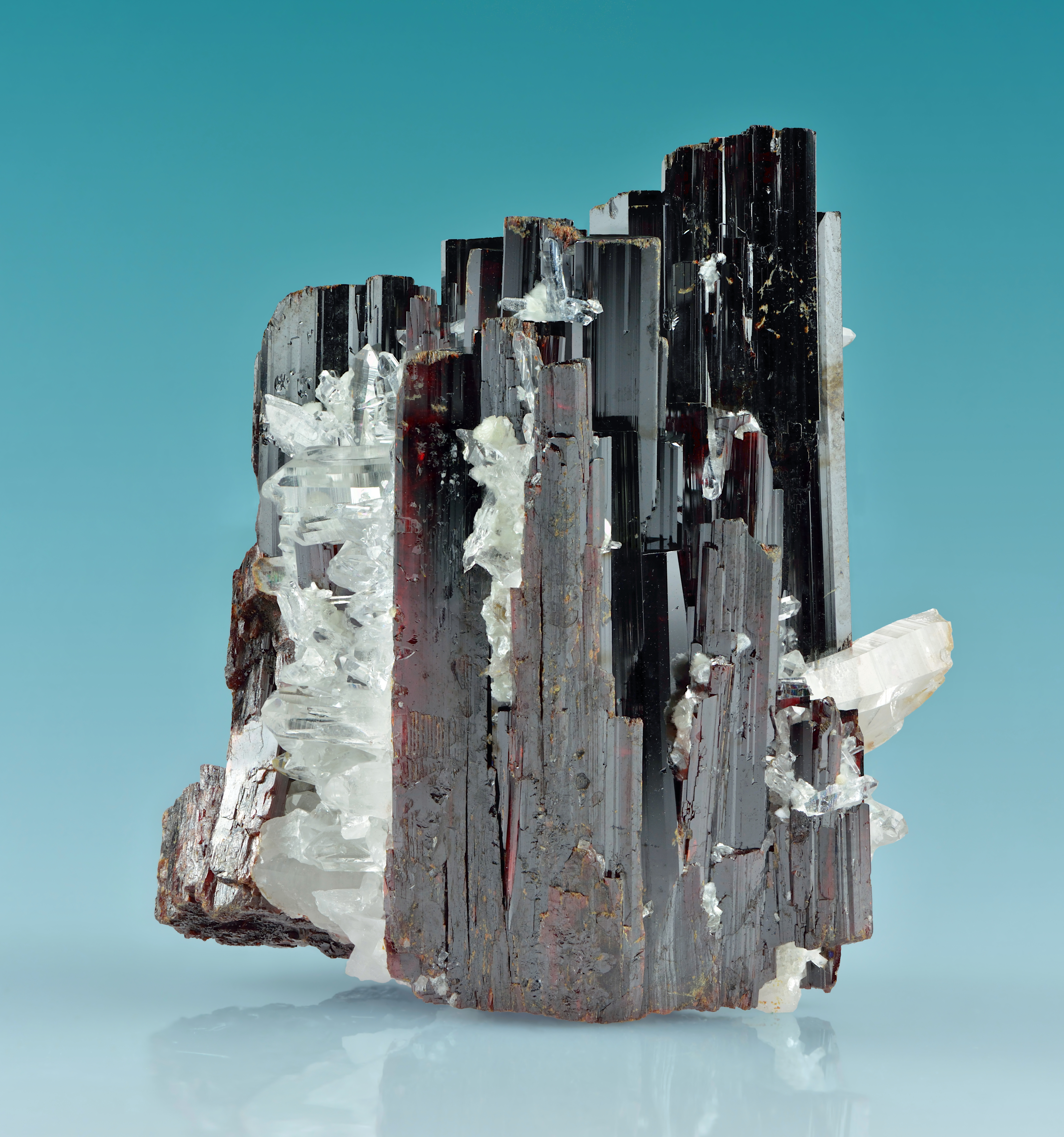

General
- Category: Oxide minerals
- Formula: MnWO_{4}
- IMA symbol: Hbr
- Strunz classification: 4.DB.30
- Crystal system: Monoclinic
- Crystal class: Prismatic (2/m) (same H-M symbol)
- Space group: P2_{1}/c
- Unit cell: a = 4.86, b = 5.78 c = 5.02 [Å]; β = 90.816°, Z = 4

Identification
- Color: Yellowish brown to reddish brown, blackish brown, black; Deep red internal reflections in reflected light
- Crystal habit: Prismatic striated crystals, tabular to flattened, in radiating groups
- Twinning: Contact twins
- Cleavage: Perfect on {010}
- Fracture: Irregular/uneven
- Tenacity: Brittle
- Mohs scale hardness: 4–4 1/2
- Luster: Metallic to adamantine towards resinous.
- Streak: Yellow to reddish brown, greenish gray
- Diaphaneity: Transparent to translucent
- Specific gravity: 7.12–7.18
- Optical properties: Biaxial (+)
- Refractive index: n_{α}=2.17–2.2, n_{β}=2.22, n_{γ}=2.3–2.32
- Birefringence: 0.1200–0.1300
- Pleochroism: Perceptible; X = yellow to green, red-orange; Y = yellowish brown to greenish yellow, red-orange to red; Z = green; brick-red to red
- 2V angle: 73° measured

Hübnerite or hubnerite is a mineral consisting of manganese tungsten oxide (chemical formula MnWO_{4}). It is the manganese endmember of the manganese–iron wolframite solid solution series. It forms reddish brown to black monoclinic prismatic submetallic crystals. The crystals are typically flattened and occur with fine striations. It has a high specific gravity of 7.15 and a Mohs hardness of 4.5. It is transparent to translucent with perfect cleavage. Refractive index values are n_{α} = 2.170 – 2.200, n_{β} = 2.220, and n_{γ} = 2.300 – 2.320.

Typical occurrence is in association with high-temperature hydrothermal vein deposits and altered granites with greisen, granite pegmatites and in alluvial deposits. It occurs associated with cassiterite, arsenopyrite, molybdenite, tourmaline, topaz, rhodochrosite and fluorite.

It was first described in 1865 for an occurrence in the Erie and Enterprise veins, Mammoth district, Nye County, Nevada, and named after the German mining engineer and metallurgist, Adolf Hübner from Freiberg, Saxony.

== Introduction ==
Hübnerite is a rare mineral from the rare family wolframite. It is considered to be one of the principle ores of tungsten. It is usually identified by the dark color, one direction of perfect cleavage and high specific gravity all serving to distinguish it from other minerals. The first recorded identification of the wolframite family was back in 1948 but it was not added as a mineral until 1951.

== Composition ==
Since hübnerite comes from a family with only two end members it would be easier to explain the composition of the wolframite family since there is not enough data on hübnerite itself. The primary formula of the wolframite series is (Fe,Mn)WO_{4}. The predominance of either iron or manganese results in formation of one of two minerals, the compositional end-members FeWO_{4} (ferberite) and MnWO_{4} (hübnerite), respectively. Hübnerite is rarer than ferberite because of the difficulty of substituting manganese for iron. There are also other analogues, such as MgWO_{4}. These compounds are usually referred to as "wolframites" because they share the wolframite structure, but are not naturally occurring minerals, typically being produced for industrial applications, e.g., crystal scintillators.

== Structure ==
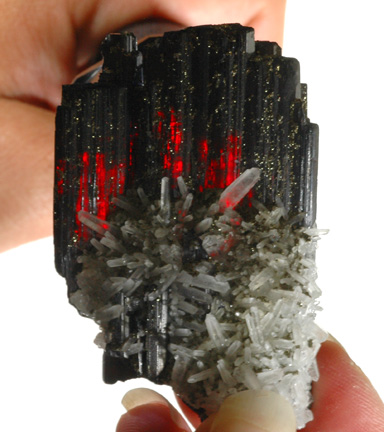
Sample from the Pasto Bueno District, Pallasca Province, Ancash Department, Peru, showing deep red internal reflections when backlit (Size: 6.6 x 4.2 x 1.6 cm)

Hübnerite is a rare end-member of the wolframite group, and has the same crystal structure as other members of the family. The crystal structure contains distorted tetrahedral (WO_{4}) and octahedral ((Fe, Mn)O_{6}) units. The wolframite family represents complete solid solution between Fe^{2+} and Mn^{2+}. In ferberite, the percentage of WO_{3} is around 76.3% whereas in hübnerite it is around 76.6%. In naturally occurring minerals the percent range falls within 20-80 percent. In the past it was thought that the wolframite structure possesses orthorhombic symmetry but in fact it possesses monoclinic symmetry. Short prismatic, flattened or wedge-shaped crystals are the common morphologies of wolframite crystals. In some rare cases the crystals occur doubly terminated. It is common for the faces to be striated parallel to the c axis. In most cases, wolframite is found embedded in quartz as subparallel crystalline masses.

== Physical properties ==
Color differences between members of the wolframite family are clear and marked. The color of hübnerite varies from yellowish brown to reddish brown. Crystal and crystalline masses of hübnerite show a variety of lusters from adamantine, submetallic to resinous luster. In thin splints, hübnerite can be either transparent or translucent. The streak is related to the color being a shade lighter. All the wolframite minerals exhibit perfect cleavage on {010}. On {100} and {102}, parting is less well-developed. Hübnerite exhibits brittle and uneven fracture. It is common for all members of the wolframite family to show simple contact twins on {100} or rarely interpenetrant twins on {001}. The hardness of hübnerite is between 4 and 4.5 and its specific gravity is between 7.12 and 7.18.

== Geological occurrence ==
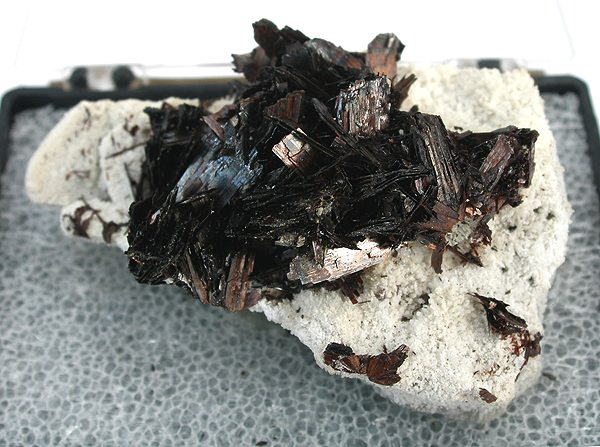
Hübnerite from the Adams Mine near Silverton, Colorado

Hübnerite is a rare member of the wolframite group. Hübnerite is usually found within pegmatites and high-temperature quartz veins. Hübnerite does not occur on its own, but is typically associated with other minerals such as cassiterite, scheelite, quartz, galena, arsenopyrite, native bismuth, pyrite, and sphalerite.

== History and uses ==
Hübnerite was not the original name given to the mineral. Hübnerite is a synonym of the original name, megabasite. The name megabasite was given to the mineral by A. Breithaupt in 1852. The name hübnerite was given to the mineral by E.N. Riotte in 1865 to honor the metallurgist Adolph Hübner.

Hübnerite is primarily used as a source of tungsten. Tungsten is used to harden metal in the manufacture of high-speed tools.

== See also ==
- List of minerals
- List of minerals named after people
- Manganese(II) tungstate
