= Wolframite =

Iron manganese tungstate mineral

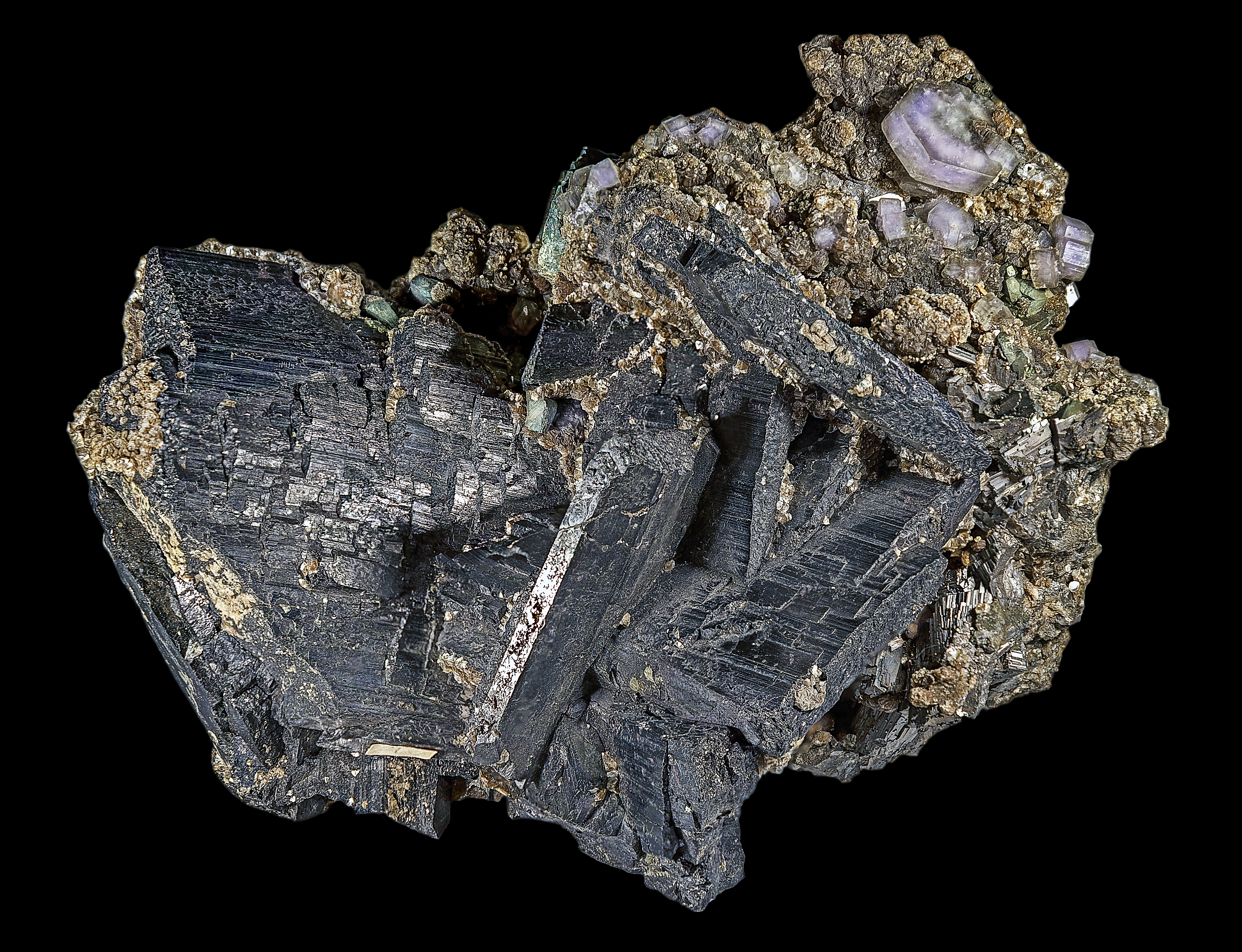

General
- Category: Oxide minerals
- Formula: (Fe,Mn)WO_{4}
- Crystal system: Monoclinic
- Crystal class: Prismatic (2/m) (same H-M symbol)
- Space group: P2/c
- Unit cell: a = 4.77 Å, b = 5.73 Å c = 4.98 Å; β = 90.2°; Z = 2

Identification
- Color: Grayish to brownish black
- Crystal habit: Tabular to short prismatic crystals
- Cleavage: Perfect {010}
- Fracture: Uneven to rough
- Mohs scale hardness: 4–4.5
- Luster: Submetallic to resinous
- Streak: Reddish brown
- Diaphaneity: Opaque
- Specific gravity: 7–7.5
- Fusibility: 3–4 to magnetic globule

Wolframite is an iron, manganese, and tungstate mineral with a chemical formula of (Fe,Mn)WO_{4} that is the intermediate mineral between ferberite (Fe^{2+} rich) and hübnerite (Mn^{2+} rich). Along with scheelite, the wolframite series are the most important tungsten ore minerals. Wolframite is found in quartz veins and pegmatites associated with granitic intrusives. Associated minerals include cassiterite, scheelite, bismuth, quartz, apatite, pyrite, galena, sphalerite, and arsenopyrite.

This mineral was historically found in Europe in Bohemia, Saxony, and in the UK in Devon and Cornwall. China reportedly has the world's largest supply of tungsten ore with about 60%. Other producers are Spain, Canada, Portugal, Russia, Australia, Thailand, South Korea, Rwanda, Bolivia, the United States, and the Democratic Republic of the Congo.

== Properties ==
Wolframite crystal from the Panasqueira mine, Portugal

The wolframite series is mainly formed through magmatic-hydrothermal processes associated with felsic magmas, namely skarns, or through metamorphic processes. In the more common granitic deposits, wolframite minerals can be found in both greisen and veins as its formation is tied to these two structures.

=== Crystal structure ===
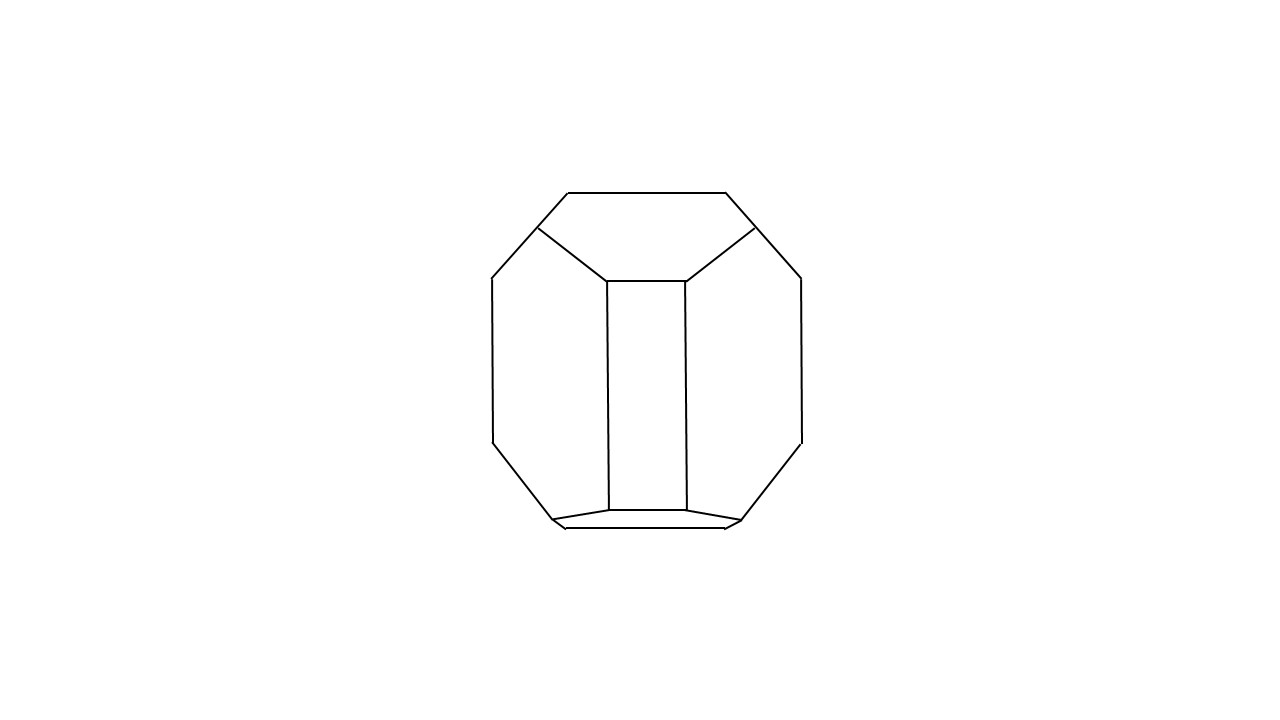
Diagram of wolframite crystal's front view

The wolframite series consists of two end members, ferberite (Fe^{2+} end member), hübnerite (Mn^{2+} end member), with Wolframite, (Fe,Mn)WO_{4} itself being a solid solution between the two end members. These two end members can be present in any proportion within wolframite, from 100% ferberite to 100% hübnerite. Wolframite contains the following percentages of its components, 60.63% W^{6+}, 9.21% Fe^{2+}, 9.06% Mn^{2+}, 21.10% O^{2–}. Wolframite ore exhibits massive form with a dark grey to reddish black coloration. Wolframite in its pure crystal form exhibits a monoclinic crystal system with a perfect cleavage of {010} and an iron black color. Wolframite in its crystalline form also displays lamellar and prismatic habits.

== Name ==
The name "wolframite" is derived from German "wolf rahm", the name given to tungsten by Johan Gottschalk Wallerius in 1747. This, in turn, derives from "Lupi spuma", the name Georg Agricola used for the element in 1546, which translates into English as "wolf's froth" or "wolf's cream". The etymology is not entirely certain but seems to be a reference to the large amounts of tin consumed by the mineral during its extraction, the phenomenon being likened to a wolf eating a sheep. Wolfram is the basis for the chemical symbol W for tungsten as a chemical element. The name tungsten itself is derived from the Swedish words "tung sten" ("lapis ponderosus" in Latin), meaning "heavy stone" because of its high density.

== World mine production and reserves ==
As of 2022, estimated world mine production was 84,000 metric tons of tungsten. The foremost producer of tungsten is China, with an estimated 71,000 metric tons produced; as such world tungsten supply is dominated by China and Chinese exports. The next highest producers are Vietnam, Russia, Bolivia, and Rwanda with an estimated 4,800, 2,300, 1,400, and 1,100 respectively.

As of 2022, the estimate world reserves of tungsten is 3,800,000 metric tons. Again China contains the greatest reserve at 1,800,000 metric tons of tungsten. The following countries have the next highest reserves: Russia, Vietnam, Spain, and Austria, with an estimated reserve of 400,000, 100,000, 56,000, and 10,000 respectively.

== Use ==
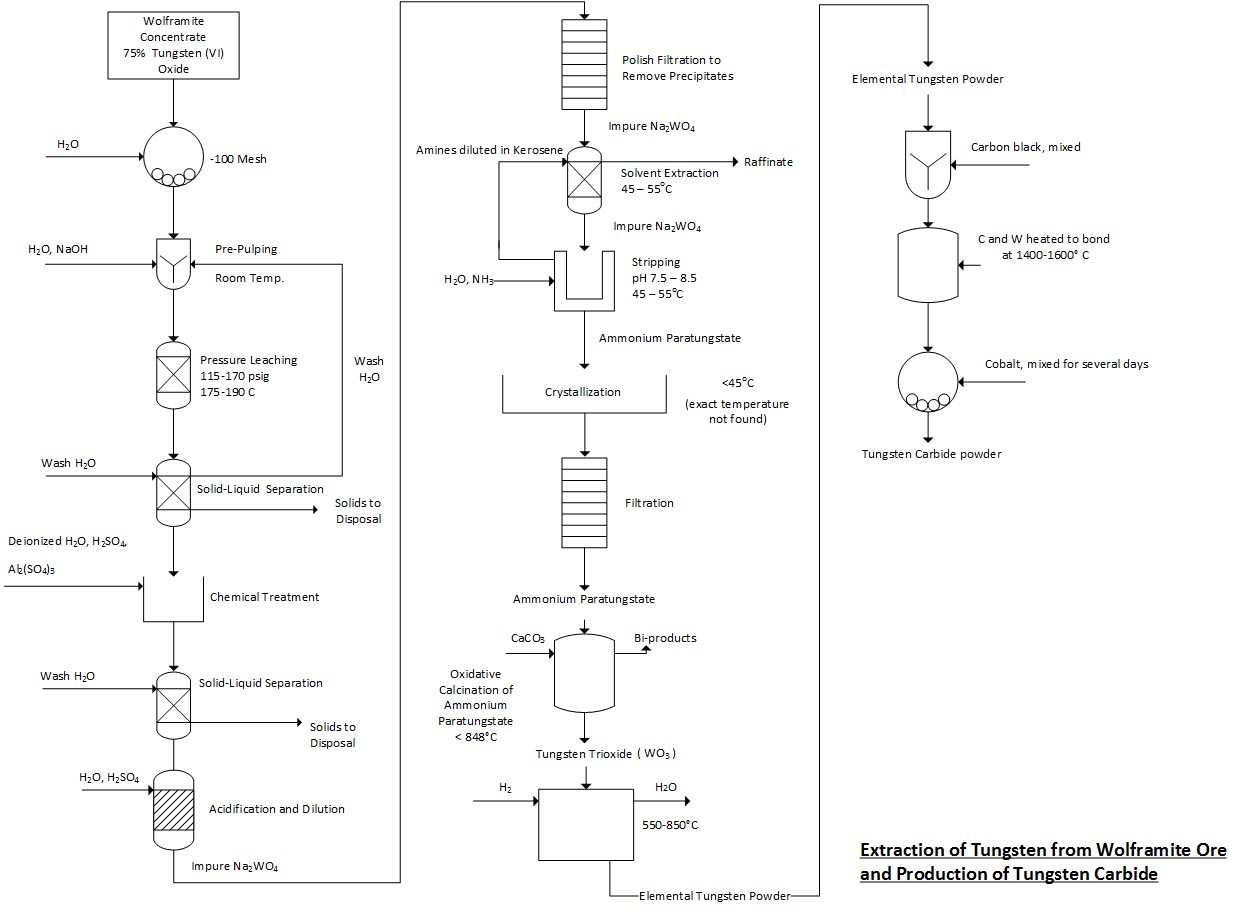
Extraction of tungsten from wolframite ore

Wolframite is highly valued as the main source of the metal tungsten, a strong and very dense material with a high melting temperature used for electric filaments and armor-piercing ammunition, as well as hard tungsten carbide machine tools. During World War II, wolframite mines were a strategic asset, due to their use in munitions and tools.

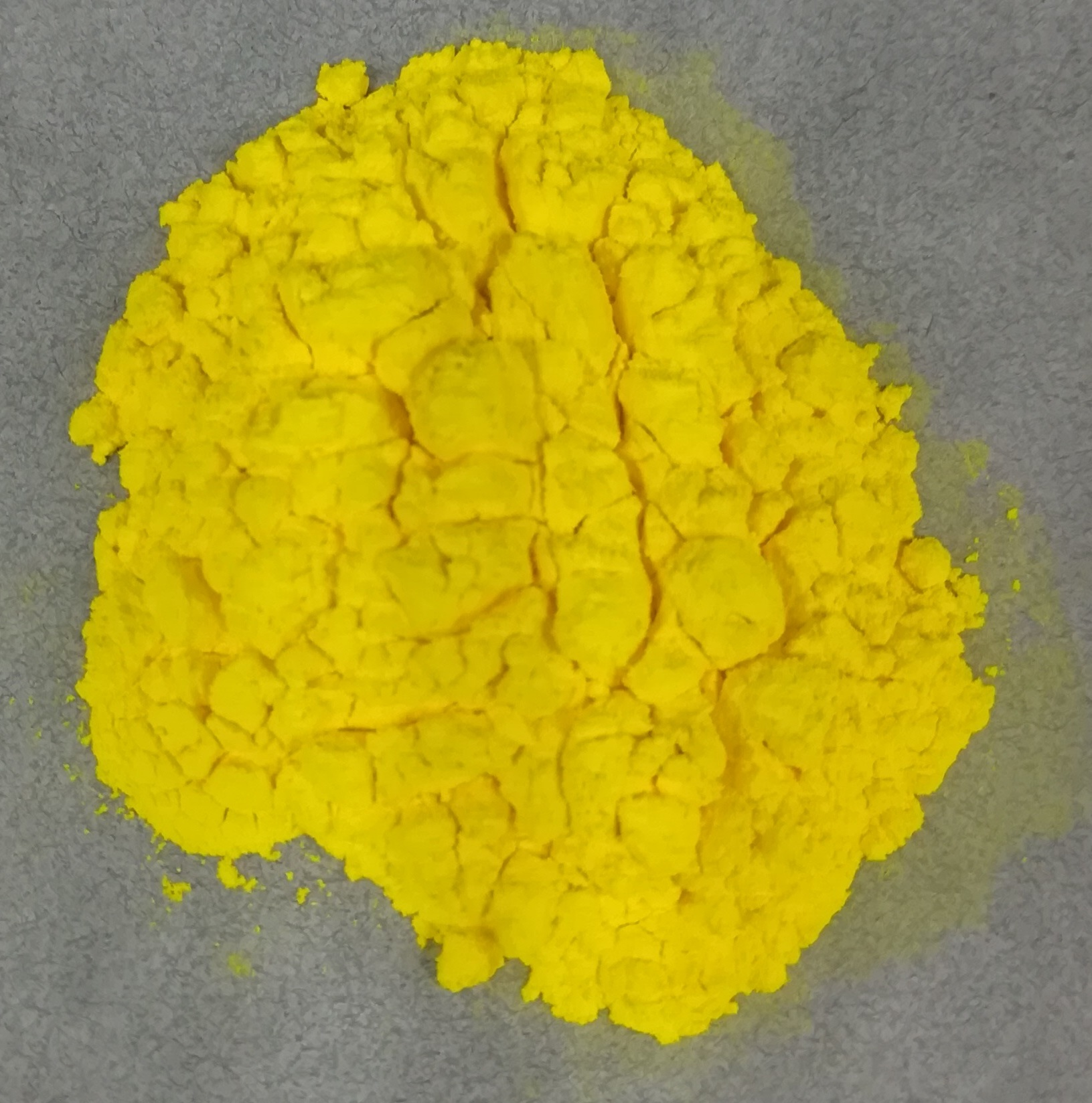
Tungstic acid (WO_{3}) in powder form

Tungsten salts were used in the 19th century to dye cotton and to make fire-retardant stage costumes. Additionally, in the 19th century, tungsten sulfides were sparingly used as lubrication for machining. Wolframite is also used to make tungstic acid, which is used in the textile industry.

A major modern-day use of tungsten is as a catalyst for various chemical reactions. One such catalytic use of tungsten is as a hydrocracking catalyst, which is used to improve the yield of organic components such as gasoline in hydrocarbon refinement, as well as reducing harmful pollution and byproducts. Another catalytic use of tungsten is as a De-NO_{X} catalyst, which is used in the treatment of nitrogen oxide emissions to convert harmful nitrogen oxides into inert N_{2} gas.

Another modern-day use of tungsten is as a lubricant, like molybdenum disulfide (MoS_{2}). Tungsten disulfide (WS_{2}) is a lubricant with a dynamic coefficient of friction of ~0.03. Tungsten disulfide can be used at temperatures of 583 °C and 1316 °C in air and vacuum, respectively. These characteristics allow this lubricant to operate in extreme conditions.

Wolframite was considered to be a conflict mineral due to the unethical mining practices observed in the Democratic Republic of the Congo during the Congo Wars.

== See also ==
- List of minerals
- Wolfram Crisis during WW II
