= Ferberite =

Mineral of iron and tungsten

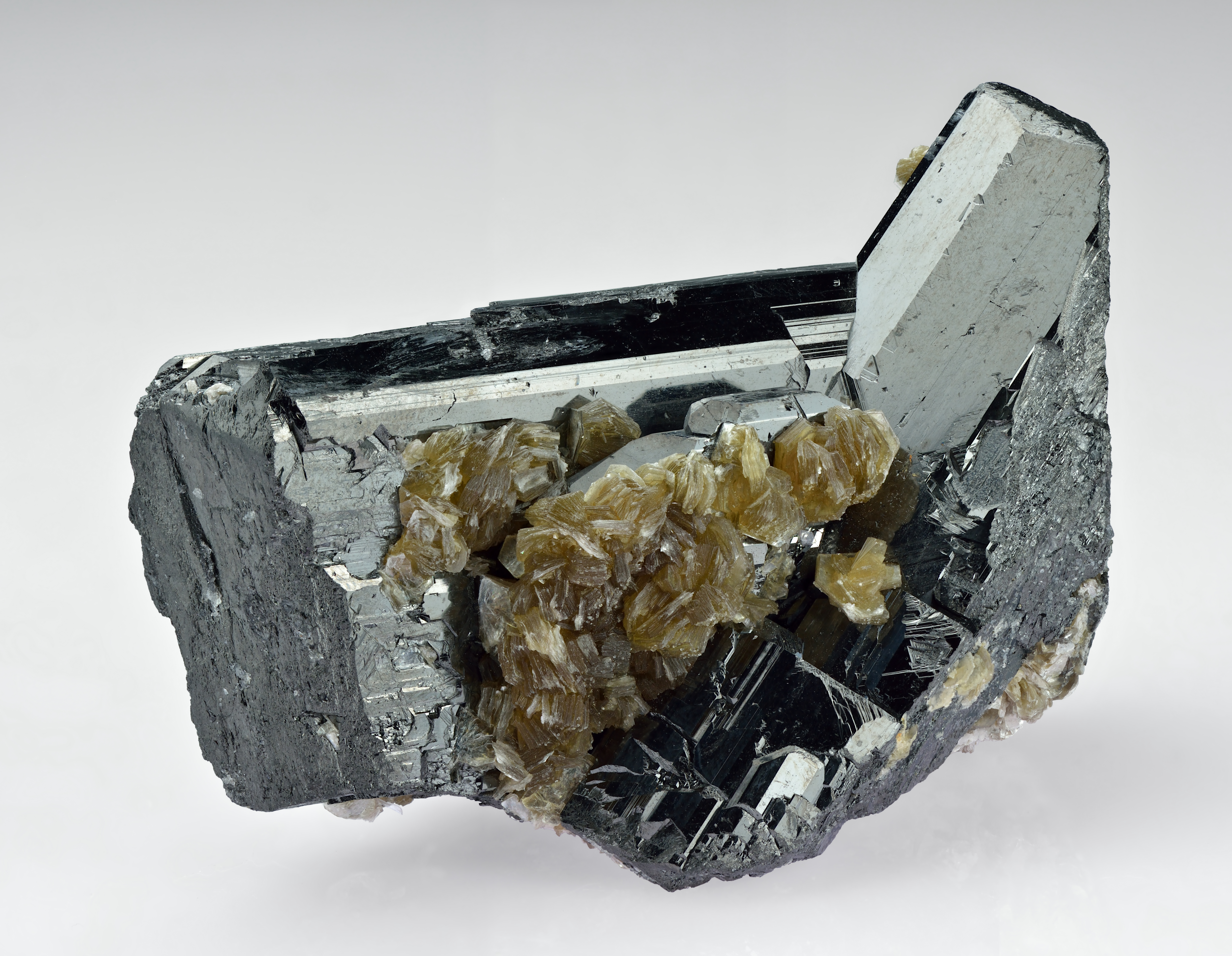
- Ferberite with muscovite from Minas da Panasqueira, Beira Baixa, Portugal

General
- Category: Tungstate mineral
- Formula: FeWO_{4}
- IMA symbol: Feb
- Strunz classification: 4.DB.30
- Crystal system: Monoclinic
- Crystal class: Prismatic (2/m) (same H-M symbol)
- Space group: P2/c
- Unit cell: a = 4.72, b = 5.7 c = 4.96 [Å]; β = 90°; Z = 2

Identification
- Color: Black, dark brown in transmitted light
- Crystal habit: Bladed crystals; massive
- Twinning: Contact or interpenetrant or lamellar twins
- Cleavage: Perfect on {010}; partings on {100} and {102}
- Fracture: Uneven
- Tenacity: Brittle
- Mohs scale hardness: 4–4.5
- Luster: Submetallic to metallic adamantine
- Streak: Brownish black
- Diaphaneity: Nearly to entirely opaque
- Specific gravity: 7.58
- Optical properties: Biaxial (+)
- Refractive index: n_{α} = 2.255 n_{β} = 2.305 n_{γ} = 2.414
- Birefringence: δ = 0.159
- 2V angle: Measured: 66°
- Other characteristics: Slightly magnetic

Ferberite is the iron endmember of the manganese–iron wolframite solid solution series. The manganese endmember is hübnerite. Ferberite is a black monoclinic mineral composed of iron(II) tungstate, FeWO_{4}.

Ferberite and hübnerite often contain both divalent cations of iron and manganese, with wolframite as the intermediate species for which the solid solution series is named.

Ferberite occurs as granular masses and as slender prismatic crystals. It has a Mohs hardness of 4.5 and a specific gravity of 7.4 to 7.5. Ferberite typically occurs in pegmatites, granitic greisens, and high temperature hydrothermal deposits. It is a minor ore of tungsten.

Ferberite was discovered in 1863 in Sierra Almagrera, Spain, and named after the German mineralogist Moritz Rudolph Ferber (1805–1875).

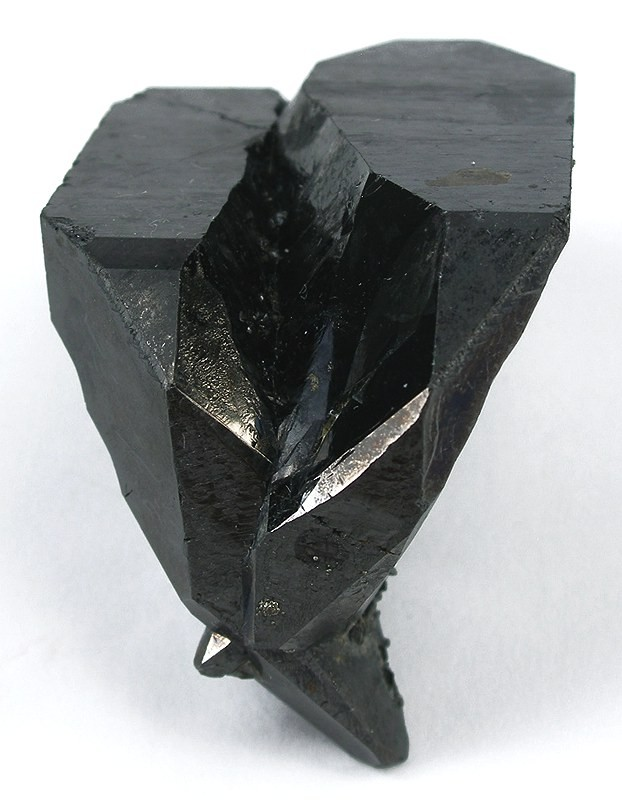
Twinned Ferberite, Tazna Mine, Atocha-Quechisla District, Nor Chichas Province, Potosí Department, Bolivia. 4.8 × 4.0 × 3.6 cm.

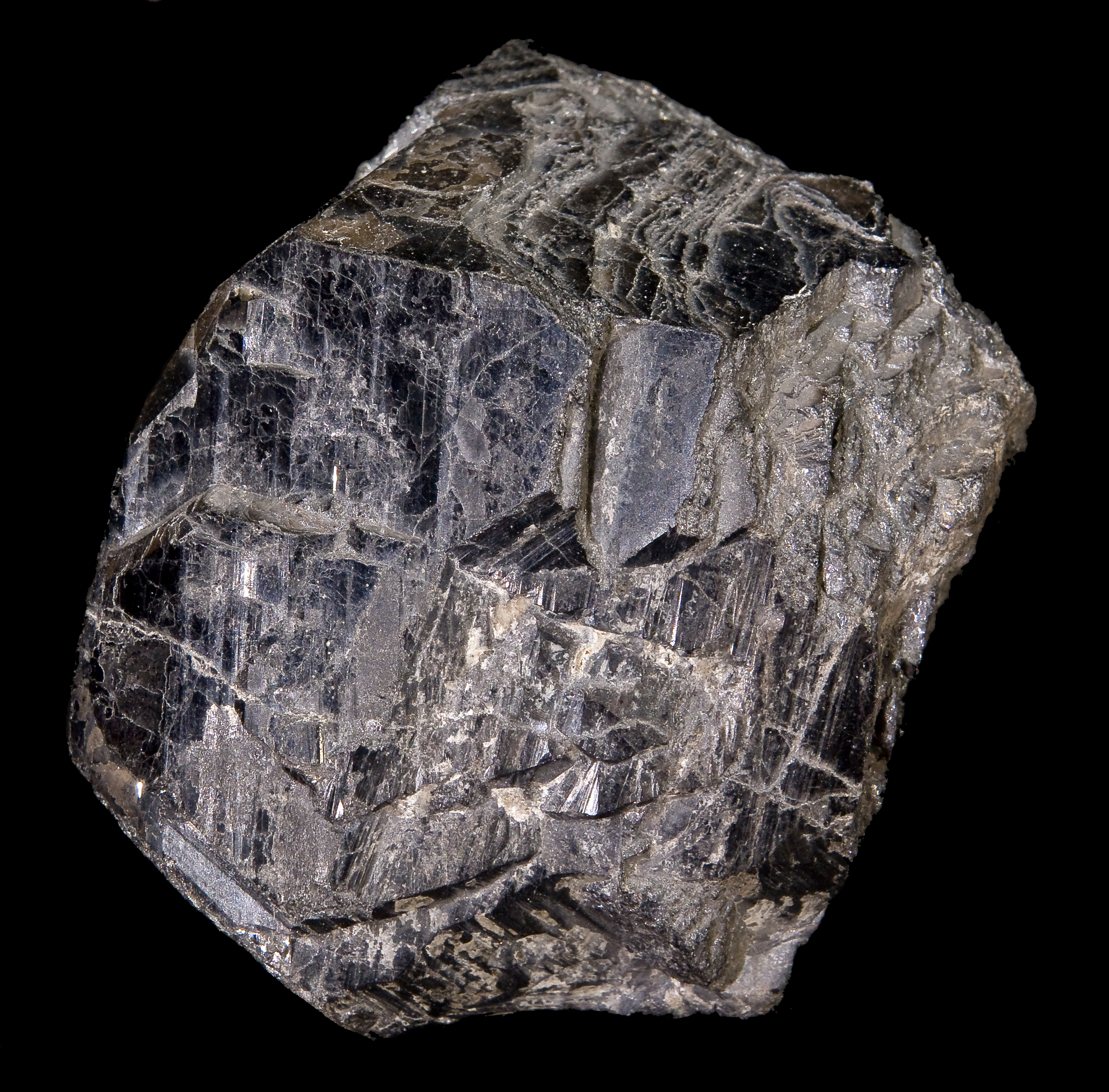
Ferberite – Cínovec / Zinnwald, Erzgebirge; Krusné Hory Mts, Saxony and Ústí Region (Bohemia), Germany and Czech Republic

== See also ==
- List of minerals
- List of minerals named after people
