= Colophonite =

Obsolete name for a variety of mineral

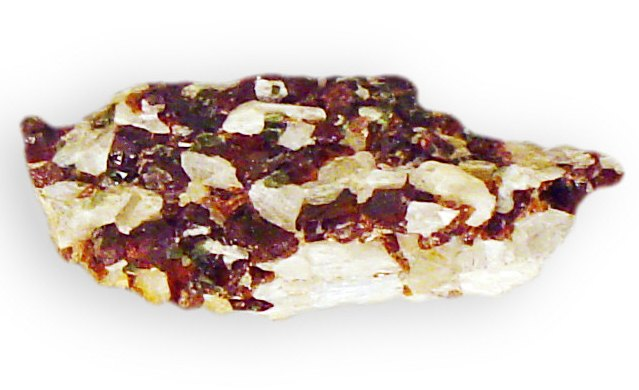
- Colophonite on wollastonite

General
- Category: Garnet, andradite
- Formula: Ca_{3}Fe^{3+}_{2}(SiO_{4})_{3}
- Crystal system: cubic

Identification
- Color: brown tones, from brown-yellow to dark red-brown
- Cleavage: imperfect, very imperfect (or absent)
- Fracture: uneven, conchoidal
- Tenacity: very brittle
- Mohs scale hardness: 6.5–7
- Luster: resinous or glassy, weak
- Streak: colorless or whitish
- Diaphaneity: opaque to translucent
- Density: 6.5–8 (calculated)

Colophonite, less commonly kalophonit (from Ancient Greek: κολοφωνία, kolophonia, rosin or rosin colors) — an obsolete historical name for a brownish calcium-iron mineral of the garnet family, a variety of grossular (later, andradite), discovered as an associated metamorphic mineral in the iron ore mines of the southern Norwegian islands, primarily Tromøya (near Arendal). It is a nesosilicate, with formula Ca_{3}Fe^{3+}_{2}(SiO_{4})_{3}. Other names for colophonite: resin garnet (French: Grenat résinite), calderite, rosin garnet.

Versions of the mineral composition and classification of colophonite differed at different times, although in the most general sense it was always classified as a member of the garnet group mined in Europe. At one time it was considered a brown ("rosin" in color) variety of grossular, then it was classified as a variety of andradite. Due to the low quality and transparency of the crystals, colophonite was very rarely used for jewelry or even ornamental purposes, although it was valued in mineralogical collections. By the middle of the 20th century, this name ceased to be used in mineralogy as relevant, and jewelers began to consider colophonite as a kind of historical synonym for hessonite.

== History and name ==
The name of this mineral means "rosin" (from Ancient Greek: κολοφωνία, kolophonia) and refers to the specific brown or yellowish-brown color of the stones. Occasionally it is transliterated as "kalophonit".

The most famous and oldest location of colophonite in Europe was the iron mines on the Norwegian island of Tromøya, located in the south of the country, near Arendal, where brown or red-brown opaque garnetites were found as accompanying granulates. Norwegian colophonites were of low quality and found almost no jewelry or trade use, but the name, published at the beginning of the 19th century and accepted by the scientific world, was temporarily assigned in European mineralogy to brown or red-brown varieties of ferruginous garnets.

Later, when mentioned in mineralogical texts, as well as in trade and jewelry practice, the two terms gradually began to become mutually confused: the lesser known colophonite and the more common hessonite, since one word referred to scientific practice, and the other was a commercial name, although both of them referred to grana brownish tones. In the end, the confusion of concepts led to the fact that colophonite gradually became outdated and became relegated to the terminological history of European mineralogy, finally giving way to hessonite in trade and jewelry practice, and in some cases began to be considered its complete synonym.

In the early and mid-19th century, the term colophonite as a low-quality ferruginous variety of garnet was widely used in the scientific community and was not questioned. Part of it was used to describe the nature of rocks and individual mineral deposits.

Descending along the new road, within a hundred yards of the public bungalow we see, to the left, and close to road, two large masses of a black looking rock overlaying some strata of a white one. This is the locality, where the common garnets assume the granular form, and resemble colophonite. <...>
The strata overlaying this lowest rock are those which contain the colophonite, being formed of greenish hard hornblende, and numerous granular garnets. This lower stratum of colophonite rock is extremely hard and heavy, having not much hornblende and the garnets not being so granular as in the upper one, but rather foliated.

== Properties ==
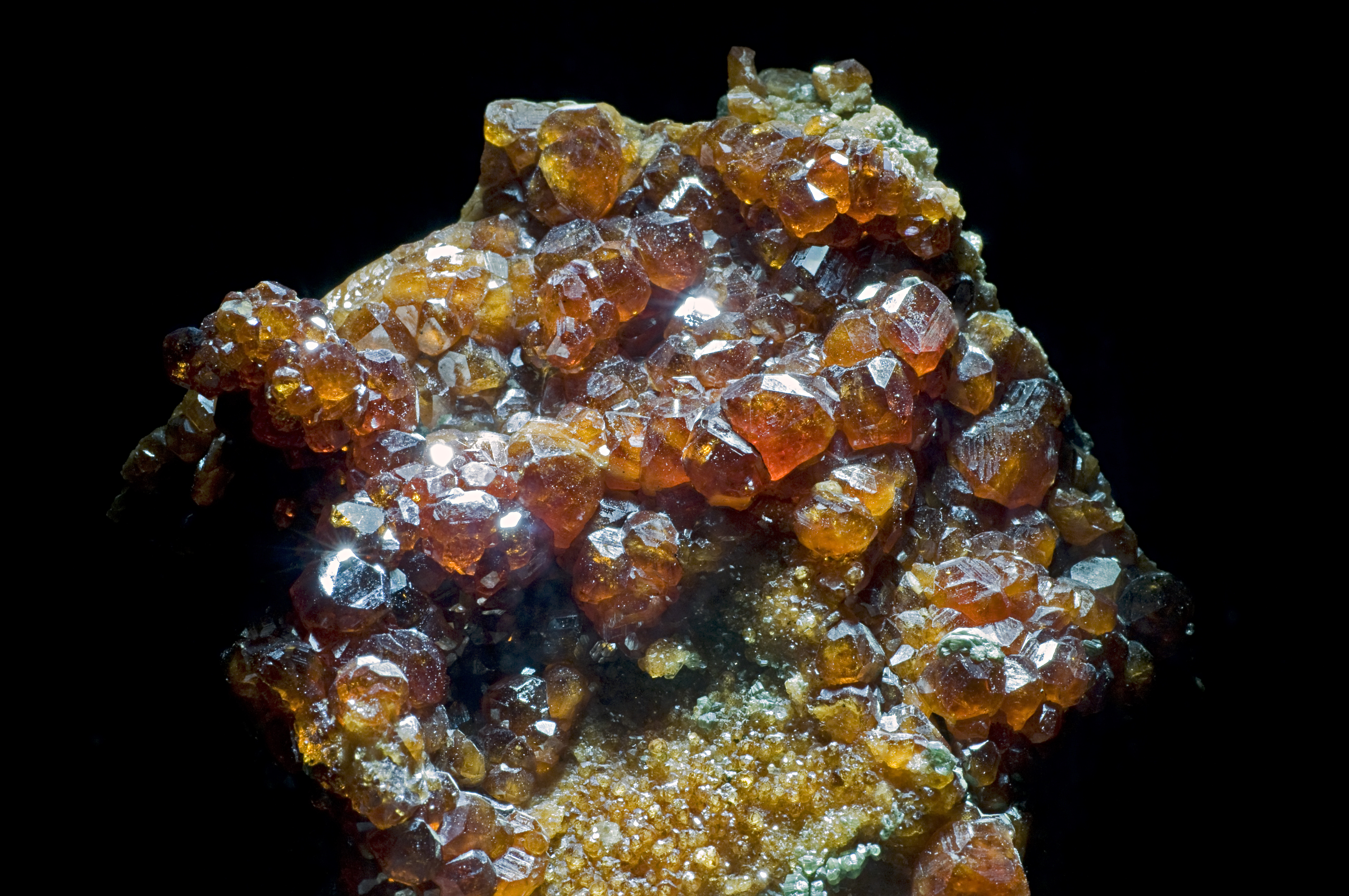
Grossulars similar to colophonites

Colophonite is a coarse-grained variety of brown, yellow-brown, or reddish-brown ferruginous garnet, most commonly andradite. The first known chemical analysis, carried out by a certain Simon in 1807 on crystals described in the most general sense as the mineral "colophonite" from the "Scandinavian lands", was not distinguished by either the specificity of the place or the clear typology of the sample itself. Most likely, the crystals were a light brown granular mineral obtained in some indirect way from the iron mines of Arendal.

Based on Simon's research, René Haüy in 1809 identified the Norwegian colophonites as ″similar″ to garnet (grossular), but then published an analysis of its composition in another section of the book devoted to vesuvianite, probably suggesting, for his part, that the mineral was originally studied and is not completely defined.

Colophonite is a typical island silicate, which can be classified as an intermediate in the continuous isomorphic series andradite — grossular. In terms of chemical composition, colophonite is a low-quality variety of mixed hessonite; it is a complex silicate of calcium and ferric iron Fe^{3+}, rich in many impurities and inclusions, with the addition of divalent manganese. Together with foreign additives, this mixture gives the mineral an indistinct red-brown color, cloudy to the point of complete opacity. However, Vasily Severgin in his encyclopedic reference book of 1821 characterizes the shade of colophonite somewhat differently, designating it as "red, very orange in color with yellowness". Depending on the amount and composition of impurities and mechanical inclusions, there are varieties with a resinous, glassy or greasy lustre. In addition, the spectroscopic method revealed the content of В_{2}О_{3} (up to 1.26%) in Norwegian colophonites.

In the descriptions of the early 19th century, the properties of colophonite differ significantly from those that were established later, based on the results of laboratory studies. For example, in «Seybert's Analysis of various Minerals» of 1822 it literally says the following:

Colophonite.
Occurs frequently disseminated and imbedded with green Pyroxene in Tabular spar, sometimes it forms considerable veins in that mineral. Colour in mass, deep reddish brown, in the state of powder it has a yellowish tinge. Irised on the uoter surface. Lustre resinous. Granular, the singe grains are highly translucent. Fracture of the mass irregular, the grains have a cleveage. Scratches glass and scintillates with steel. Easily frangible. Not magnetic. Specific gravity, 3.896. Fusible before the blowpipe inti an opaque black bead.

Like other representatives of isomorphic andradite — grossular series of garnetoids, colophonite forms crystals of rhombic dodecahedral and tetragontrioctahedral shapes. Cleavage is absent or very imperfect (very brittle crystals), the fracture is uneven or conchoidal, the symmetry is hexaoctahedral, the crystal system is cubic. In addition to associated rocks (vesuvianite or wollastonite), most mineral samples contain large amounts of impurities and small foreign inclusions, including zircon, diopside and apatite. Hardness on the Mohs scale ranges from 6.5-7.5; lighting 6.5-8 g/cm^{3}.

== Mineral formation ==
As a variety of andradite, colophonite is a typical product of calcite metamorphism. It is formed as a result of contact-metasomatic and metamorphic processes, it can be found in skarns in association with vesuvianite, wollastonite, magnetite, epidote, chlorites, dolomite, diopside, calcite, etc. The historical and most famous place where colophonites were discovered is located in the iron mines of the island of Tromøya in southern Norway, near Arendal. Colophonite has also been found on other Norwegian, Swedish and Finnish islands located south of Scandinavia.

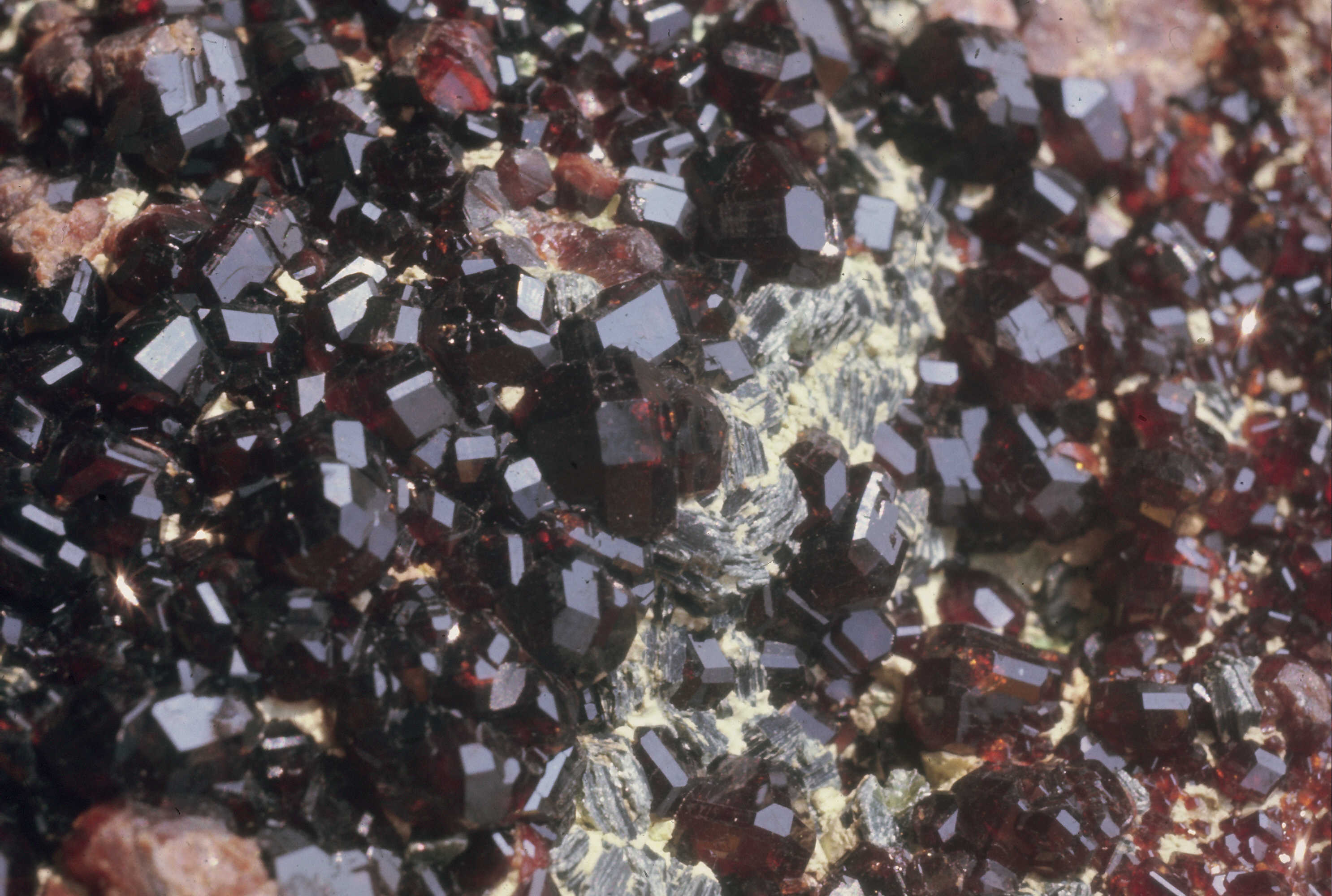
Hessonites (Liguria)

The Arendal ore deposits contain parent rock (apatite-collophonite) up to 20 meters thick; these are loose granular masses of yellow, brown, gray or almost black color, with a greasy lustre. The rock masses consist mainly of vesuvianite, in which metamorphic intergrowths of calc-ferruginous colophonite garnets occur.

Shortly after the publication of Simon-Gaüy, in 1817-1818, a new mineral was discovered on the island of Pargas (near the city of Turku) in southern Finland, described by the young Finnish-Swedish mineralogist, chemist and mining engineer Nils Nordenskiöld as a new, previously unknown variety of colophonite (hessonite). Like colophonite, not distinguished by high quality or large crystals, the mineral was also opaque, translucent only at the edges or in thin chips, the color was mixed and inexpressive: brown, brownish-reddish to brownish-pink. Named in honor of the State Chancellor of Russia N. P. Rumyantsev and without receiving any noticeable use, rumyantsovite existed as a separate regional form of colophonite for about a hundred years, until it turned into a pure artifact, an event in the history of the St. Petersburg Academy of Sciences and European mineralogy.

Colophonite, a variety of which was declared a mineral from the Finnish island of Pargas, shared approximately the same fate.

Since the second third of the 20th century, modern mineralogical reference books and dictionaries no longer consider colophonite as an independent variety of andradite or, especially, garnet, considering it nothing more than a form of hessonite (andradite) reflected in the literature of the 19th century or a scientific incident past, worthy of mention only in reviews on the history of mineralogy. Having become an "outdated synonym for hessonite", in most professional publications, colophonite is not mentioned at all, and indirect information about it and its properties should be sought in sections devoted to similar varieties of andradite.

== See also ==
- Andradite
- Demantoid
- Grossular
- Garnet
- Almandine
- Pyrope
- Spessartine
- Tsavorite
- Uvarovite
