= Lion of Merelani =

Tanzanian tsavorite gemstone

The Lion of Merelani is a tsavorite gemstone from Tanzania that is in the collection of the National Museum of Natural History of the Smithsonian Institution in Washington, DC. The gemstone weighs 116.76 carats, has 177 facets, and is an intense green color. It was donated in the memory of Campbell R. Bridges, the gemologist who discovered tsavorite, who was murdered in 2009. It is the largest known tsavorite gemstone and the largest fine gemstone ever to be cut and polished in the United States.

== Background ==
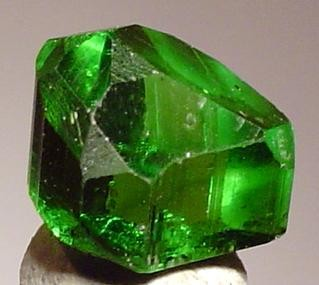
A 2.45 carat tsavorite crystal from the Merelani Hills of Tanzania. This example is less than 1% the size of the Lion of Merelani.

Campbell Bridges was a Scottish-born gemologist who spent most of his life in Africa. He discovered tsavorite in northeastern Tanzania in 1967. Tsavorite is a grossular variety of garnet, and its green color comes from trace amounts of vanadium. In 1970, he discovered deposits of tsavorite in Kenya, with transparent crystals large enough to be made into gemstones, and began selling the stones to Tiffany & Co. for jewelry within a few years. The stone is named after Tsavo West National Park in Kenya.

Bridges continued mining tsavorite and other gems in Kenya, working with his son Bruce Bridges, until he was murdered by a gang of illegal miners in 2009. Bruce Bridges continued his father's mining company, Bridges Tsavorite.

== Discovery ==
In 2017, a rough tsavorite crystal weighing 283.74 carats was found in the Merelani Hills mining district of Tanzania. It was displayed at a gem show in Hong Kong, where Bruce Bridges purchased it and decided to have it cut into a fine gemstone as a tribute to his father.

== Cutting ==
Bridges hired award-winning gem cutter Victor Tuzlukov to cut the stone at his company's facility in Tucson, Arizona. Born in Russia, Tuzlukov is now based in Bangkok.

Planning for the cutting began in February, 2018, and continued for six weeks. Tuzlukov used a 3D model of the rough stone to create a synthetic yttrium aluminium garnet duplicate for the purpose of practicing the cutting. He also practiced on a 31.57 carat tsavorite, working nine to eleven hours a day for five days on the smaller stone. The actual cutting of the larger tsavorite took about a month. The entire process was thoroughly documented from beginning to end. The finished stone is a square cushion cut with 177 facets, and the final weight is 116.76 carats. "The material is amazing," according to Tuzlukov, who said "It’s not only a pleasure but an honor for me to cut this".

== Donation to the Smithsonian ==
Bridges briefly exhibited the stone in 2019 at the American Gem Trade Association show in Tucson. He named it the "Lion of Merelani" after the district in Tanzania where it was found. He then donated it to the Smithsonian’s National Gem & Mineral Collection in 2022 in honor of his father. It went on display at the National Museum of Natural History in April, 2023. The donation was also credited to Somewhere in the Rainbow, a private gem collection.

== Descriptions ==
According to the Gemological Institute of America, it is "the largest gemstone of any kind, cut in the United States". The Washington Post called it "hypnotic, a miniature green hall of mirrors". Smithsonian mineralogist Jeffrey Post said "This tsavorite is truly one of the most important colored gemstones to have been mined this decade". WTOP-FM called it "one of the most finely detailed colored gemstones in the world". The Lion of Merelani is more than twice the weight of the Hope Diamond, which is also on display at the National Museum of Natural History.
