= Cyprine =

Cyprine may refer to:

- a variety of the mineral vesuvianite
- a valid mineral species (see cyprine (mineral), IMA2015-044) from the vesuvianite group
- the Icelandic cyprine, an ocean quahog
- a type of vaginal lubrication
- Cyprine, a character in Sailor Moon

See also: Cyprinid
