= Andradite =

Nesosilicate mineral species of garnet

Andradite [Adr]
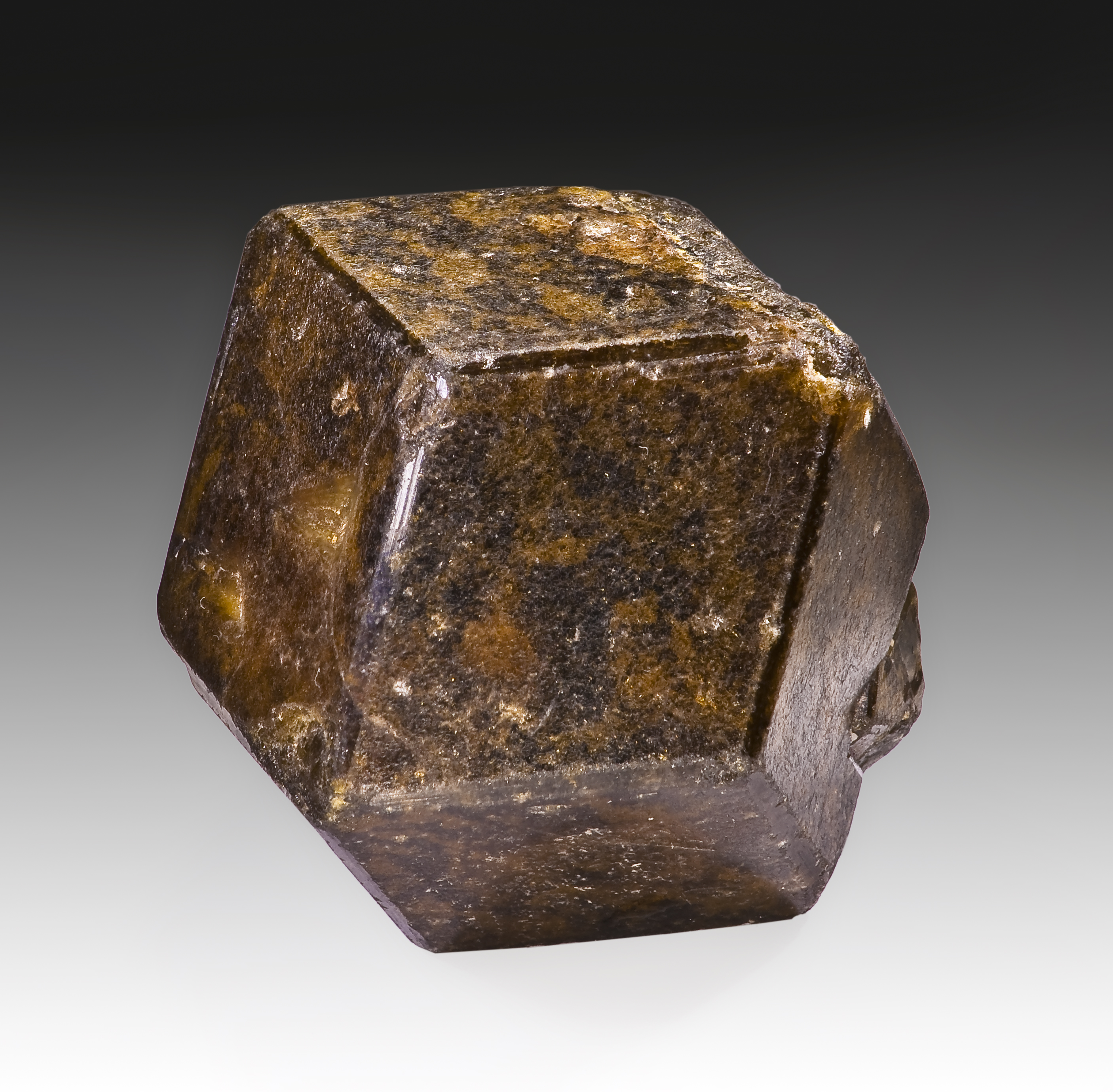
- Single crystal (4.2 cm) – Diakon, Nioro du Sahel Circle, Kayes Region, Mali

General
- Category: Garnet group
- Formula: Ca_{3}Fe_{2}(SiO_{4})_{3}
- IMA symbol: Adr
- Strunz classification: 9.AD.25
- Crystal system: Cubic
- Crystal class: Hexoctahedral (m3̅m); H-M symbol: (4/m 3̅ 2/m)
- Space group: Ia3̅d
- Unit cell: a = 12.056 Å; Z = 8

Identification
- Color: Yellow, greenish yellow to emerald-green, dark green; brown, brownish red, brownish yellow; grayish black, black; may be sectored
- Crystal habit: Commonly well-crystallized dodecahedra, trapezohedra, or combinations, also granular to massive
- Cleavage: none
- Fracture: conchoidal to uneven
- Tenacity: Brittle
- Mohs scale hardness: 6.5 to 7
- Luster: Adamantine to resinous, dull
- Streak: White
- Diaphaneity: Transparent to translucent
- Specific gravity: 3.859 calculated; 3.8–3.9 measured
- Optical properties: Isotropic, typically weakly anisotropic
- Refractive index: n = 1.887
- Absorption spectra: demantoid – 440 nm band or complete absorption at 440 nm and below, may also have lines at 618, 634, 685, 690 nm

Major varieties
- Demantoid: transparent light to dark green to yellow-green
- Melanite: opaque black
- Topazolite: transparent to translucent yellow, may show chatoyancy

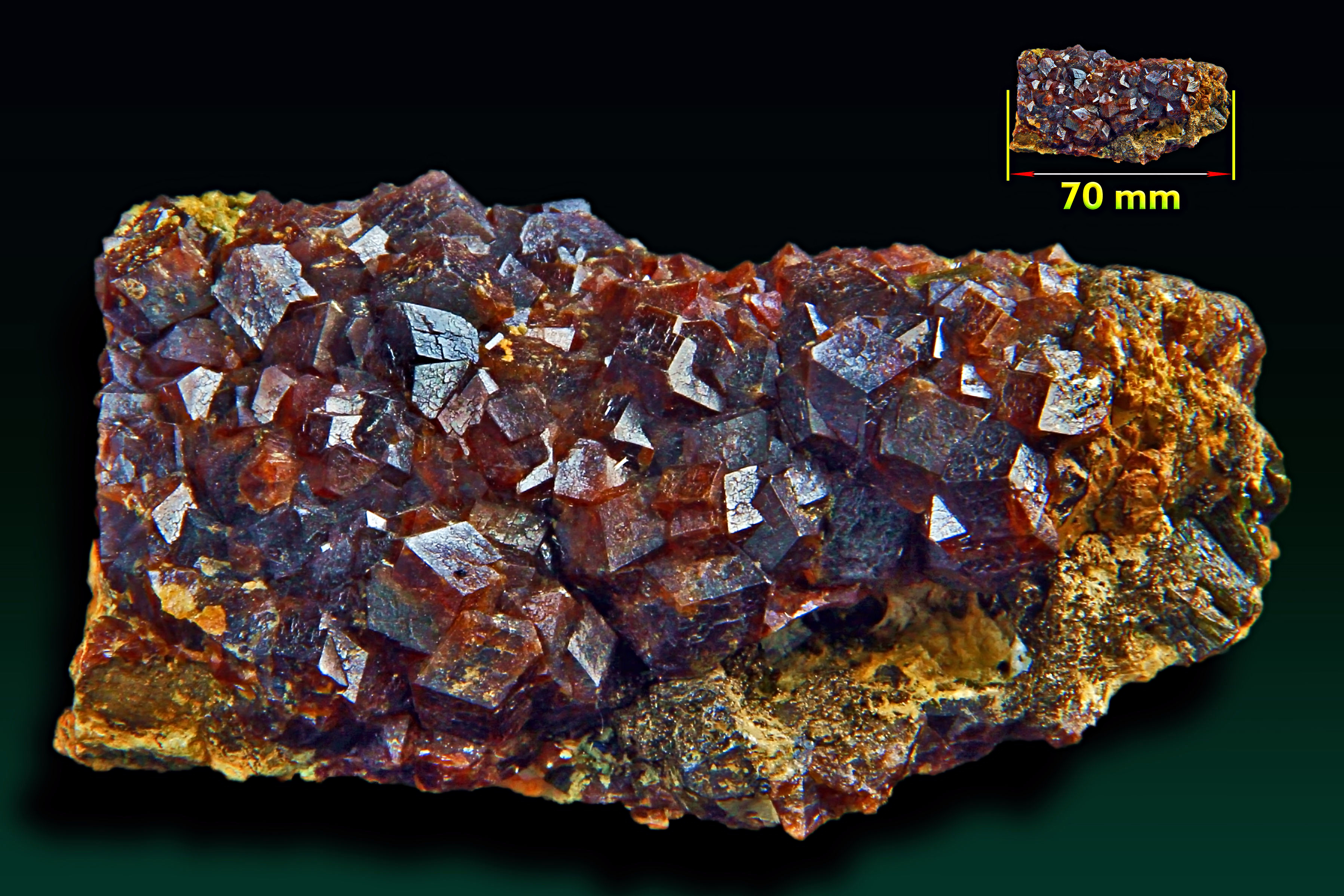
Andradite garnet – Jiangxi, Nantan, China.

Andradite is a mineral species of the garnet group. It is a nesosilicate, with chemical formula Ca_{3}Fe_{2}Si_{3}O_{12}.

Andradite includes four varieties:

- Colophonite: a historical variety found in the Scandinavian islands, brownish or reddish in color, often opaque or translucent.
- Demantoid: Vivid green in color, one of the most valuable and rare stones in the gemological world.
- Melanite: Black in color due to limited substitution of titanium for iron. Also known as "titanian andradite". Forms a solid solution with morimotoite and schorlomite depending on titanium and iron content.
- Topazolite: Yellow-green in color and sometimes of high enough quality to be cut into a faceted gemstone, it is rarer than demantoid.

It was first described in 1868 for an occurrence in Drammen, Buskerud, Norway. Andradite was named after the Brazilian statesman, naturalist, professor and poet José Bonifácio de Andrada e Silva (1763–1838).

== Occurrence ==
It occurs in skarns developed in contact metamorphosed impure limestones or calcic igneous rocks; in chlorite schists and serpentinites and in alkalic igneous rocks (typically titaniferous). Associated minerals include vesuvianite, chlorite, epidote, spinel, calcite, dolomite and magnetite. It is found in Iran, Italy, the Ural Mountains of Russia, Arizona and California and in Dnipropetrovsk Oblast in Ukraine.

Like the other garnets, andradite crystallizes in the cubic space group Ia3d, with unit-cell parameter of 12.051 Å at 100 K.

The spin structure of andradite contains two mutually canted equivalent antiferromagnetic sublattices below the Néel temperature (T_{N} = 11 K).

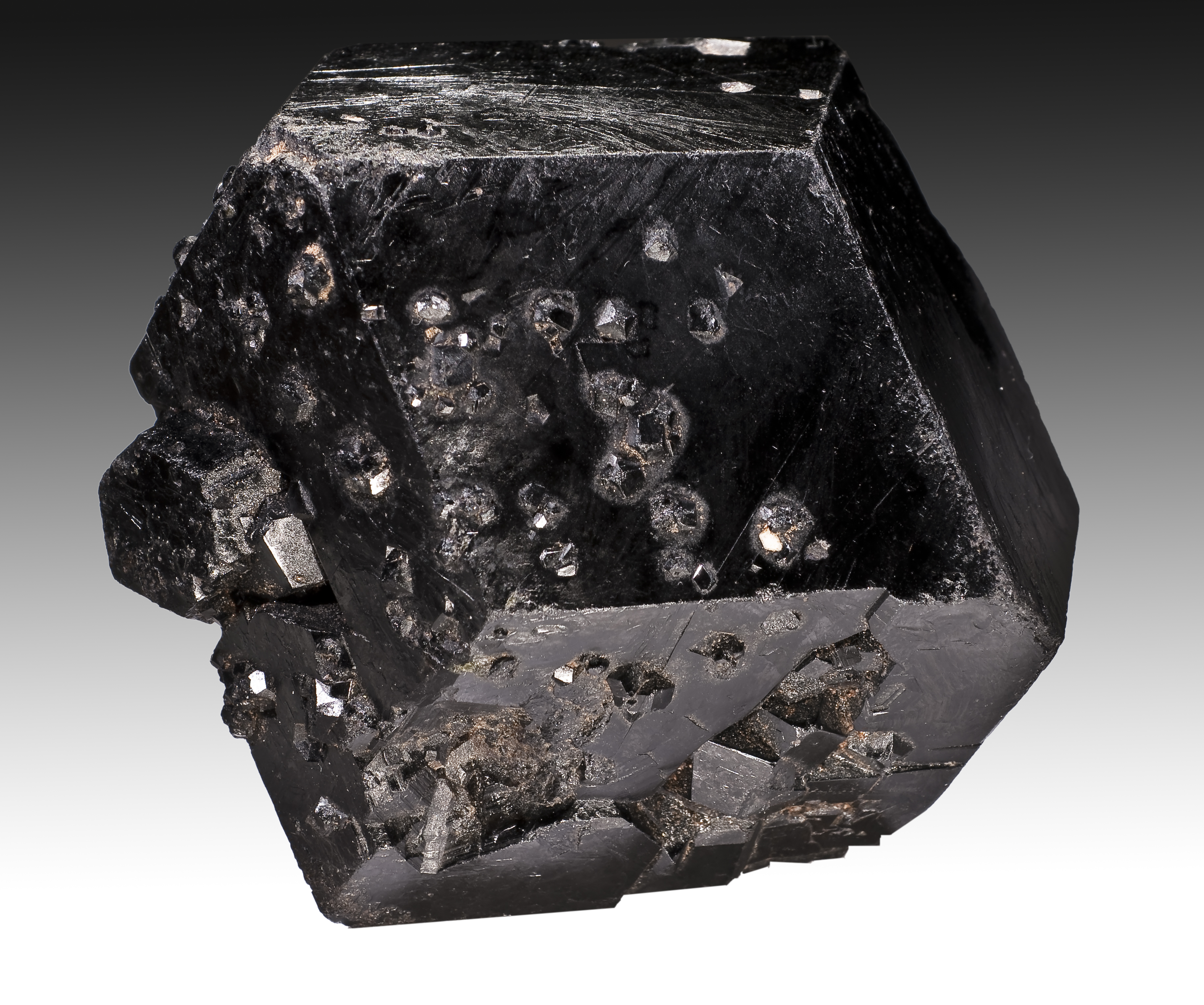
Black crystals of andradite: melanite

== See also ==
- Almandine
- Geology
- Grossular
- Mineral
- Mineral collecting
- Pyrope
- Spessartine
- Tsavorite
- Uvarovite
