= Severgin =

Severgin may refer to:

- Vasily Severgin (1765–1826), Russian chemist, mineralogist, and geologist
- Pik Severgin, volcano on Kharimkotan island
- Severgin Bay, on the Kuril Islands
