= African jade =

African jade is the colloquial name of

- Grossular
- Verdite, a variety of Serpentinite
