= José Bonifácio de Andrada e Silva =

Brazilian politician (1763–1838)

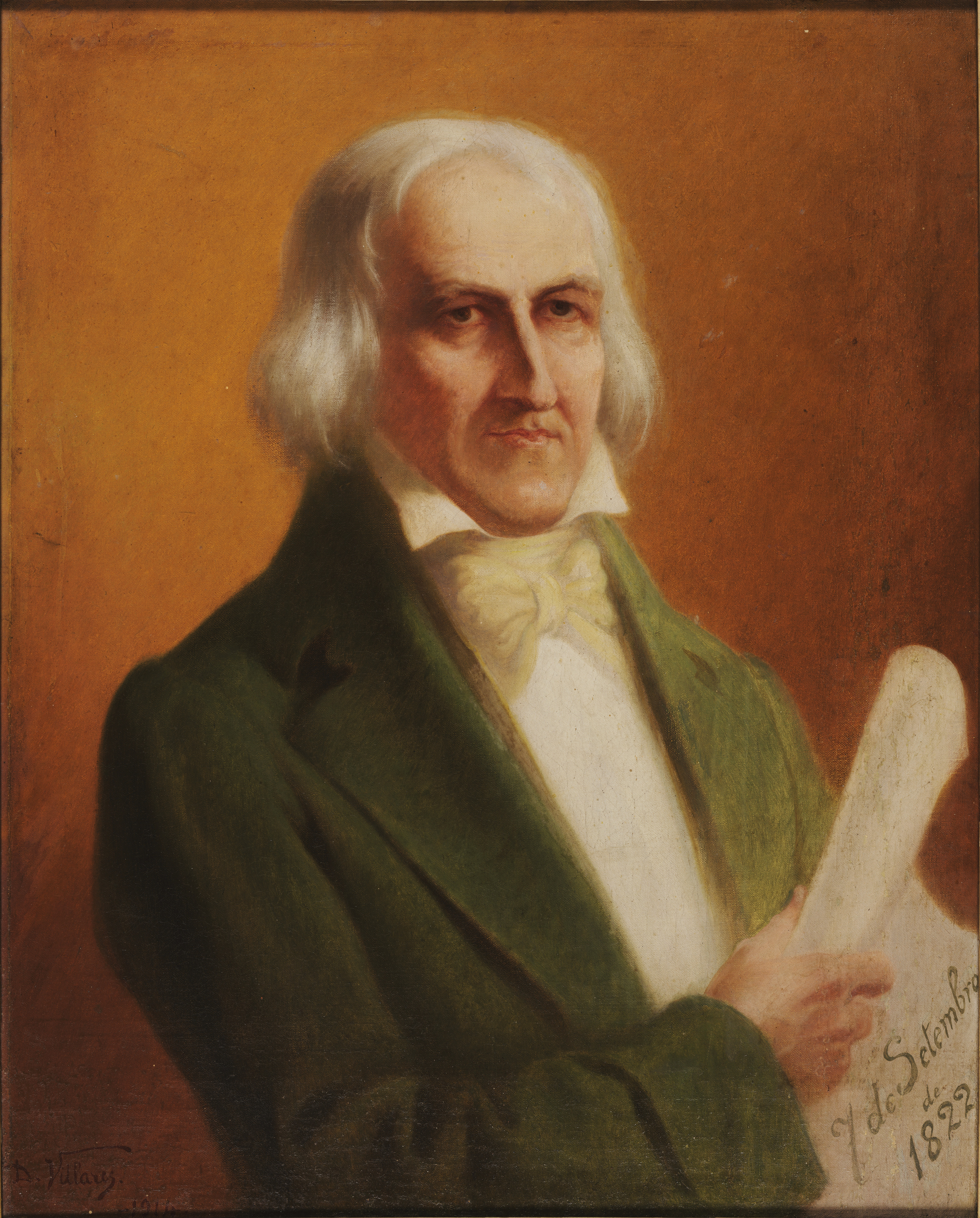
- Portrait by Décio Villares

Secretary of State of Imperial Affairs Kingdom Affairs (Jan–Sep 1822)
- In office 30 October 1822 – 17 July 1823
- Monarch: Pedro I
- Preceded by: Baron of Santo Amaro
- Succeeded by: José Joaquim Carneiro de Campos
- In office 16 January 1822 – 28 October 1822
- Monarchs: João VI; Pedro I
- Preceded by: Marcos de Noronha e Brito
- Succeeded by: Baron of Santo Amaro

Secretary of State of Foreign Affairs
- In office 16 January 1822 – 16 July 1823
- Monarchs: João VI; Pedro I
- Preceded by: Office established
- Succeeded by: José Joaquim Carneiro de Campos

Member of the Chamber of Deputies
- In office 22 June 1831 – 6 October 1833
- Constituency: Bahia
- In office 3 May 1823 – 12 November 1823
- Constituency: São Paulo

Personal details
- Born: 13 June 1763 Santos, Rio de Janeiro, State of Brazil, Portuguese America
- Died: 6 April 1838 (aged 74) Niterói, Rio de Janeiro, Empire of Brazil
- Spouse: Narcisa Emília O'Leary (m. 1790; died 1829)
- Children: 3
- Parents: Bonifácio José Ribeiro de Andrada (father); Maria Bárbara da Silva (mother)
- Education: University of Coimbra
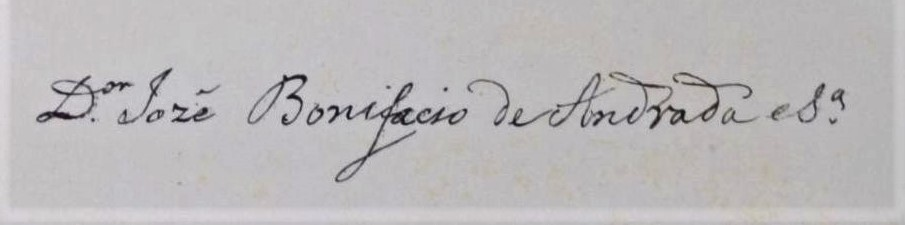
- Signature

José Bonifácio de Andrada e Silva (Brazilian Portuguese pronunciation: [ʒoˈzɛ boniˈfasju dʒi ɐ̃ˈdɾadɐ i ˈsiwvɐ]; 13 June 1763 – 6 April 1838) was a Brazilian statesman, naturalist, mineralist, professor and poet, born in Santos, São Paulo, then part of the Portuguese Empire.

He was one of the most important mentors of Brazilian independence, and his actions were decisive for the success of Emperor Pedro I. He supported public education, was an abolitionist and suggested that a new national capital be created in Brazil's underdeveloped interior (effected over a century later as Brasília). His career as a naturalist was marked by the discovery of four new minerals.

== Life ==
In 1800, Bonifácio was appointed professor of geology at Coimbra, and soon after inspector-general of the Portuguese mines; and in 1812, he was made perpetual secretary of the Lisbon Academy of Sciences. Returning to Brazil in 1819, he urged Prince Regent Pedro to resist the recall of the Lisbon court, and was appointed one of his ministers in 1821. When the independence of Brazil was declared, Bonifácio became minister of the interior and of foreign affairs; and when it was established, he was again elected by the Constituent Assembly. He was also the author of the abolition project in Brazil, presented to the Constituent Assembly in 1823. But his democratic principles resulted in his dismissal from office in July 1823.

=== Career in Europe ===
José Bonifácio spent part of his life in Europe. In his travels around Europe, he studied chemistry and mineralogy with other scientists. He collected data, carried out scientific experiments and discovered four new minerals and eight previously unknown species. The mineral andradite is named after him. Among his other discoveries was petalite, a lithium-containing material, first discovered by Bonifácio toward the end of the 18th century on a trip to Sweden; it was in this mineral that Swedish chemists first discovered lithium. He was also the first to discover another important lithium-containing mineral, spodumene, from the same source, the island of Utö in the Stockholm Archipelago of Sweden.

In 1797, he was elected a foreign member of the Royal Swedish Academy of Sciences.

Bonifácio graduated with degrees in Law and Natural Philosophy from the University of Coimbra. He joined the Lisbon Academy of Sciences. He taught Geognosy at the University of Coimbra in Portugal. Knowing twelve languages, he could speak four.

=== Return to Brazil ===
In the year 1819, he travelled back to Brazil, where he continued to conduct scientific research. A talented man having an unquiet temperament, he was also appointed Minister for Kingdom and Overseas Affairs and became the de facto prime minister.

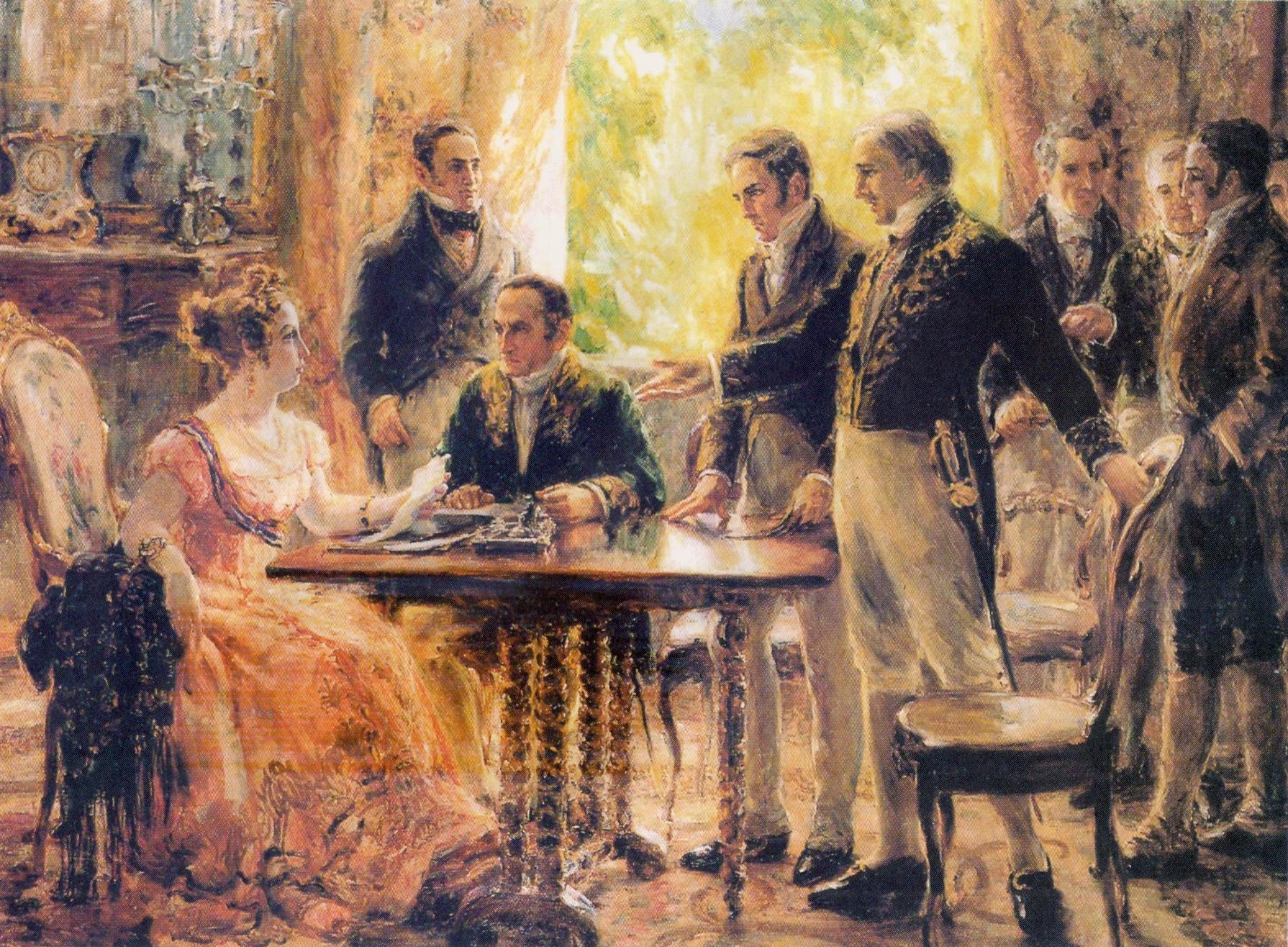
Andrada e Silva (gesturing) talking to Maria Lepoldina, Princess Royal Regent of the Kingdom of Brazil on behalf of her husband Prince Pedro during a meeting with the Council of Ministers, 2 September 1822.

His relationship with the prince Dom Pedro I became incompatible, and he decided to join the opposition. In 1823, he was exiled and went to live in Bordeaux where, in 1825, come out his "Poesias Avulsas" (Sundry Poetries). To publish them, he used the pseudonym Américo Elísio. On the dissolution of the Assembly in November (the Night of Agony), he was arrested and banished to France, where he lived in exile near Bordeaux until 1829, when he was permitted to return to Brazil.

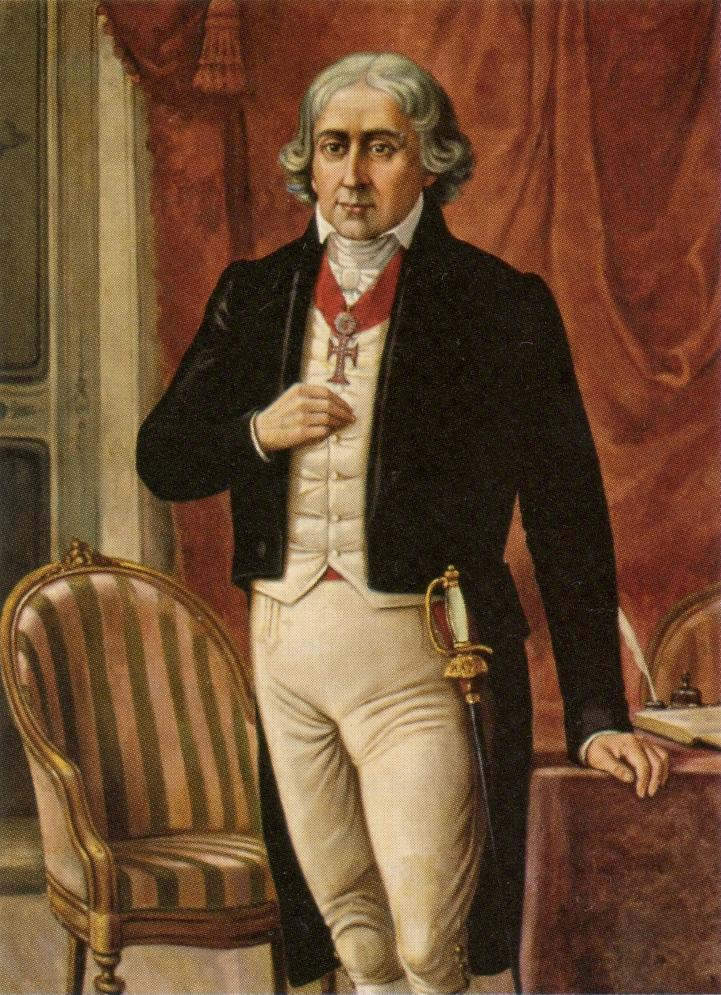
Portrait by Benedito Calixto

In 1831, when Dom Pedro I abdicated from the throne, he was appointed by the former Emperor to be the tutor of the Emperor's son, Dom Pedro II. Since he did not agree with the Regent's government, he tried to reestablish the Empire. After being again arrested in 1833 and tried for intriguing on behalf of Dom Pedro I, he passed the rest of his days in retirement at the city of Niterói. He lost his duties as tutor and was accused of being a traitor, but he was eventually pardoned.

In December 1836, he contracted tuberculosis. He died of the disease on 6 April 1838 in Niterói.

=== Career in literature ===
José Bonifácio had also been engaged in Literature. His work Poesias Avulsas that came out in Bordeaux was republished in Brazil, in 1861, by the publisher Laemmert. In Brazil, it received the title "Poesias" (Poetries) and the publication had the coordination of Joaquim Norberto de Sousa. In 1942 Afrânio Peixoto prepared another issue through the Brazilian Academy of Letters. This work, prefaced with a text by Sérgio Buarque de Holanda, was also published in a collection, as Volume I, idealised by the "Instituto Nacional do Livro" (The National Book Institute), appearing in 1946 with the title Poesias de Américo Elísio [Américo Elísio's Poetry]. His poetry shows a naturalistic pantheism that expresses his intellectual character and scientific curiosity.

His scientific, political and social works are published in Volume III, compiled and reproduced by Edgar Cerqueira Falcão with the title Obras científicas, politicas e sociais de José Bonifácio de Andrada e Silva. Its third edition came out in 1963 to celebrate the bicentennial of the Patriarch of the Independence.

The mineral andradite was named after José Bonifácio.

== Gallery ==
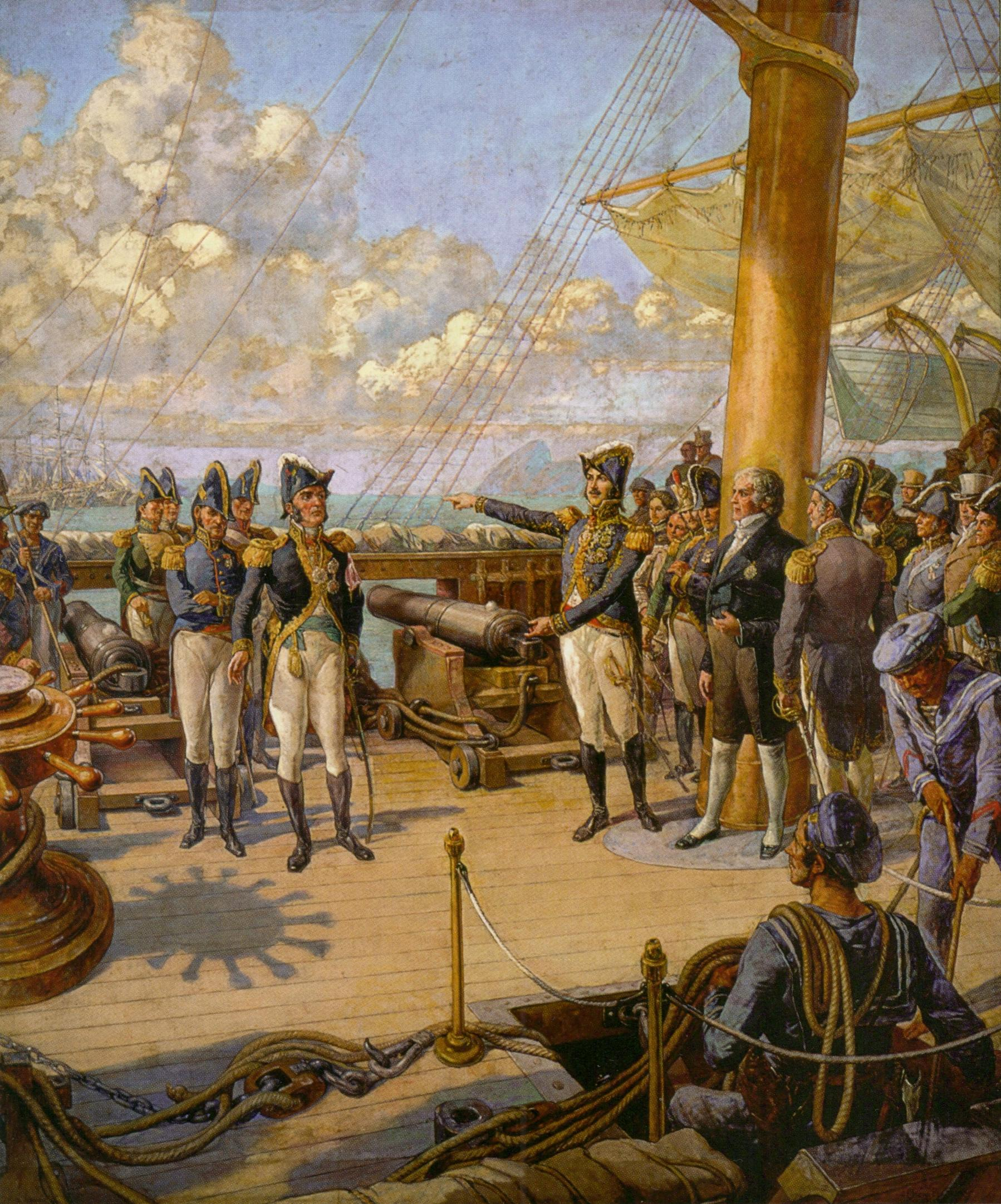
Prince Regent Pedro of Braganza (pointing) with Andrada e Silva (in civilian clothes) and others on the deck of the Brazilian frigate União, 8 February 1822

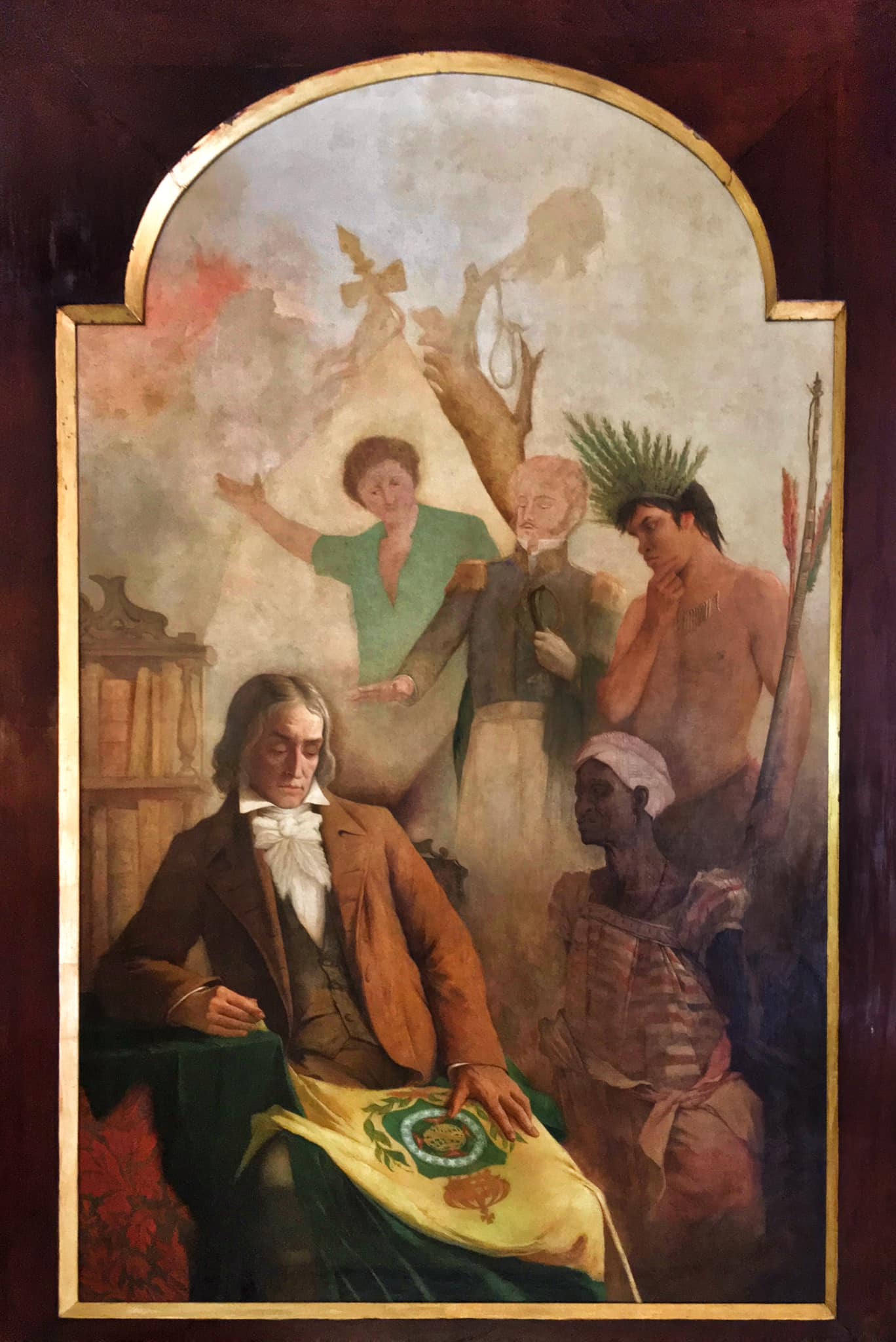
The Founding of the Brazilian Fatherland, an 1899 allegorical painting depicting Andrada e Silva with the imperial flag and three major ethnic groups in Brazil

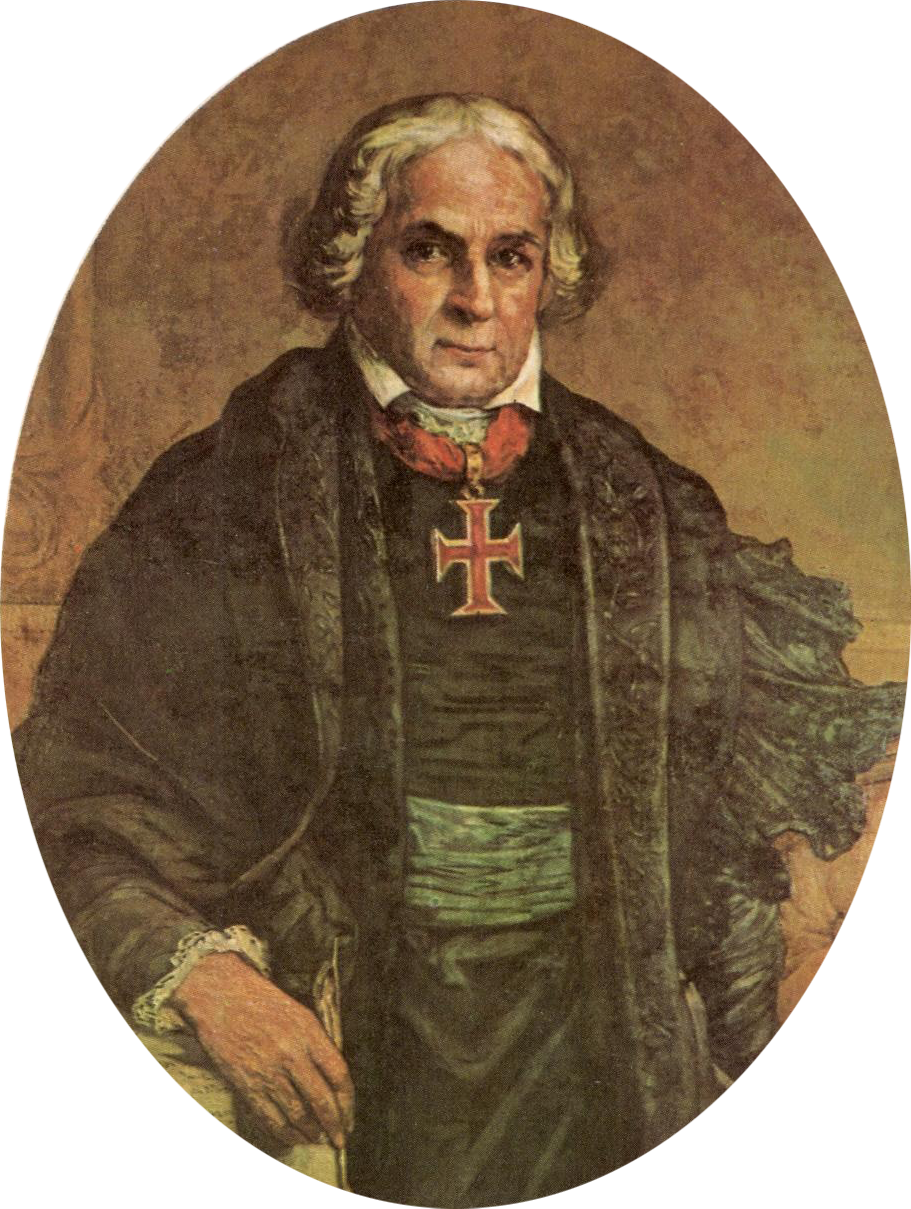
Portrait by Oscar Pereira da Silva

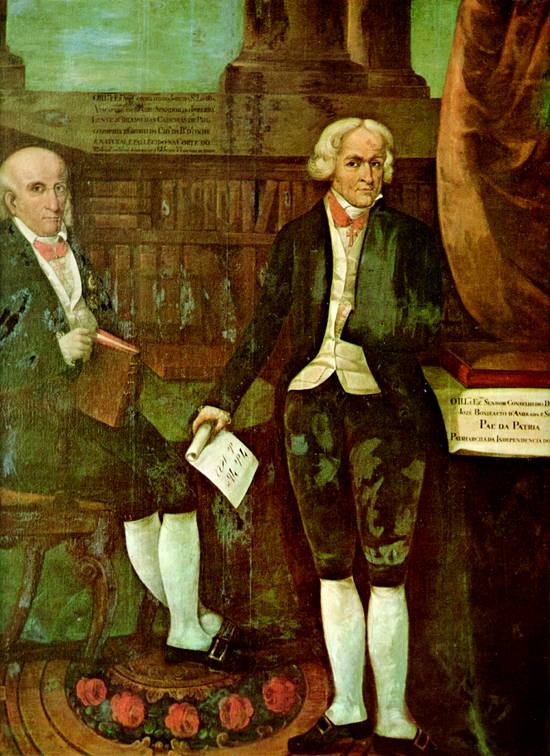
With the Viscount of Cairu (left)

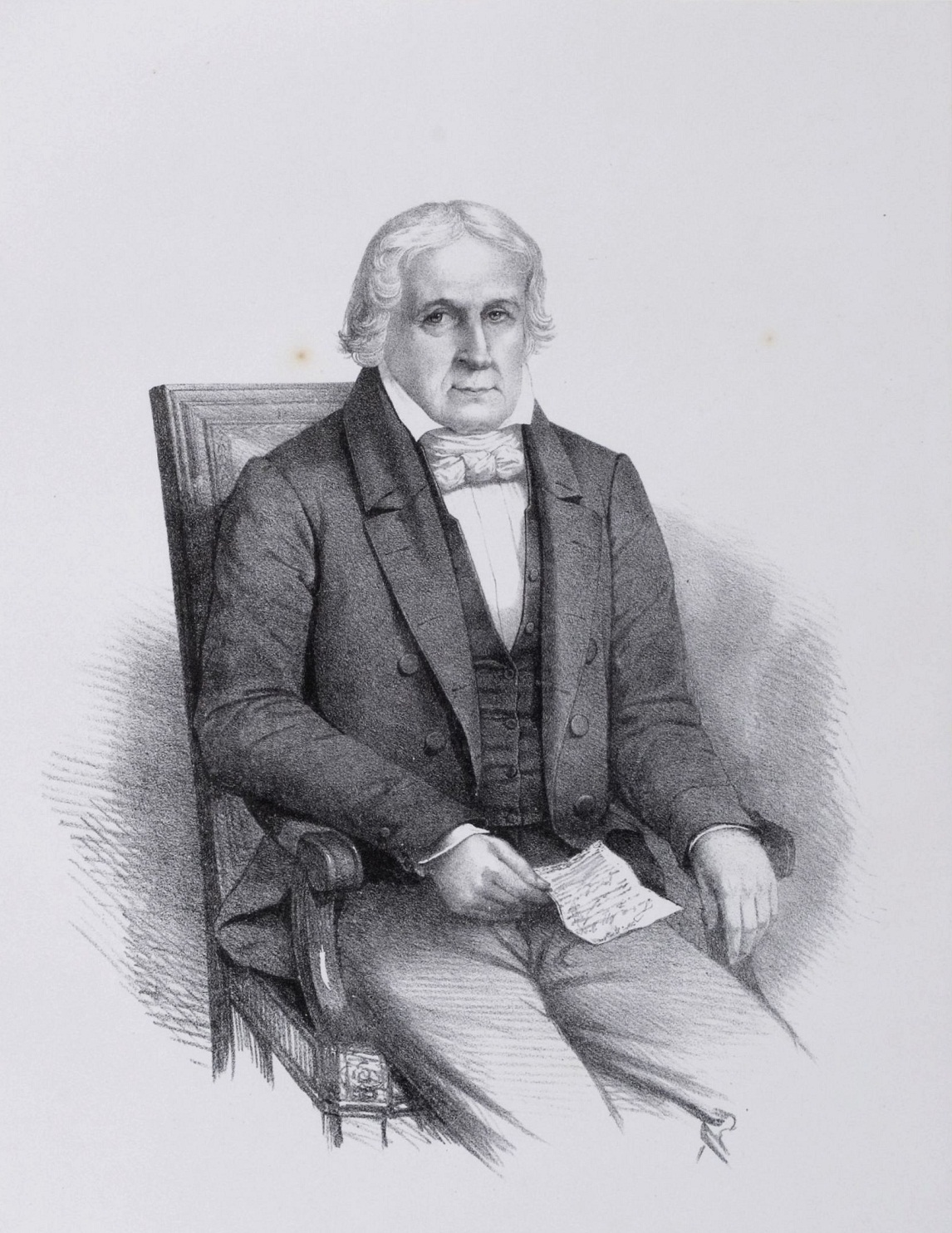
Drawing by S. A. Sisson, between 1858 and 1861

=== Monuments ===
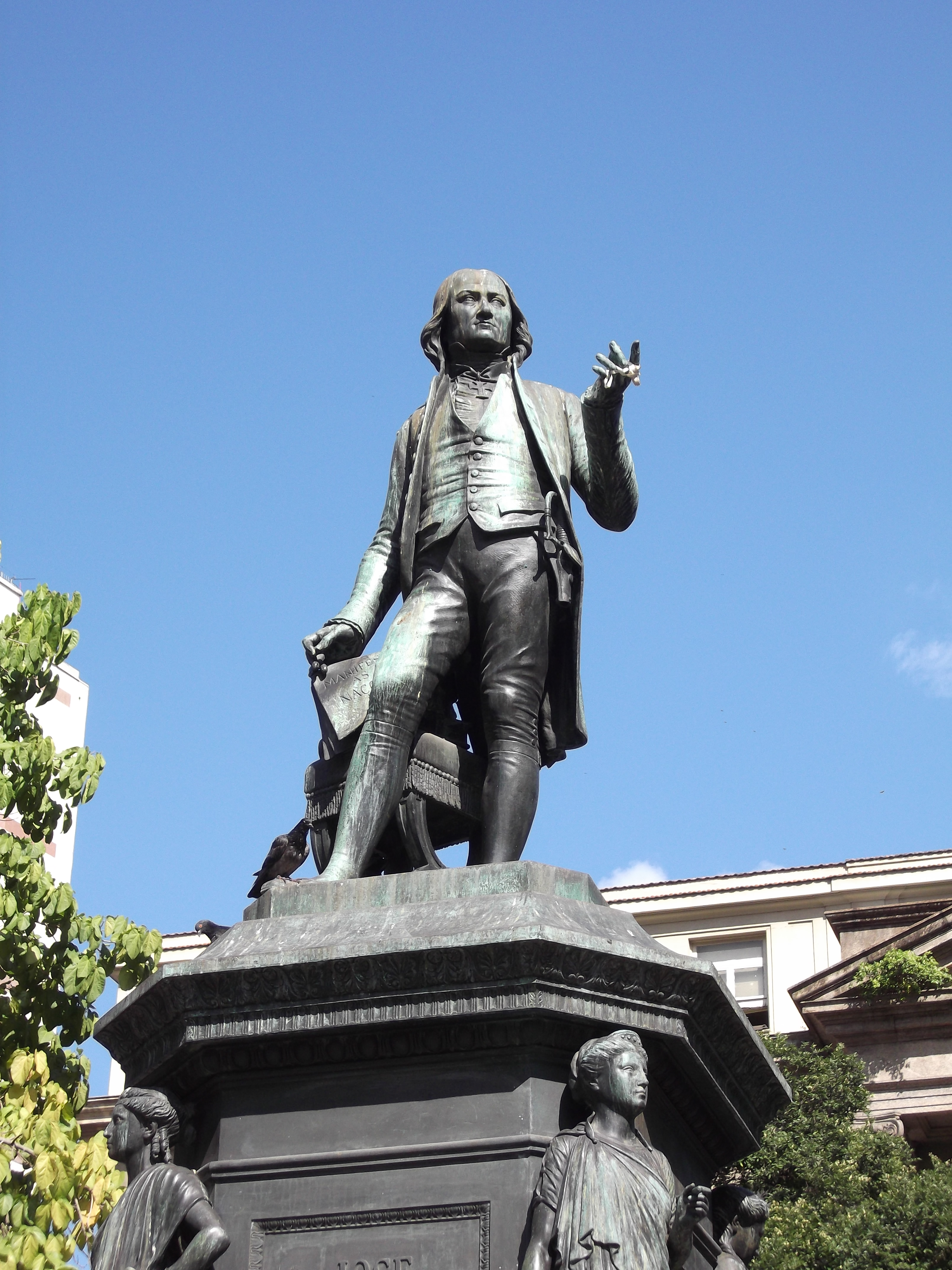
Statue in Rio de Janeiro

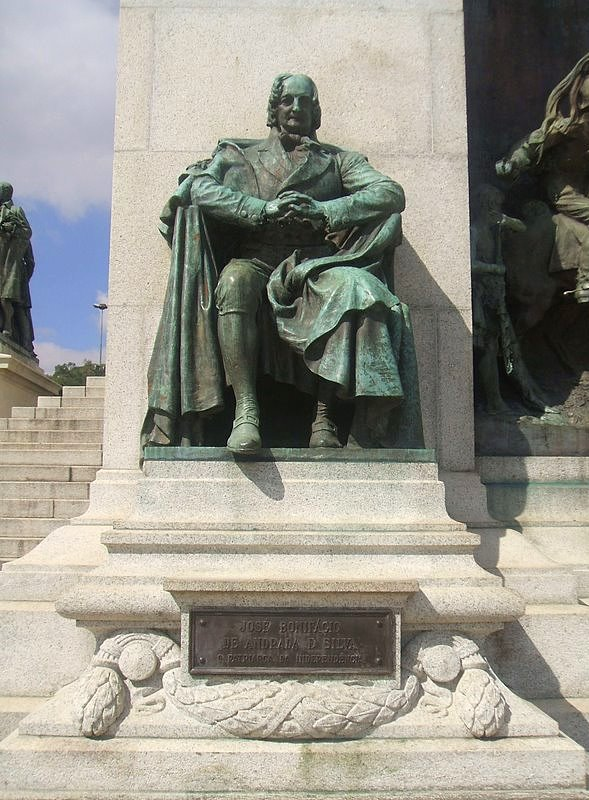
Statue at the Monument to the Independence of Brazil in São Paulo

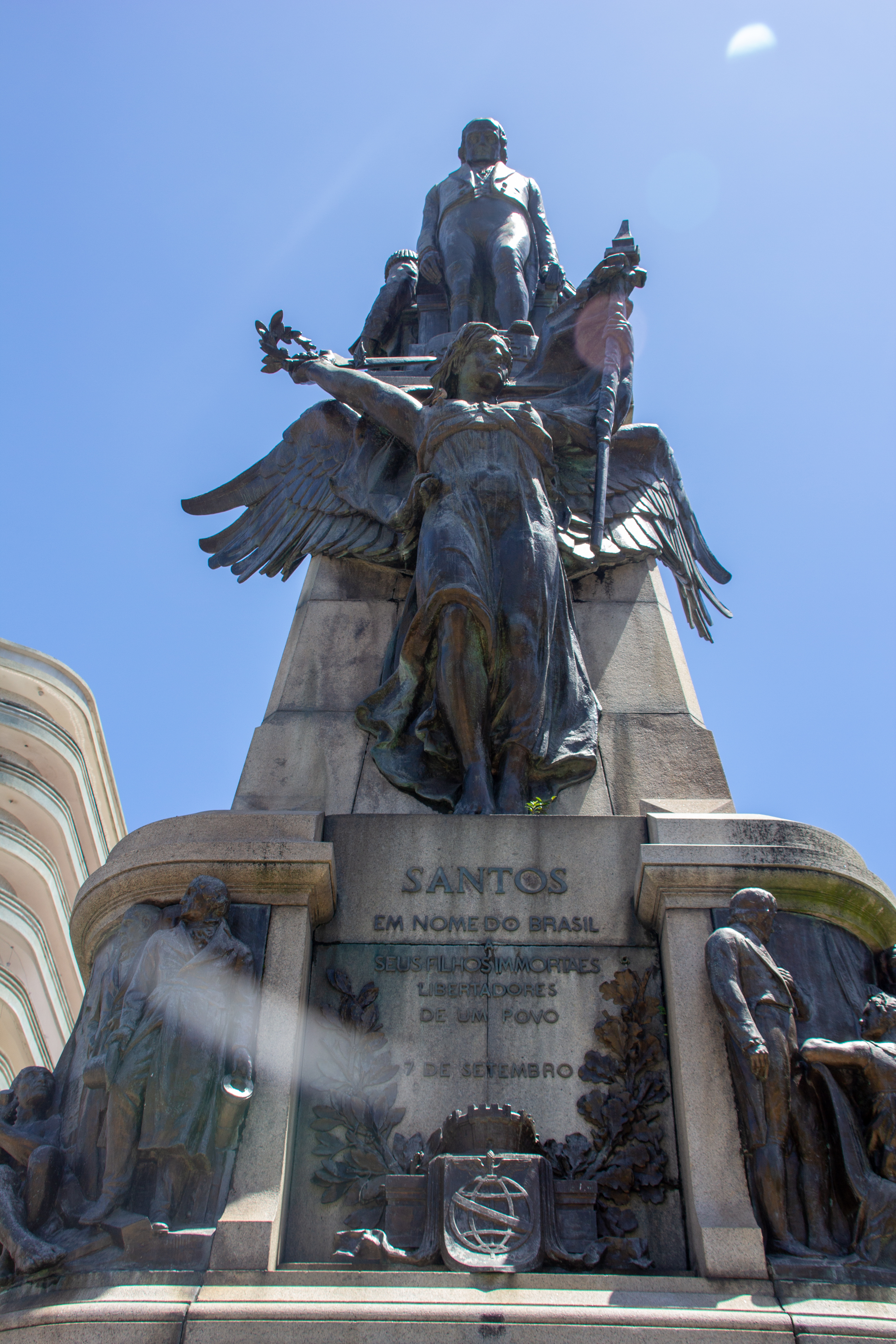
Monument to the Andrada brothers in Santos

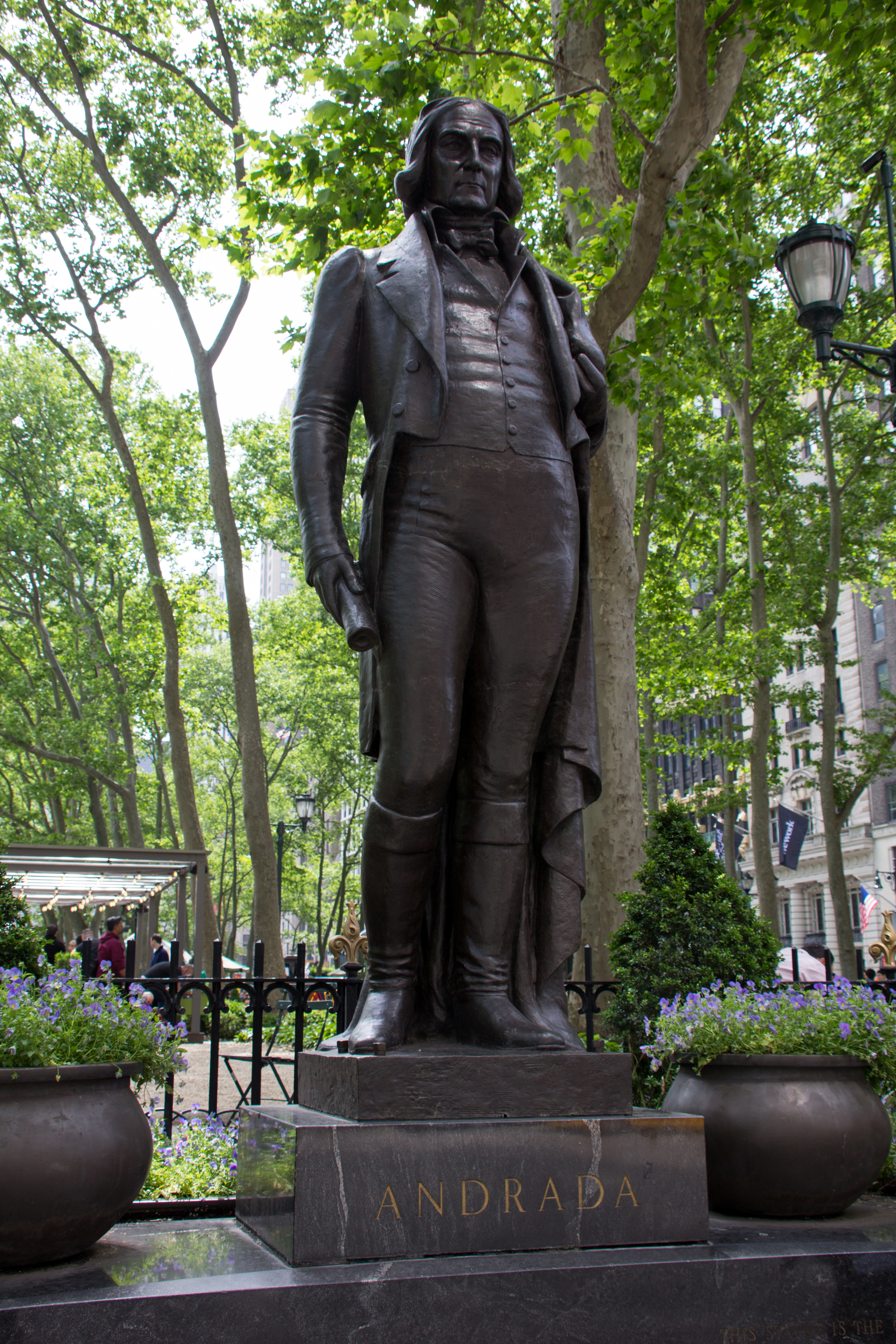
Statue at Bryant Park in Manhattan, New York City

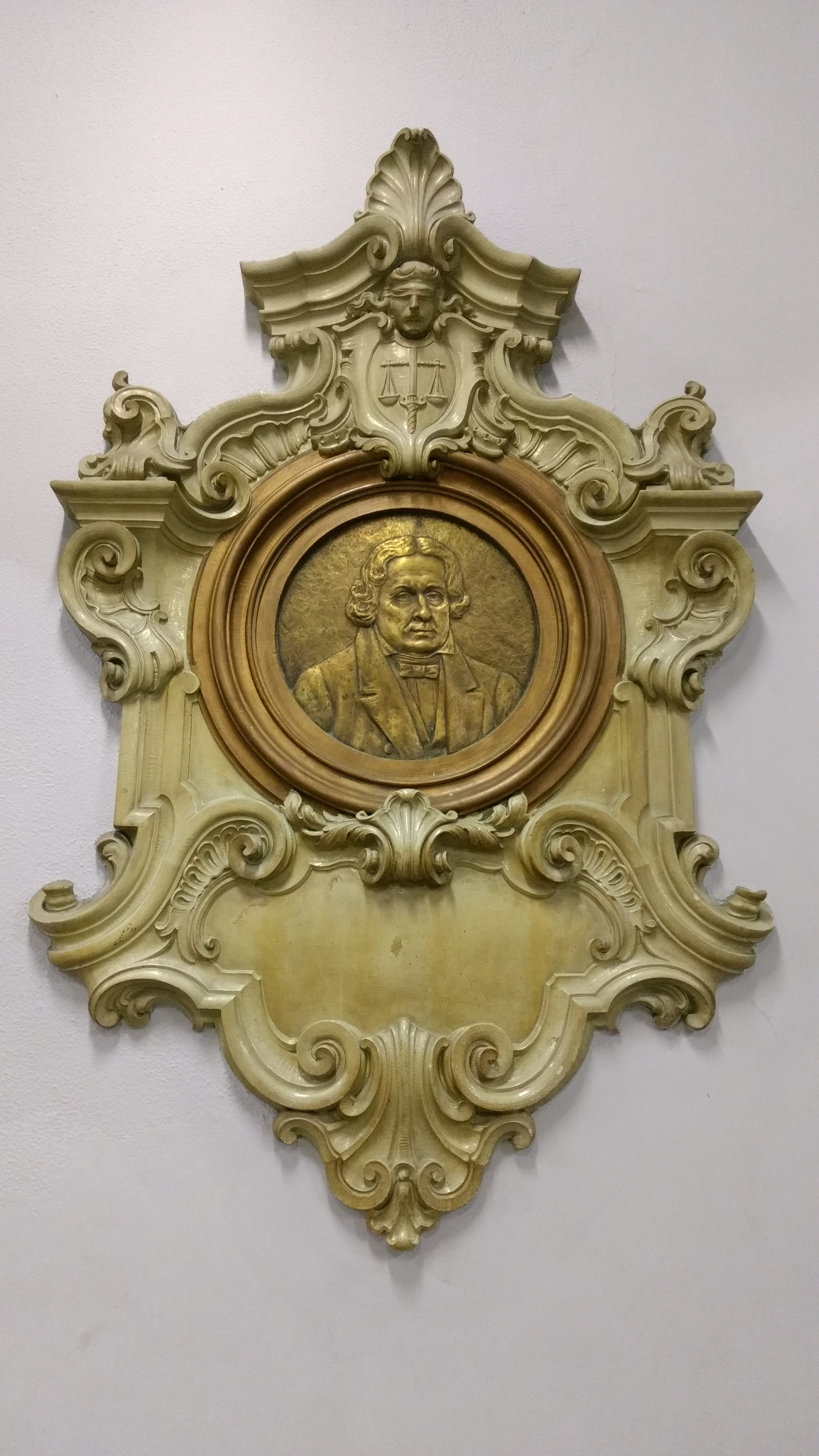
Plaque at the University of São Paulo Law School

== See also ==
- Statue of José Bonifácio de Andrada

== Bibliography ==
- BARRETO, Vicente. Ideology and politics in the thought of José Bonifácio de Andrada e Silva. Rio de Janeiro: Zahar, 1977.
- Mansfield, J (June 2012). "The geology of Utö". Dianium Science.
- Special issue of the bulletin of the Library of the Chamber of Deputies of Brazil. Bibliography regarding José Bonifácio. Brasilia, 1963.
- CALDEIRA, Jorge (org.). José Bonifácio de Andrada e Silva. (Col. Formadores do Brasil). São Paulo: Ed. 34. 2002.
- CAVALCANTE, Berenice. José Bonifácio: reason and sensibility, a history in three times. Rio de Janeiro: FGV, 2001.
- COELHO, José Maria Latino. Elogio Histórico de José Bonifácio. Rio de Janeiro: Edições Livros de Portugal, 1942.
- COSTA, Pedro Pereira da Silva. José Bonifácio. (Col. A vida dos grandes brasileiros, vol. 2). São Paulo: Editora Três, 1974.
- CRUZ, Guilherme Braga da. Coimbra and José Bonifácio de Andrada e Silva. Lisboa. Sep. "Memories of the Academy of Sciences of Lisbon – Class of Letters", 20, 1979.
- DOLNIKOFF, Miriam (org.). Projects for Brazil, José Bonifácio de Andrada e Silva. São Paulo: Cia. das Letras, 1998.
- DRUMOND, A. M. V. Annotations to a biography in vol. XIII dos Anais da Biblioteca Nacional.
- FALCÃO, Edgar Cerqueira de (org.). Scientific, political and social works of José Bonifácio de Andrada e Silva. Monumental edition celebrating the bicentennial anniversary of his birth (1963). Brasília: Câmara dos Deputados, 2006.
- GRAHAM, Maria. Journal of a voyage to Brazil and residence there during part of the years 1821, 1822, 1823. Belo Horizonte, Itatiaia; Publishing department of the University of São Paulo, 1990.
- MONTEIRO, Tobias. History of the Brazilian Empire. Rio de Janeiro: F. Briguiet & Cia. Editora, 1927, 1938.
- ROCHA POMBO, José Francisco da. History of Brazil. Edited by Helio Vianna. São Paulo: Edições Melhoramentos, 1963.
- SENADO FEDERAL. Political works of José Bonifácio. Brasília, 1972.
- SILVA, Ana Rosa Cloclet da. Building of the nation and slavery in the thought of Jose Bonifacio: 1783 – 1823. Campinas: Editora da Unicamp, 1999.
- SOUSA, Octávio Tarquínio de. História dos fundadores do Império do Brasil. (Vol. 1.) Rio de Janeiro: Livraria José Olympio Editora, 2ª edição, revista.
- SOUSA, Octávio Tarquínio de. José Bonifácio. Belo Horizonte: Editora Itatiaia, 1988.
- SOUSA, Alberto. The Andradas (3 vols.). São Paulo: Typographia Piratininga, 1922.
- VARELA, Alex Gonçalves. I swear by my honor as a good vassal and good Portuguese man. An analysis of the scientific annotations of José Bonifácio de Andrada e Silva (1780–1819). São Paulo: Annablume, 2006.
