= Statue of José Bonifácio de Andrada =

Bronze sculpture in Manhattan, New York, U.S.

José Bonifácio de Andrada e Silva
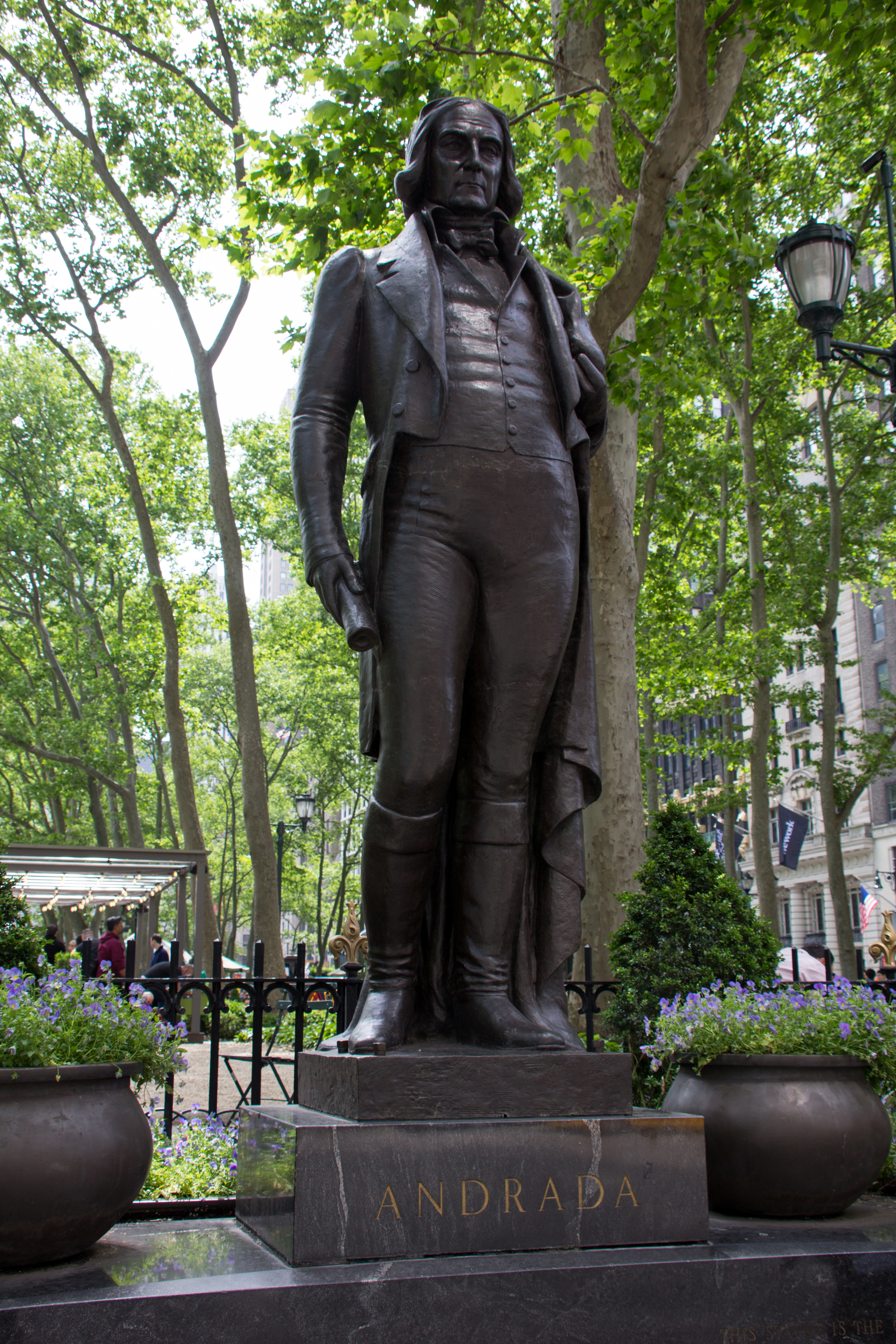
- The monument in 2014
- Artist: José Otavio Correia Lima
- Year: 1954
- Type: Sculpture
- Medium: Bronze
- Subject: José Bonifácio de Andrada
- Location: New York City, New York, United States; 40.754406°N 73.984249°W

José Bonifácio de Andrada e Silva, also known as the Andrada Monument, is an outdoor bronze sculpture of José Bonifácio de Andrada by José Otavio Correia Lima, located at Bryant Park in Manhattan, New York. It is 9 feet (2.7 m) tall and weights approximately 4,000 lbs. Lima was selected through a competition that was sponsored by the Brazilian government, which also donated $60,000 for the surrounding plaza and granite base.

== History ==
The sculpture was cast in 1954 and dedicated on April 22, 1955. Ceremony attendees included Manhattan Borough President Hulan Jack, Parks Commissioner Robert Moses, Brazilian Ambassador to the United States João Calos Muniz, Deputy Assistant Secretary of State of Inter-American Affairs Edward J. Spears, Cardinal Francis Spellman, and Mayor Robert F. Wagner, Jr. Originally located at the northwest corner of Bryant Park, it was moved to its current location along Avenue of the Americas, between 40th and 42nd Streets, in the early 1990s. Every September, the Consulate General of Brazil commemorates Andrada and Brazilian Independence Day by hosting a small ceremony at the monument.
