= Uvarovite =

Chromium-bearing garnet group

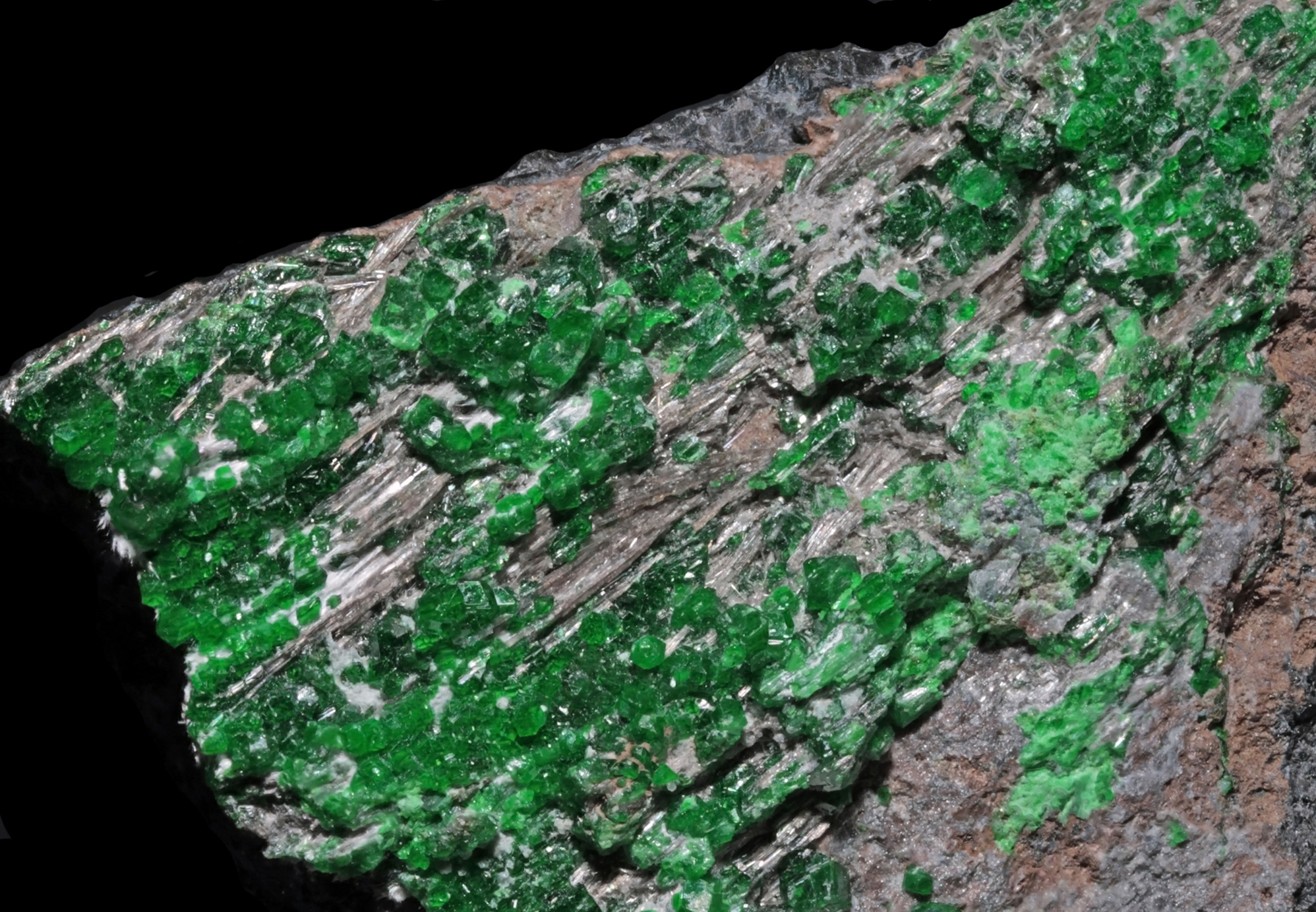

General
- Category: Nesosilicate
- Formula: Ca_{3}Cr_{2}Si_{3}O_{12}
- IMA symbol: Uv
- Strunz classification: 9.AD.25
- Crystal system: Cubic
- Crystal class: Hexoctahedral (m3̅m); H-M symbol: (4/m 3̅ 2/m)
- Space group: Ia3̅d
- Unit cell: a = 11.99 Å; Z = 8

Identification
- Color: Green, emerald-green, green-black
- Crystal habit: Euhedral crystals, granular, massive
- Fracture: Uneven, conchoidal
- Mohs scale hardness: 6.5–7.5
- Luster: Vitreous
- Streak: White
- Diaphaneity: Transparent, translucent
- Specific gravity: 3.77–3.81
- Optical properties: Isotropic
- Refractive index: n = 1.865
- Other characteristics: Fluorescent red in both short and long UV

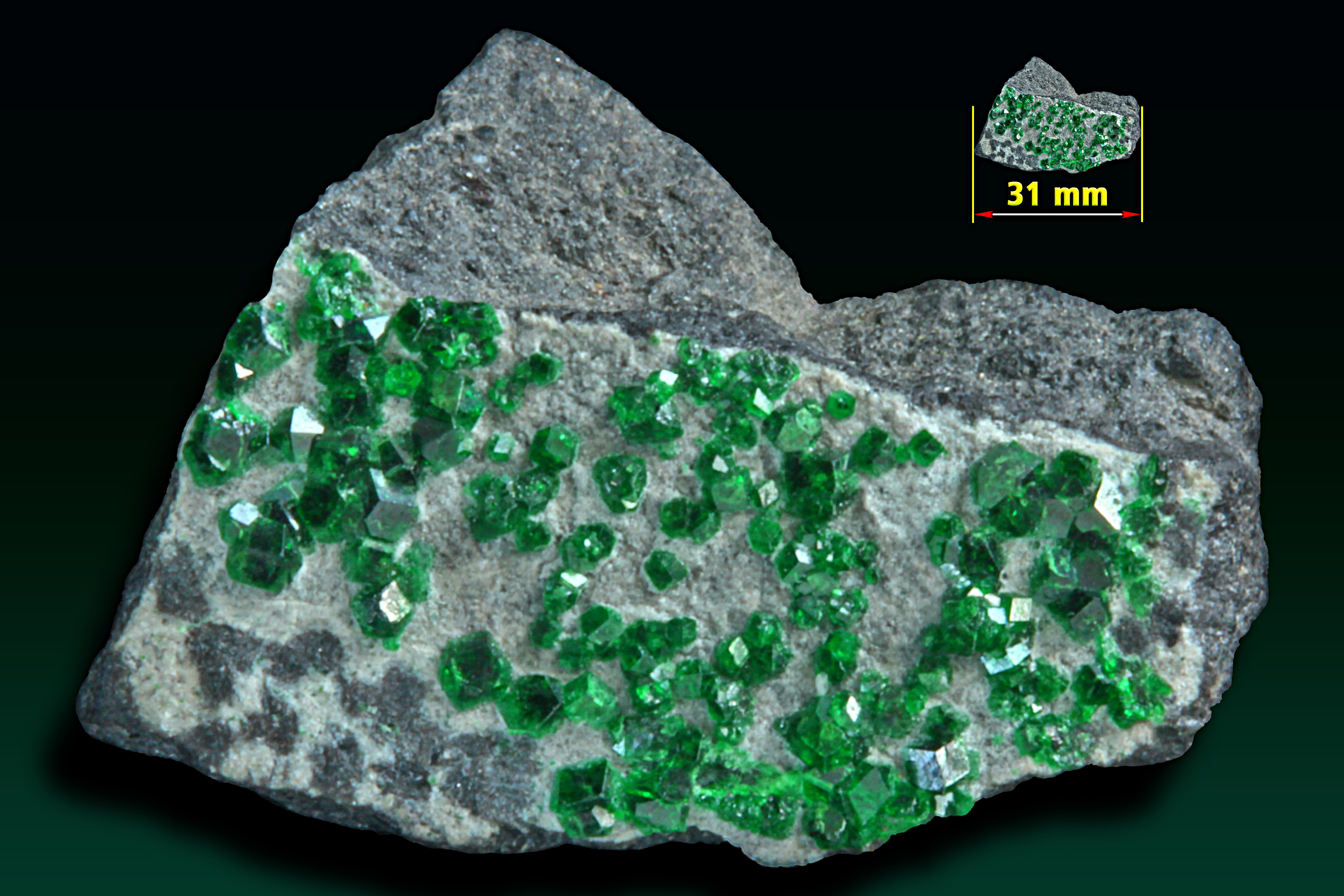
Uvarovite – Saranowskiy Mine, Ural. Russia.

Uvarovite is a chromium-bearing garnet group species with the formula: Ca_{3}Cr_{2}(SiO_{4})_{3}. It was discovered in 1832 by Germain Henri Hess who named it after Count Sergei Uvarov (1765–1855), a Russian statesman and amateur mineral collector. It is classified in the ugrandite group alongside the other calcium-bearing garnets andradite and grossular.

Uvarovite is the rarest of the common members of the garnet group, and is the only consistently green garnet species, with an emerald-green color. It occurs as well-formed fine-sized crystals.

== Occurrence ==
Uvarovite most commonly occurs in solid solution with grossular or andradite, and is generally found associated with serpentinite, chromite, metamorphic limestones, and skarn ore-bodies.

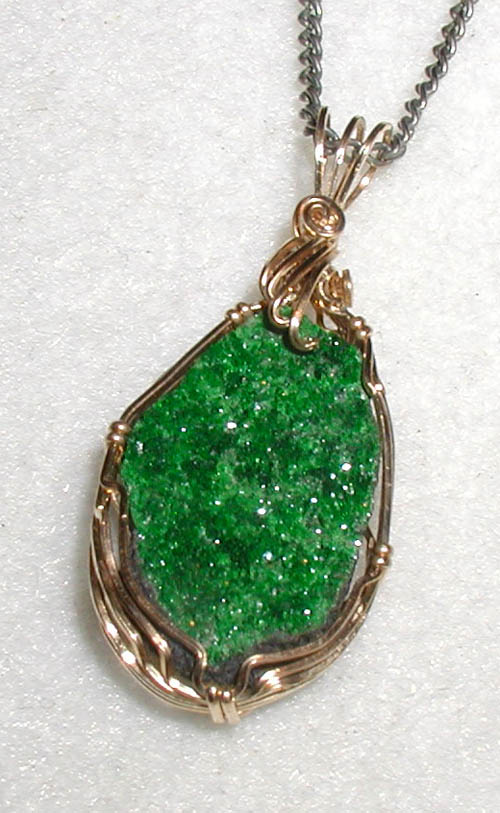
Pendant in uvarovite, a rare bright-green garnet. The long dimension is 2 cm (0.8 inch)

The most significant source of uvarovite historically has been a now-closed copper mine at Outokumpu, Finland, from where most museum specimens have been collected. The uvarovite crystals found in the Outokumpu district are among a wide range of chromium-rich silicate phases found in association with volcanogenic copper-cobalt-zinc sulfide ore deposits which are known to have an unusually high chromium content.

Uvarovite occurrences in the United States are predominantly found in the western portion of the country, including localities in New Mexico, Arizona, and California. In the eastern United States, uvarovite has been confirmed in Lancaster County, Pennsylvania. The mineral has also been reported from eastern Cuba. 9 grains of uvarovite occur in a heavy mineral fraction of bulk stream sediment HM-10 collected in Bunker Hill creek, below the historic Bunker Hill gold mine, south of Nelson in British Columbia Canada. Its source is likely near serpentinites and argillaceous limestones within about 450 m upstream of the silt site.

Notable localities in Europe besides the Outokumpu site known to bear uvarovite include Røros, Norway; Pitkyaranta, Russia; Val Malenco, Italy; Pico do Posets near Venasque, Spain; Kip Daglari, Turkey; and Biserk and Sarany, Russia. In Africa, uvarovite has been reported from the Bushveld Igneous Complex of Transvaal, South Africa and from the Vumba Schist Belt in Botswana. In Asia, uvarovite has been reported from Taiwan and Japan. In Australia, uvarovite has been reported from chromite deposits in southern New South Wales.

== Properties ==
Minerals in the uvarovite-grossular series are stable up to temperatures of 1410 °C at low pressure.

== See also ==
- List of minerals named after people
