= Wiluite =

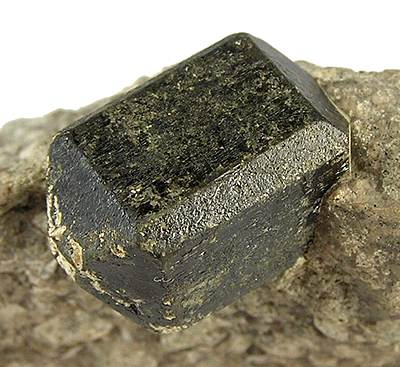
- Wiluite crystal from the Wilui River, Siberia

General
- Category: Sorosilicates
- Formula: Ca_{19}(Al,Mg,Fe,Ti)_{13}(B,Al,[ ])_{5}Si_{18}O_{68}(O,OH)_{10}
- IMA symbol: Wil
- Strunz classification: 9.BG.35
- Crystal system: Tetragonal
- Crystal class: Ditetragonal dipyramidal (4/mmm); H-M symbol: (4/m 2/m 2/m)
- Space group: P4/nnc
- Unit cell: a = 15.716, c = 11.704 [Å]; Z = 2

Identification
- Color: Dark green
- Crystal habit: Typically as euhedral crystals
- Cleavage: {100} poor
- Fracture: Irregular
- Mohs scale hardness: 6
- Luster: Vitreous
- Specific gravity: 3.36
- Optical properties: Uniaxial (+)
- Refractive index: n_{ω} = 1.721 n_{ε} = 1.725
- Birefringence: δ = 0.004

Wiluite is a dark green, brownish, or black blocky silicate mineral with the chemical formula Ca_{19}(Al,Mg,Fe,Ti)_{13}(B,Al,[ ])_{5}Si_{18}O_{68}(O,OH)_{10}. It has a Mohs hardness of 6 and a specific gravity of 3.36. It has a vitreous lustre, poor cleavage and an irregular brittle fracture. It crystallizes in the tetragonal system and occurs as well-formed crystals with good external form. It is isostructural with the vesuvianite group and is associated with wollastonite and olive-green grossulars (viluites) in a serpentinized skarn.

The minerals that wiluite and viluite refer to have often been confused, and may refer to grossular, or wiluite. It was discovered in the 1990s and named for the Wilui River region, Sakha Republic (Yakutia), Russia.

Viluite was introduced as a mineral name twice. Von Leonhard used it for a mineral that was considered the same as vesuvianite. However, that material was recently shown to be rich in boron and thus different from vesuvianite. In 1998 that material was named Wiluite. The other author to introduce viluite was Severgin, who used it in reference to what is widely known as grossular, a member of the garnet group.
