= Demantoid =

Green gemstone variety of the mineral andradite

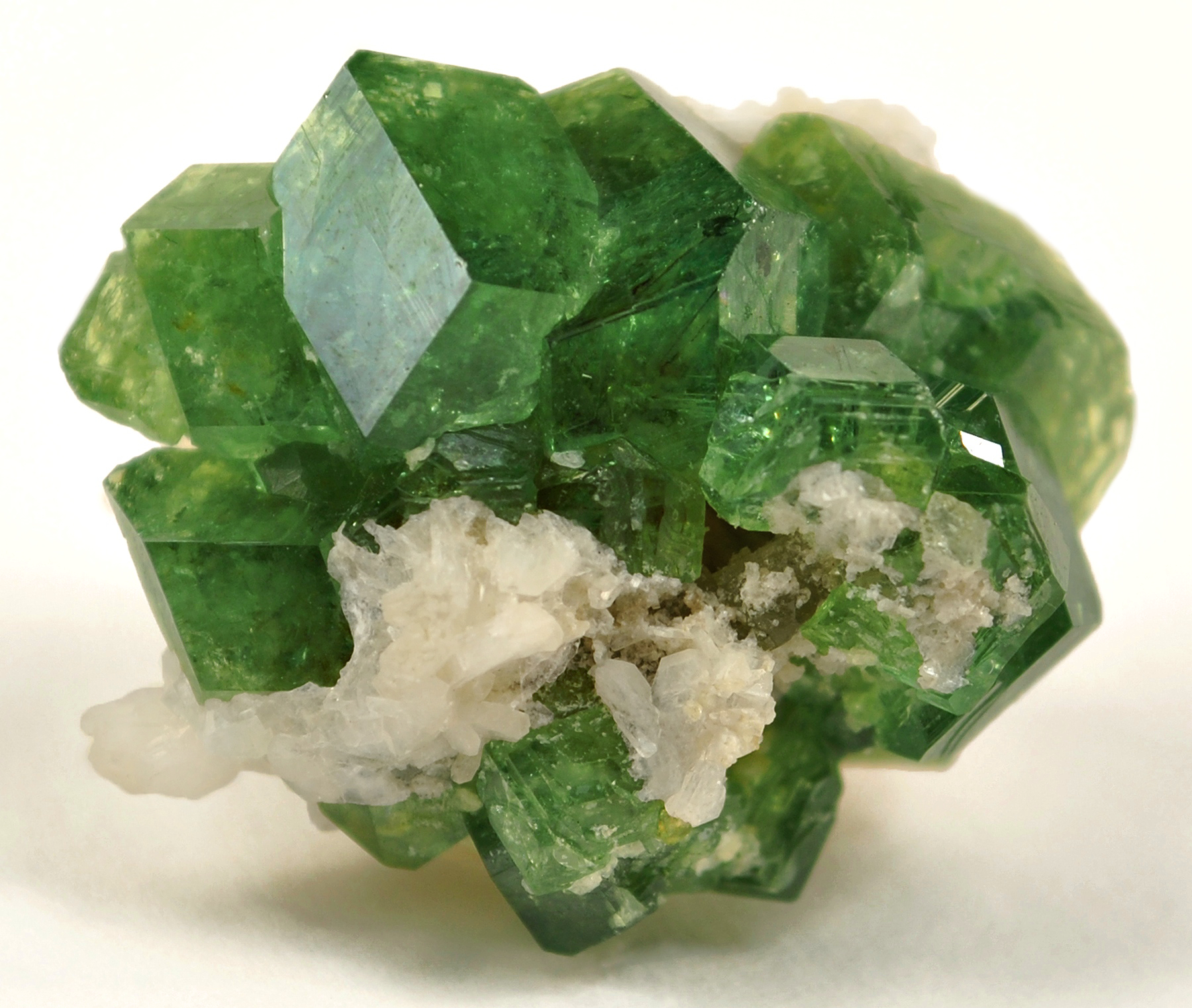
- Demantoid with stilbite

General
- Category: Minerals
- Formula: Ca_{3}Fe_{2}Si_{3}O_{12}
- Crystal system: cubic

Identification
- Color: light to deep green
- Mohs scale hardness: 6.5–7.0
- Luster: adamantine
- Specific gravity: 3.84
- Optical properties: Single Refractive
- Refractive index: 1.880–1.889
- Pleochroism: none
- Dispersion: 0.057
- Common impurities: Cr

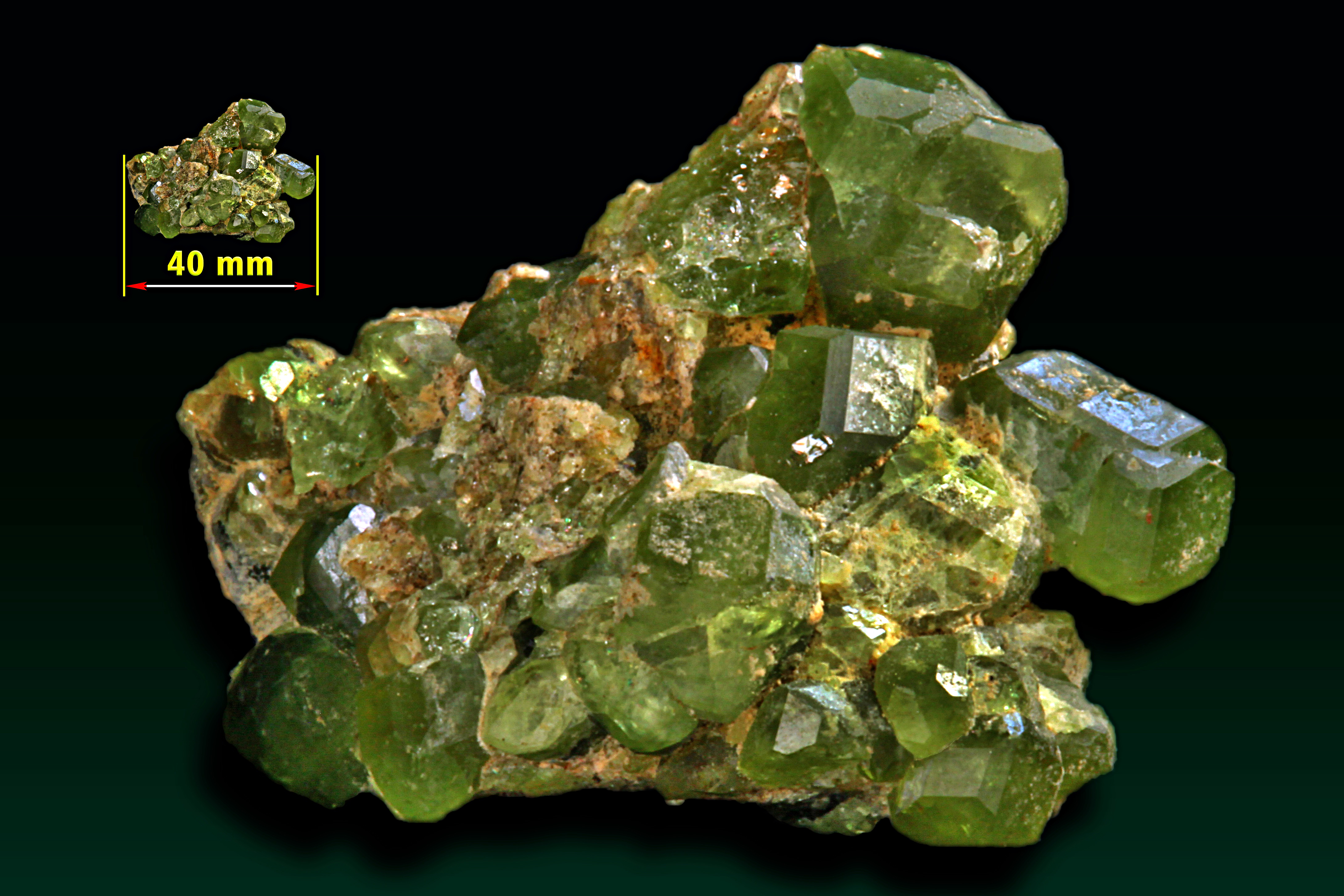
Garnet demantoid - Antetezambato, Ambanja District, Diana (Northern) Region, Antsiranana Province, Madagaskar.

Demantoid is the green gemstone variety of the mineral andradite, a member of the garnet group of minerals. Andradite is a calcium- and iron-rich garnet. The chemical formula is Ca_{3}Fe_{2}(SiO_{4})_{3} with chromium substitution as the cause of the demantoid green color. Ferric iron is the cause of the yellow in the stone.

It has the misnomers olivine and Uralian emerald.

In approximately 2003, reports began to circulate in the trade that some Russian demantoid garnets were being routinely subjected to heat treatment in order to enhance their color. Such treatment is believed to be performed at relatively low temperatures and is thought not to be detectable by gemological testing.

== History ==
Although garnets have been known since ancient times, the demantoid variety was not discovered until 1851 in Russia's western central Ural Mountains. The find was an alluvial deposit about 110 km (70 mi) from Ekaterinburg, north by northwest along the Bobrovka River, near the village of Elizavetinskoye. Miners were immediately stunned by the highly refractive nature of the gem material, which is atypical for garnet. They began comparing it to diamond and referred to it as "demantoid", from the old German Demant, meaning diamond. The reason is obvious, with its high brilliance and dispersion.

A second find was made 75 km (47 mi) to the south of Ekaterinburg, on the Chusovaya and Chrisolitka Rivers southwest of the village of Poldnevaya. Deposits are also found underground up to 3 m (10 ft) deep in the demantoid placier. In all, there are five deposits of demantoid in this area. Possessing an unusual green color and a dispersion greater than that of diamond, it quickly became a treasured and expensive gemstone. From the time of the demantoids find until about 1919, they were popular in Russia as the famous Peter Carl Fabergé made jewelry with them. In austere Communist Russia, these gems went out of style.

More stones were found in the Bobrovka River in the 1970s and 1980s. Around 1999, very limited production occurred in the central Ural Mountains. Many of the stones found then are for sale today. Mining takes place along the rivers today, but some mining is still done secretively.

A significant new find of demantoid and andradite took place in Namibia in 1996 at what is now dubbed the "Green Dragon" mine.

In addition to the commercially-important deposits in Russia and Namibia, demantoids are also found in some other places, including Italy (Val Malenco, Lombardy), Iran (Kerman), and Afghanistan.

The Iranian demantoids exhibit a spatial distribution restricted to two distinct locations: Baft, Kerman province (Southeastern Iran), and Takab, West Azerbaijan (Northwestern Iran). Petrographically, the Baft demantoids are associated with serpentinite schist lithologies, whereas the Takab specimens are exclusively hosted within skarn metamorphic rocks.

Around 2009, there was a significant discovery of demantoid and andradite garnet in Madagascar.

== Appearance ==
Demantoid is the green variety of andradite garnet, so demantoids are always primarily green (by definition), but the exact shade ranges from a very strong yellowish green to nearly the color of a fine emerald. Some stones have a brownish cast, which is due to iron. Its dispersion (0.057) is unusually high, and this is often visible as "fire" (rainbow-coloured flashes of light), although in some cases the stone's green body colour can render this effect less noticeable. Their luster is adamantine. Demantoid also has a high refractive index of 1.80 to 1.89.

Demantoids are generally small, with finished stones generally under 1 carat (200 mg) and stones over 2 carats (400 mg) are rare. Stones over 3 carats (600 mg) are very rare.

Stones with more intense green coloration are generally highly valued, but lighter stones of yellowish green display substantially more fire. The choice of stone color or fire can therefore be a matter of personal preference, with some preferring the more yellowish-green stones to the spring green stones.

== Horsetails ==
Russian demantoid often contain inclusions of chrysotile, which is a type of asbestos. These fibers radiate out from a very small crystal of chromite. These inclusions are feathery golden threads that tend to curve and resemble the tail of a horse, and are therefore referred to as horsetail inclusions. In gemology, the presence of such inclusions is regarded as 'diagnostic' for natural demantoid (i.e. these inclusions are not found in any other green gemstone). Some gemstones are more valuable for their inclusions, and 'horsetails' can be regarded as desirable features in demantoid, as they are taken as an indication of prestigious Russian origin, although some demantoids from certain other locations (such as Italy and Iran) may also contain 'horsetails', which are regarded as being characteristic of a serpentinite geographic origin, and, on the other hand, not all Russian demantoids actually contain 'horsetails'. The microstructure of some demantoids is believed to be affected by the presence of 'horsetails' (the 'horsetail' typically originates towards the centre of the nodule, with the fibres branching out and radiating towards the surface), whereas horsetail-free demantoids from other sources frequently display flat crystal faces.
