= Cyprine (mineral) =

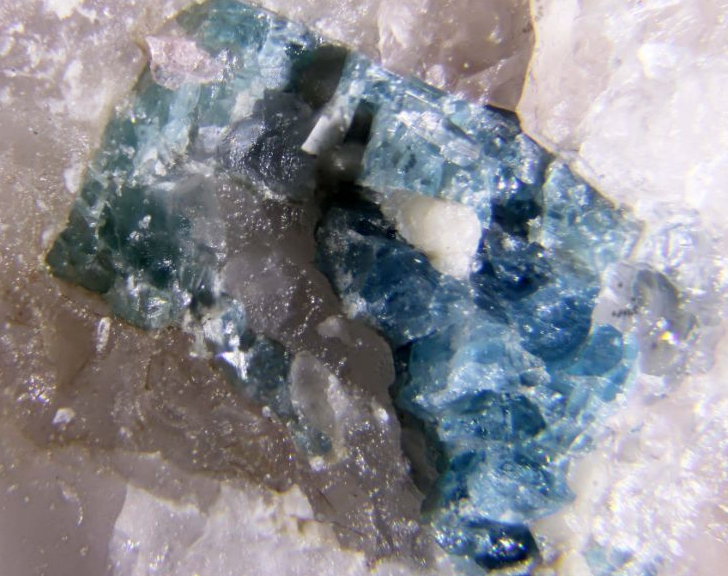

General
- Category: Silicate mineral variety
- Formula: Ca_{19}Cu^{2+}(Al_{10}Mg_{2})Si_{18}O_{68}(OH)_{10}
- IMA symbol: Cyp
- Crystal system: Tetragonal
- Crystal class: Dipyramidal (4/m); H-M symbol: (4/m)
- Space group: Tetragonal; Space group: P4/n
- Unit cell: a = 15.52, c = 11.82 [Å] (approximated)

Identification

Cyprine is a copper-rich member of the vesuvianite group with the formula Ca_{19}Cu^{2+}(Al_{10}Mg_{2})Si_{18}O_{68}(OH)_{10}. A similar name is given to a Cu-bearing variety but not Cu-dominant member within the group. Cyprine (sensu stricto) was discovered in the Wessels mine in the vicinity of Hotazel, Kalahari Manganese Field, South Africa.

== Relation to other minerals ==
Cyprine belongs to the vesuvianite group.
