= Campbell R. Bridges =

Scottish-born Kenyan gemologist

Campbell R. Bridges (1937 – 11 August 2009) was a Scottish-born Kenyan gemologist.

Bridges, originally from Scotland, lived in Kenya with his family and regularly mined for rare gemstones with his son Bruce Bridges. The discovery of the green variety of garnet known as tsavorite and the importation of tanzanite into the west solidified his reputation and led to a consultancy with Tiffany & Co. in 1973.

Bridges was attacked by a gang of 20 men armed with clubs, spears, bows and arrows in the town of Voi and died of his injuries on arrival at hospital. He was 71. Kenyan police made an arrest for the murder on 19 August 2009. As of late 2012, the trial of the eight people charged in the crime continues. As of December 2014, murderers Mohammed Dadi Kokane, Alfred Njuruka Makoko, Samuel Mwagainia and James Mwita are sentenced to a total of 160 years in prison by Judge Maureen Odero.
