= Grossular =

Garnet, nesosilicate mineral

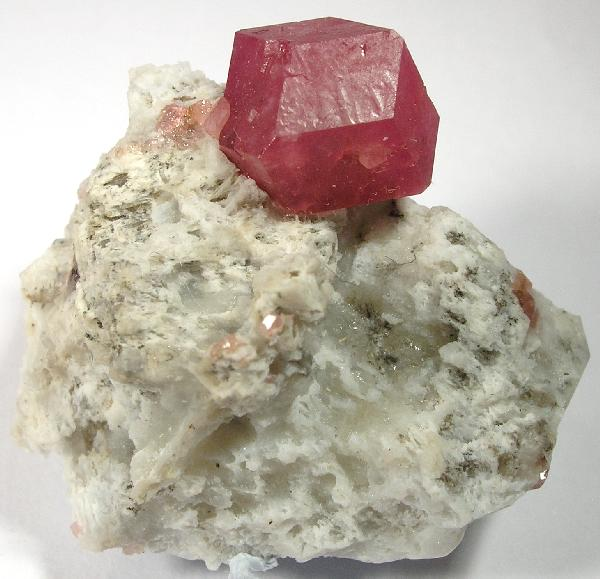
- Grossular dodecahedron, 7 mm across, from Coahuila, Mexico

General
- Category: Nesosilicate
- Formula: Ca_{3}Al_{2}(SiO_{4})_{3}
- IMA symbol: Grs
- Strunz classification: 9.AD.25
- Crystal system: Cubic
- Crystal class: Hexoctahedral (m3̅m); H-M Symbol: (4/m 3̅ 2/m)
- Space group: Ia3̅d

Identification
- Color: light to dark green, light to dark yellow to reddish brown, brown, orange, red, yellow, green, white, occasionally translucent to opaque pink. It is also but rarely found in colorless form
- Cleavage: none
- Fracture: conchoidal to uneven
- Mohs scale hardness: 6.5 to 7
- Luster: greasy to vitreous
- Streak: Brown
- Specific gravity: 3.61 (+.15/−.04)
- Polish luster: vitreous
- Optical properties: Single refractive, often anomalous double refractive
- Refractive index: 1.740 (+.12/−.04)
- Birefringence: none
- Pleochroism: none
- Dispersion: .028
- Ultraviolet fluorescence: near colorless to light green – inert to weak orange in longwave and weak yellow-orange in shortwave; yellow – inert to weak orange in longwave and shortwave
- Absorption spectra: Hessonite sometimes shows bands at 407 and 430 nm

Major varieties
- Hessonite: yellow-red to reddish-orange
- Tsavorite: intense green to yellowish green
- Leuco-garnet: transparent and colorless
- Rosolite: translucent to opaque pink grossularite crystals in marble from Mexico

Grossular is a calcium-aluminium species of the garnet group of minerals. It has the chemical formula of Ca_{3}Al_{2}(SiO_{4})_{3} but the calcium may, in part, be replaced by ferrous iron and the aluminium by ferric iron. The name grossular is derived from the botanical name for the gooseberry, grossularia, in reference to the green garnet of this composition that is found in Siberia. Other shades include cinnamon brown (cinnamon stone variety), red, and yellow. Grossular is a gemstone.

In geological literature, grossular has often been called grossularite. Since 1971, however, use of the term grossularite for the mineral has been discouraged by the International Mineralogical Association.

== Hessonite ==
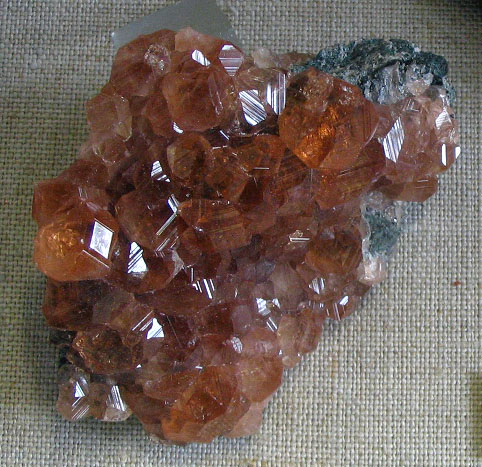
Striated crystals of hessonite, a variety of the grossular species

Hessonite or "cinnamon stone" is a common variety of grossular with the general formula: Ca_{3}Al_{2}Si_{3}O_{12}. The name comes from the Ancient Greek: ἣσσων (hēssōn), meaning inferior; an allusion to its lower hardness and lower density than most other garnet species varieties.

It has a characteristic red color, inclining to orange or yellow, much like that of zircon. It was shown many years ago, by Sir Arthur Herbert Church, that many gemstones, especially engraved gems (commonly regarded as zircon), were actually hessonite. The difference is readily detected by the specific gravity, that of hessonite being 3.64 to 3.69, while that of zircon is about 4.6. Hessonite has a similar hardness to that of quartz (being about 7 on the mohs scale), while the hardness of most garnet species is nearer 7.5.

Hessonite comes chiefly from Sri Lanka and India, where it is found generally in placer deposits, though its occurrence in its native matrix is not unknown. It is also found in Brazil and California.

== Deposits ==
Grossular is found in contact metamorphosed limestones with vesuvianite, diopside, wollastonite and wernerite.

A highly sought after variety of gem garnet is the fine green Grossular garnet from Kenya and Tanzania called tsavorite. This garnet was discovered in the 1960s in the Tsavo area of Kenya, from which the gem takes its name.

Viluite is a variety name of grossular; that is not a recognized mineral species. It is usually olive green though sometimes brownish or reddish, brought about by impurities in the crystal. Viluite is found associated with and is similar in appearance to vesuvianite, and there is confusion in terminology as viluite has long been used as a synonym for wiluite, a sorosilicate of the vesuvianite group. This confusion in nomenclature dates back to James Dwight Dana. It comes from the Vilyuy river area in Siberia. A similar green grossular garnet can be found in the Wah Wah mountain range in Utah.

Grossular is known by many other names, and also some misnomers; colophonite – coarse granules of garnet (was later identified as a variety of andradite), ernite, gooseberry-garnet – light green colored and translucent, olyntholite/olytholite, romanzovite, and tellemarkite. Misnomers include South African jade, garnet jade, Transvaal jade, and African jade.

== Cultural significance ==
In 1991, Vermont named grossular garnet its state gemstone.

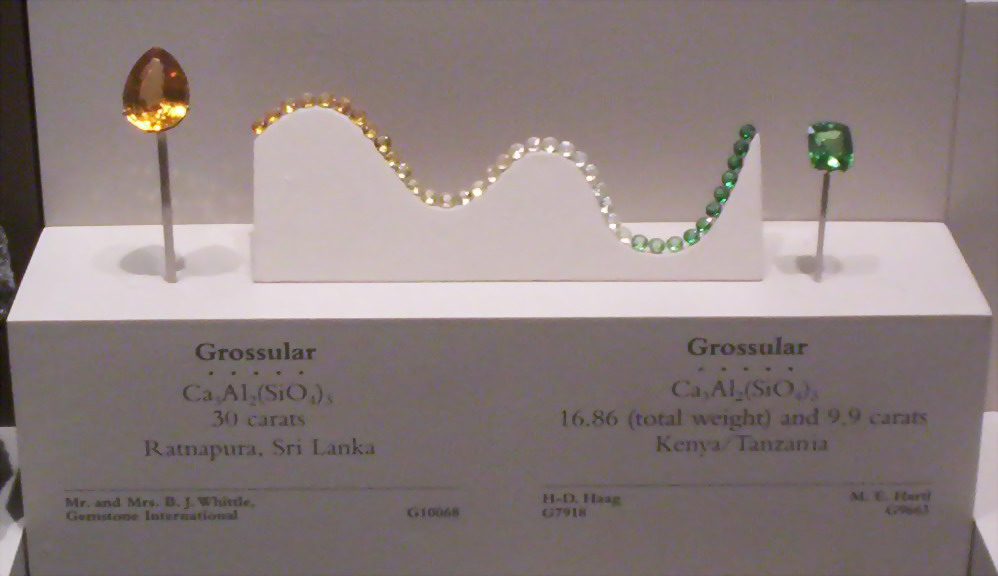
Color range of grossular graphically displayed at the National Museum of Natural History Washington, D.C.

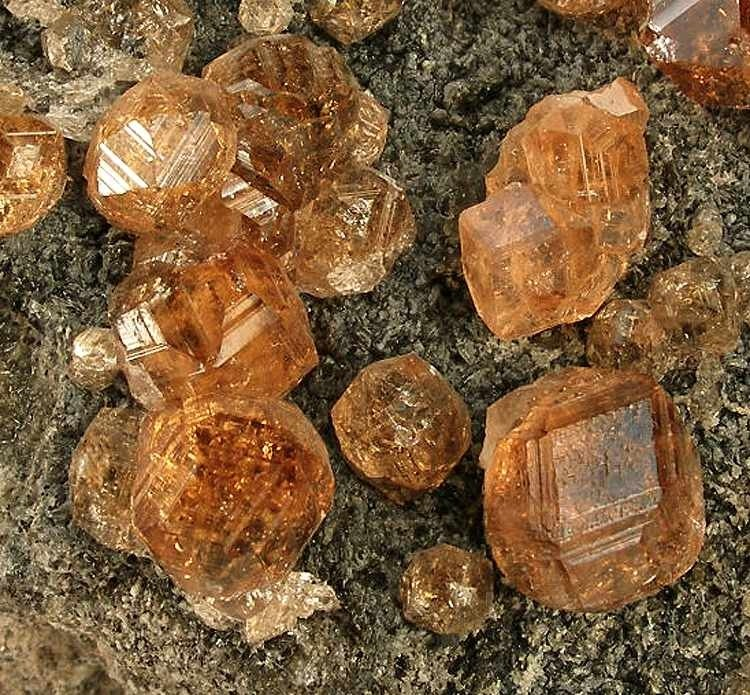
Group of Grossular crystals, largest 1.1 cm, from Val-des-Sources, Quebec

== See also ==
- Hydrogrossular
