= Tsavorite =

Variety of grossular

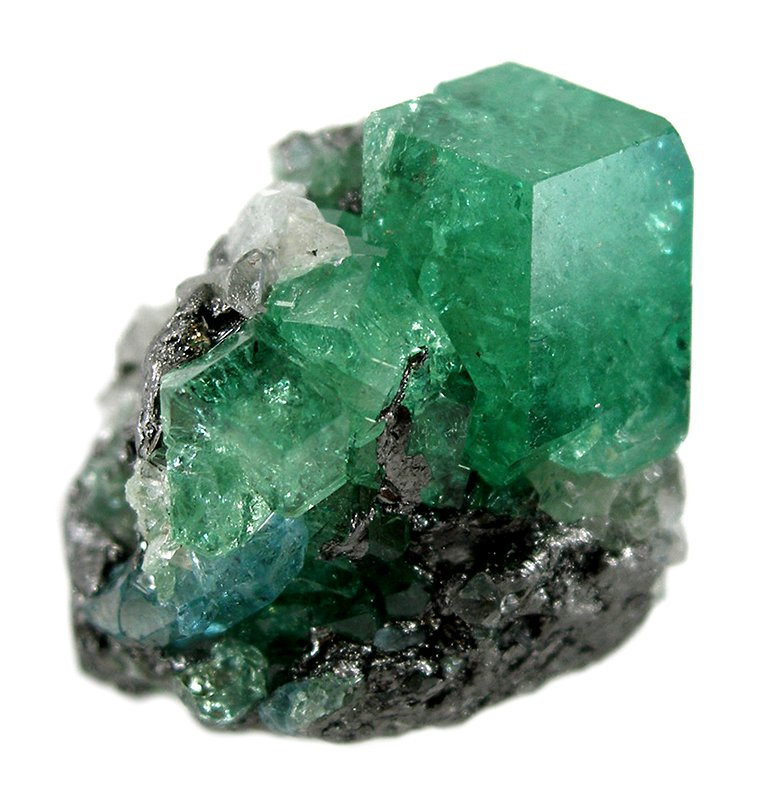
- Tsavorite garnet on matrix of silvery black graphite and a minor blue apatite

General
- Category: Nesosilicate
- Formula: Ca_{3}Al_{2}Si_{3}O_{12}
- Crystal system: Cubic

Identification
- Color: Light to deep green
- Mohs scale hardness: 7.0–7.5
- Specific gravity: 3.60–3.68
- Optical properties: Single refractive
- Refractive index: 1.740
- Dispersion: 0.028

Tsavorite or tsavolite is a variety of the garnet group species grossular, a calcium-aluminium garnet with the formula Ca_{3}Al_{2}Si_{3}O_{12}. Trace amounts of vanadium or chromium provide the green color.

In 1967, British gem prospector and geologist Campbell R. Bridges discovered a deposit of green grossular in the mountains of Simanjiro District of Manyara Region of north-east Tanzania in a place called Lemshuko, 15 km (9.3 mi) away from Komolo, the first village. The specimens he found were of very intense color and of high transparency. The find interested the gem trade, and attempts were made to export the stones, but the Tanzanian government did not provide permits.

Believing that the deposit was a part of a larger geological structure extending possibly into Kenya, Bridges began prospecting in that nation. He was successful a second time in 1971, when he found the mineral variety there, and was granted a permit to mine the deposit. The gemstone was known only to mineral specialists until 1974, when Tiffany and Co launched a marketing campaign which brought broader recognition of the stone.

Bridges was murdered in 2009 when a mob attacked him and his son on their property in Tsavo East National Park. It is believed that the attack was connected to a three-year dispute over access and control of Bridges' gemstone mines.

The name tsavorite was proposed by Tiffany and Co president Henry Platt in honor of Tsavo East National Park in Kenya. Apart from this source and the first discovered locality in Manyara, Tanzania, it is also found in Toliara (Tuléar) Province, Madagascar. Small deposits of gem grade material have been found in Pakistan and Queen Maud Land, Antarctica. No other occurrences of gem material have yet been discovered.

Rare in gem-quality over several carats (1 carat = 200 mg), tsavorite has been found in larger sizes. In late 2006, a 925-carat (185.0 g) crystal was discovered. It yielded an oval mixed-cut 325 carat (65 g) stone, one of the largest, if not the largest, faceted tsavorites in the world. A crystal that yielded a 120.68-carat (24.136 g) oval mixed-cut gem was also uncovered in early 2006. The Lion of Merelani is a square cushion cut tsavorite that weighs 116.76 carats and has 177 facets. It is on display at the Smithsonian Institution.

Tsavorite formed in a Neoproterozoic metamorphic event which involved extensive folding and refolding of rock. This resulted in a wide range of inclusions forming within most Tsavorite crystals. These inclusions are strong identifying features in Tsavorite.
