= Vasily Severgin =

Russian mineralogist

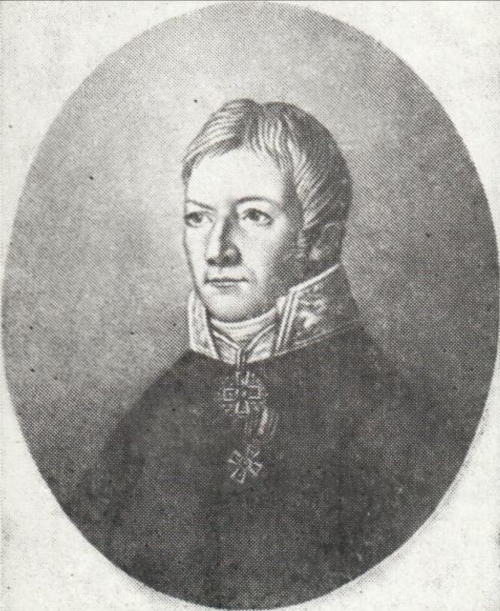

Vasily Mikhailovich Severgin (Russian: Василий Михайлович Севергин; 19 September 1765 – 29 November 1826) was a Russian academician, chemist, mineralogist, and geologist. For three decades, he was the only academician elected to the Geological Society of London. He has been described as being among the most influential pioneers of geology in Russia.

== Biography ==
Severgin was born in St. Petersburg, the son of a court musician. He studied at the Gymnasium of the St. Petersburg Academy (1776) of Sciences and then went to the university in 1784 to study mineralogy. He then completed his studies at the University of Göttingen (1789) after studying basalts in the region. He trained under J.F. Gmelin. He examined the contemporary dispute between the neptunists and plutonists. In 1789 he returned to present papers on basalt and argued against the neptunists, suggesting that basalts formed from molten liquid. In 1789 he was made adjunct chair of mineralogy and began to examine mineral chemistry based on ideas from Lavoisier. He published a book based on Kirwan's Elements of Mineralogy (1791). His book on the foundations of mineralogy (1798) was the first Russian text dealing with ideas on chemical analysis and rock formation. He travelled widely between 1802 and 1804 visiting most of western Russia, the Baltic region, Poland and Finland collecting mineral samples and visiting educational institutions, mines, and factories. Severgin was the founding editor of the journal Tekhnologicheskii zhurnal begun in 1803. He edited it until his death in 1826.

== Literature ==
- Ушакова, Нина Николаевна, Фигуровский, Николай Александрович: Василий Михайлович Севергин, 1765-1826 гг, Изд-во "Наука", 1981
