= Vesuvianite =

Silicate mineral

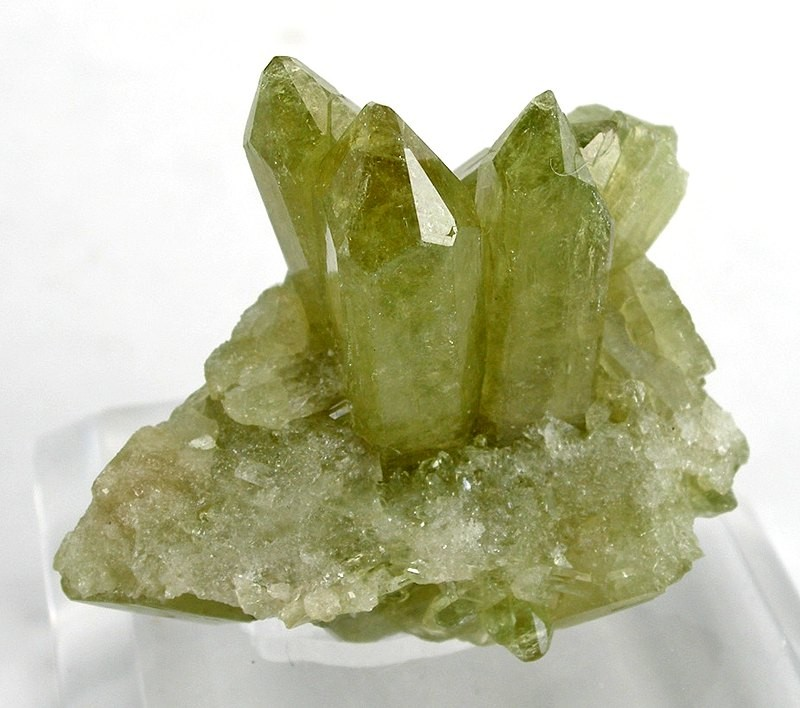
- Vesuvianite from the Jeffrey Mine in Val-des-Sources, Quebec

General
- Category: Sorosilicate
- Formula: Ca_{10}(Mg, Fe)_{2}Al_{4}(SiO_{4})_{5}(Si_{2}O_{7})_{2}(OH,F)_{4}
- IMA symbol: Ves
- Strunz classification: 9.BG.35
- Crystal system: Tetragonal
- Crystal class: Ditetragonal dipyramidal (4/mmm); H-M symbol: (4/m 2/m 2/m)
- Space group: P4/nnc
- Unit cell: a = 15.52 Å, c = 11.82 Å Z = 2

Identification
- Color: Yellow, green, brown; colorless to white, brown-black, light green, emerald green, violet, blue-green to blue, pink, purple, red, black, commonly zoned
- Crystal habit: Short pyramidal to long prismatic crystals common, massive to columnar
- Twinning: Fine twin domains observed
- Cleavage: Poor on {110} and {100} very poor on {001}
- Fracture: Sub conchoidal to irregular
- Tenacity: Brittle
- Mohs scale hardness: 6–7
- Luster: Vitreous to resinous
- Streak: White
- Diaphaneity: Subtransparent to translucent
- Specific gravity: 3.32–3.43
- Optical properties: Uniaxial (−)
- Refractive index: n_{ω} = 1.703–1.752 n_{ε} = 1.700–1.746
- Birefringence: 0.004–0.006
- Pleochroism: slight in colored varieties
- Solubility: Vesuvianite is virtually insoluble in acids
- Other characteristics: striated lengthwise

Vesuvianite, also known as idocrase, is a green, brown, yellow, or blue silicate mineral. Vesuvianite occurs as tetragonal crystals in skarn deposits and limestones that have been subjected to contact metamorphism. It was first discovered within included blocks or adjacent to lavas on Mount Vesuvius, hence its name. Attractive-looking crystals are sometimes cut as gemstones. Localities which have yielded fine crystallized specimens include Mount Vesuvius and the Ala Valley near Turin, Piedmont.

The specific gravity is 3.4 and the Mohs hardness is 6 1/2. The name "vesuvianite" was given by Abraham Gottlob Werner in 1795, because fine crystals of the mineral are found at Vesuvius; these are brown in color and occur in the ejected limestone blocks of Monte Somma. Several other names were applied to this species, one of which, "idocrase" by René Just Haüy in 1796, is now in common use.

A sky bluish variety known as cyprine has been reported from Franklin, New Jersey and other locations; the blue is due to impurities of copper in a complex calcium aluminum sorosilicate. Californite is a name sometimes used for jade-like vesuvianite, also known as California jade, American jade or Vesuvianite jade. Xanthite is a manganese rich variety. Wiluite is an optically positive variety from Wilui, Siberia. Idocrase is an older synonym sometimes used for gemstone-quality vesuvianite. Also, Vessonite and Vassolite are variant spellings commonly encountered in the gem trade.

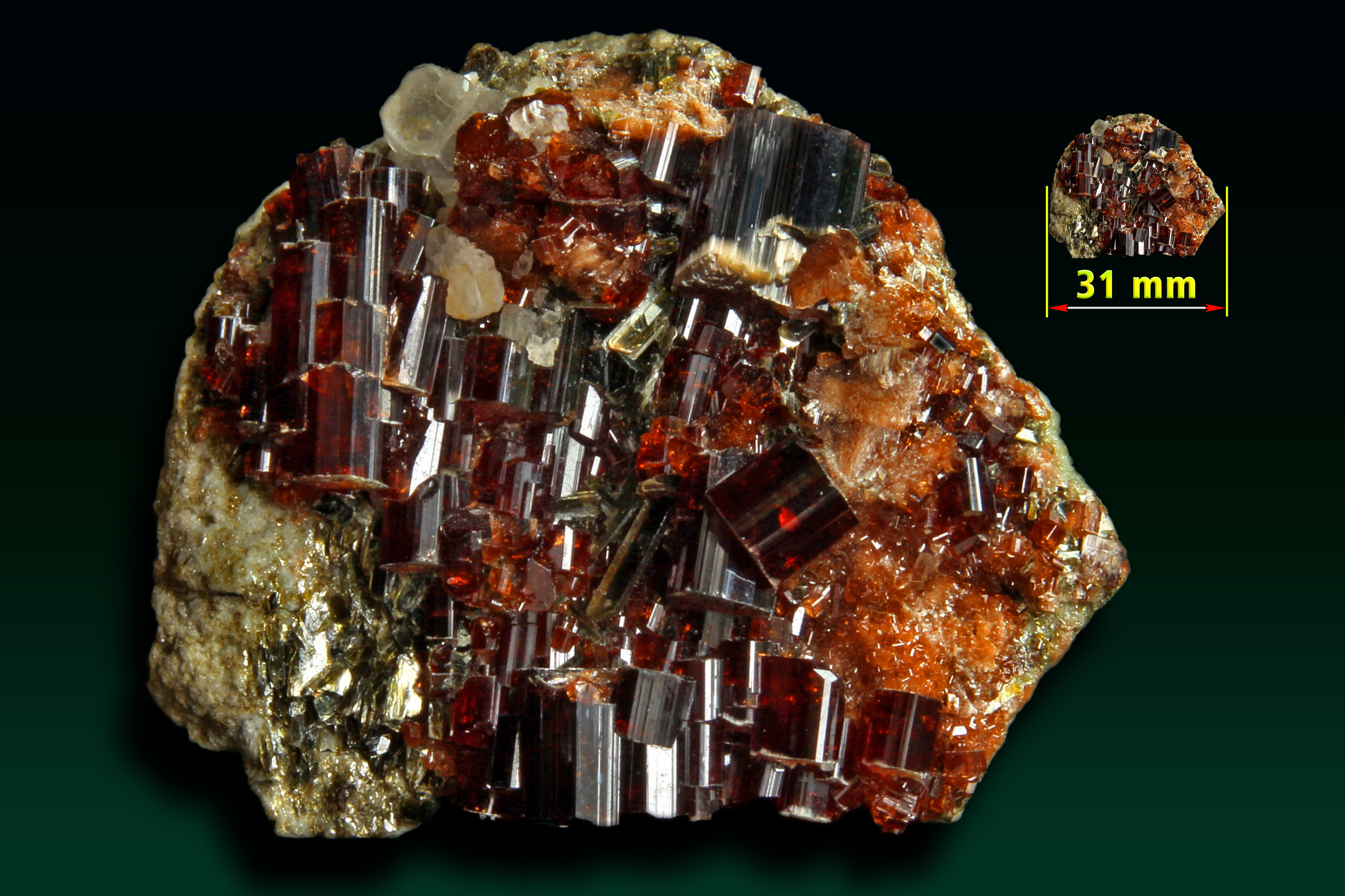
Vesuvianite – Alchuri, Shigar Valley, Gilgit-Baltistan, Pakistan.

== Additional sources ==
- Deere, W. A.; et al. (1962). Rock Forming Minerals. Vol. 1. pp. 113–120.
- Webmineral data
- Vesuvianite at Franklin-Sterling
- Mindat – Cyprine variants with location data
