= Henry Hudson Barton =

British-American Industrialist (1830–1905)

- Born: 1830; England
- Died: March 20, 1905; Philadelphia, Pennsylvania, U.S.
- Occupation: Mineralogist
- Known for: Founding Barton International

Henry Hudson Barton (1830–1905) was an English-born entrepreneur and industrialist who pioneered the use of Garnet as an abrasive. Born in England to Daniel and Hannah Barton, he immigrated to Boston in 1846, where he apprenticed with a jeweler and in the 1850s learned of a large deposit of Adirondack garnet in Gore Mountain (New York).

After moving to Philadelphia, he married into a sandpaper manufacturing family and began experimenting with pulverized and graded garnet, producing the first garnet-coated abrasives, which quickly proved superior to existing products.

In 1878, Barton began mining at Gore Mountain, and by 1887 had purchased the entire mountain from the State of New York. Early operations were entirely manual, with garnet hauled down to North Creek for shipment to his Philadelphia plant. A processing facility was later built at the mine, where crushing, milling, and coarse grading were carried out. The Gore Mountain site operated until 1983, when mining shifted to nearby Ruby Mountain, where operations continue today. Barton died in Philadelphia on March 20, 1905.

== See also ==
- Sandpaper
- Abrasives
