= Rhodolite =

Rose-colored gemstone of the garnet group

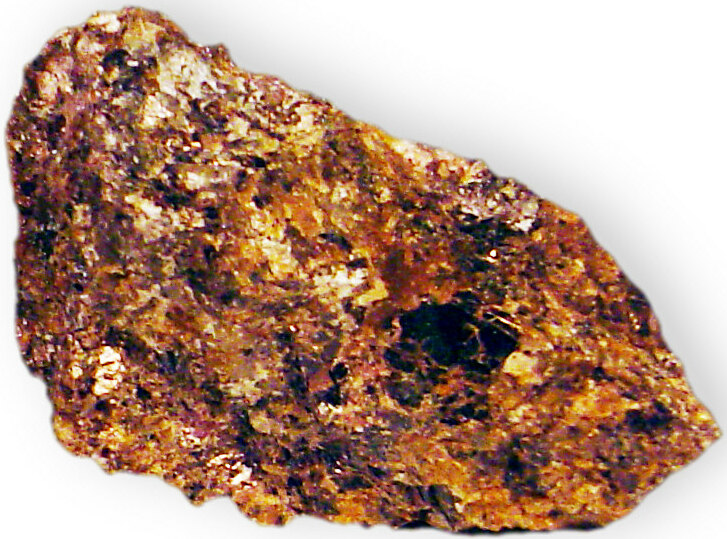

General
- Category: Pyrope variety, nesosilicate
- Formula: (Mg,Fe)_{3}Al_{2}(SiO_{4})_{3}
- Crystal system: Cubic

Identification
- Color: light to dark purplish red through reddish purple
- Cleavage: none, may show indistinct parting
- Fracture: conchoidal
- Mohs scale hardness: 7.0–7.5
- Luster: greasy to vitreous
- Specific gravity: 3.84±0.10
- Polish luster: vitreous
- Optical properties: Single refractive, often anomalous double refractive
- Refractive index: 1.760+0.010 −0.020
- Birefringence: none
- Pleochroism: none
- Dispersion: 0.026
- Ultraviolet fluorescence: inert
- Absorption spectra: usually at 504, 520, and 573 nm, may also have faint lines at 423, 460, 610, and 680–690 nm

Rhodolite is a varietal name for rose-pink to red mineral pyrope, a species in the garnet group. It was first described from Cowee Valley, Macon County, North Carolina. The name is derived from the Greek "rhodon" for "rose-like", in common with other pink mineral types (such as rhodochrosite, rhodonite). This coloration, and the commonly inclusion-free nature of garnet from this locality, has led to rhodolite being used as a gemstone. Rhodolite like other varietal names is not officially recognized as a mineralogical term, but rather used as an accepted trade name.

== Gemmological properties ==
Mineralogically and chemically, rhodolite garnets are members of the pyrope–almandine solid-solution series, with an approximate bulk garnet composition of Py_{70}Al_{30}.

Rhodolites from different occurrences around the world have been characterized by crystal chemical and absorption spectral analysis showing that besides iron such elements as manganese, chromium and vanadium may effect the colour of rhodolites.

Rhodolite garnets appear as transparent red-pink-purplish gemstones, including all the different colour shades between violet and red. The colors from different rhodolite sources may vary from a lavender pink to raspberry rose or raspberry red and from purplish-violet (grape) to purplish red.

The color of rhodolites, combined with their brilliance, durability, and the accessibility of stones with no visible inclusions have brought about some demand for the stone in the jewelry industry. Rhodolites used in jewelry are generally faceted to make good use of their brilliance, though they also exist in cabochon form.

Some rhodolites will change color from purplish to a hessonite brown when heated to a temperature of 600 °C (1,100 °F). This process cannot be reversed.

== Natural sources ==
Many deposits of economic importance are found in countries that belong to the geological unit of the so called “Mozambique belt”, such as Kenya, Madagascar, Malawi, Mozambique, Tanzania, etc. Other sources of rhodolites are in Brazil, India (Odisha), Norway, United States and Sri Lanka.
