= Gore Mountain Garnet =

Rock formation in New York

- Type: Geologic Formation

Lithology
- Primary: Garnet Amphibolite

Location
- Region: Adirondack Mountains
- Country: United States
- Extent: New York

Type section
- Named for: Gore Mountain
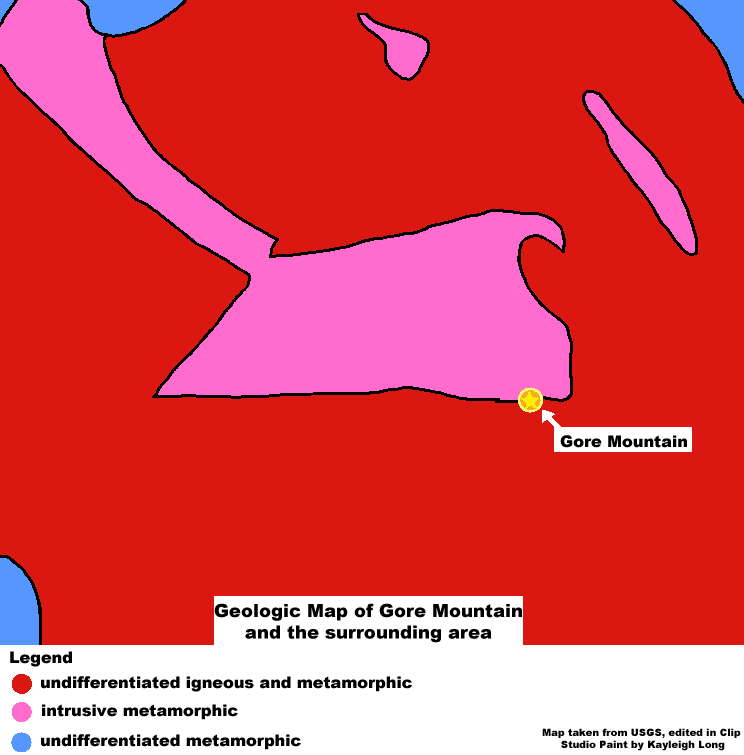
- Geologic Map of Gore Mountain and the surrounding area.

Gore Mountain Garnet, found in the Adirondack Mountains in New York, contains the world's largest garnets. The rock that holds these garnets, garnet amphibolite, is sometimes referred to as 'black ore' or 'dark ore.' This rock formation formed during metamorphism during the Ottawan phase of the Grenvillian orogeny, and extremely high temperatures combined with introduction of fluids is what most likely contributed to the unusual size of the megacrystic garnets.

== Geography ==
The Gore Mountain Garnet outcrop is located in the south central Adirondack mountains in northern New York. The mountains themselves, which are part of the Canadian Grenville Province, are composed of three main parts, the first of which is a dome of anorthosite. This dome underlies a mantle of syenite gneiss, which in turn underlies a metasedimentary sequence of marble, quartzite, amphibolite, and other types of gneiss. The rock formation that Gore Mountain is famous for, the garnet amphibolite, is located 2600 ft up its northern slope. Said rock outcrop measures about 50 m by 600 m and trends east-west, grading into garnet-bearing meta-gabbro to the east. To the south of the garnet amphibolite is a fault that runs parallel to the contact line of a meta-syenite formation. The garnet amphibolite also borders the southern margin of an olivine meta-gabbro formation.

== Geological Overview ==
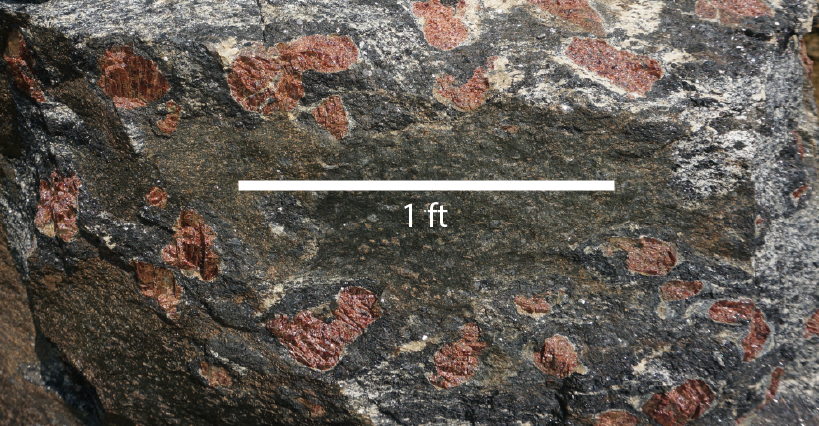
Outcrop of garnet amphibolite from Gore Mountain with scale.

The garnet amphibolite in Gore Mountain formed during the Ottawan Orogeny via metamorphism. Past studies suggested that the growth of garnets was aided by magma intrusion and partial melting, but that hypothesis has since been disproven by experiments. The abnormal size of the garnets is attributed to high temperatures and fluid flow introduced by faults.

== Metamorphism ==
The protolith is a spinel-clouded plagioclase metamorphosed gabbro (metagabbro). Metamorphism took place during the Ottawan phase of the Grenville orogeny, when crustal thickening was occurring. The peak temperature of metamorphism was notably high, being over 900 °C. Peak pressure was also quite high, ranging from 9-10 kbar. The metamorphosis of the protolith into garnet amphibolite is marked by orogenic folding and plastic flow, as well as a hydration phase. Garnet growth, introduction of fluid, retrograde metamorphism, and ductile deformation all occurred simultaneously. The fluid flow was likely channelized, as evidence from the large variability in trace elements. Fluid flow induced ion mobility and plasticity, as well as enriching the whole rock chemistry with lithium and thorium and depleting cesium.

Aside from the introduction of fluids, metamorphic transformation was isochemical as evidenced by the homogeneity of the garnets. Having all chemical constituents continuously available and constant pressure and temperature conditions during formation is most likely what allowed isochemical transformation and homogeneity in the garnets. The garnets underwent two growth phases and one reabsorption phase. The first growth phase was homogenous, while the second phase was marked by the enrichment of yttrium and titanium in the garnets. In the reabsorption phase, garnets partitioned yttrium but were depleted in titanium. Two periods of cooling occurred, a fast one (91 °C/Ma) and a slow one (26 °C/Ma). Advection dominated cooling happened during topography driven lower crustal flow, while conduction dominated cooling happened one flow stopped.

== Petrological description ==
The rock formation that bears the large garnets in Gore Mountain is an amphibolite that has been enriched in yttrium and lithium.

=== Mineralogy ===
Minerals in the garnet amphibolite include:

- Hornblende
- Plagioclase
- Garnet
- Biotite
- Orthopyroxene

There are some minor cases of sulfides, and there are no olivines.

The garnets in Gore Mountain are abnormally large, with the largest being 1 m in diameter. They have a hardness of 8-9 on the Mohs scale and an average density of 3.95 gm/cm^{3}.

The composition of the garnets are as follows:

- 43% pyrope
- 40% almandine
- 14% grossular
- 2% andradite
- 1% spessartine

=== Trace element geochemistry ===
The garnet amphibolite is strongly enriched in lithium and depleted in copper, cesium, thorium, and uranium.

Trends in the garnet amphibolite include:

- Hornblende and biotite growing bigger with the garnets
- Manganese concentrations increasing towards the outer rim of garnets due to reabsorption
- Enrichment of yttrium and titanium during garnet growth
- Depletion of titanium and enrichment of yttrium during garnet reabsorption
- Overall enrichment of lithium in the whole rock and overall depletion of copper, cesium, thorium, and uranium
- Green-spinel included plagioclase becoming white plagioclase with no inclusions.

== Structures ==
The garnets bear the inclusions in this rock unit, which range from minerals such as acicular rutile, pyrite, plagioclase, pyroxene, hornblende, ilmenite, apatite, and biotite. The most common of these is the acicular rutile. Also shown in the garnets is well-developed tectonic parting.

Viewing the garnet amphibolite as a whole, there is a fault to the south that runs parallel to the contact with a meta-syenite formation. Lineation in the garnet amphibolite is formed by the parallel alignment of hornblende, elongate mafic and felsic minerals, plagioclase pressure shadows, and few instances of elongate garnet.
