= Knorringite =

Mineral species belonging to the garnet group

General
- Category: garnet, nesosilicate
- Formula: Mg_{3}Cr_{2}(SiO_{4})_{3}
- IMA symbol: Krr
- Strunz classification: 9.AD.25
- Crystal system: Cubic
- Crystal class: Hexoctahedral (m3̅m); H-M symbol: (4/m 3̅ 2/m)
- Space group: Ia3̅d
- Unit cell: a = 11.59 Å; Z = 8

Identification
- Color: Bluish green
- Crystal habit: Massive and as minute grains
- Cleavage: None
- Mohs scale hardness: 6–7
- Luster: Vitreous
- Diaphaneity: Semitransparent
- Specific gravity: 3.756
- Optical properties: Isotropic
- Refractive index: n = 1.803

Knorringite is a mineral species belonging to the garnet group, and forms a series with the species pyrope. It was discovered in 1968 in the Kao kimberlite pipe in the Butha-Buthe District of Lesotho and is named after Oleg Von Knorring, a professor of mineralogy at the University of Leeds in England.

Synthetic knorringite has the pure endmember formula Mg_{3}Cr_{2}(SiO_{4})_{3}. As knorringite is a member of the knorringite–pyrope series, natural samples contain variable aluminium in the chromium site. Knorringite is a greenish blue color with a Mohs scale of mineral hardness of six to seven.

It occurs as a rare component within ultramafic nodules in kimberlites in association with olivine, enstatite, chrome diopside, chromian pyrope, chromian spinel, ilmenite, perovskite, zircon, diamond, omphacite, rutile, carbonates and micas. It has been reported from the Red Ledge mine in Nevada County, California in addition to the type location in Lesotho.

Knorringite is a tracer mineral in the search for diamonds in kimberlite pipes.
