= Goldmanite =

Mineral, nesosilicate garnet

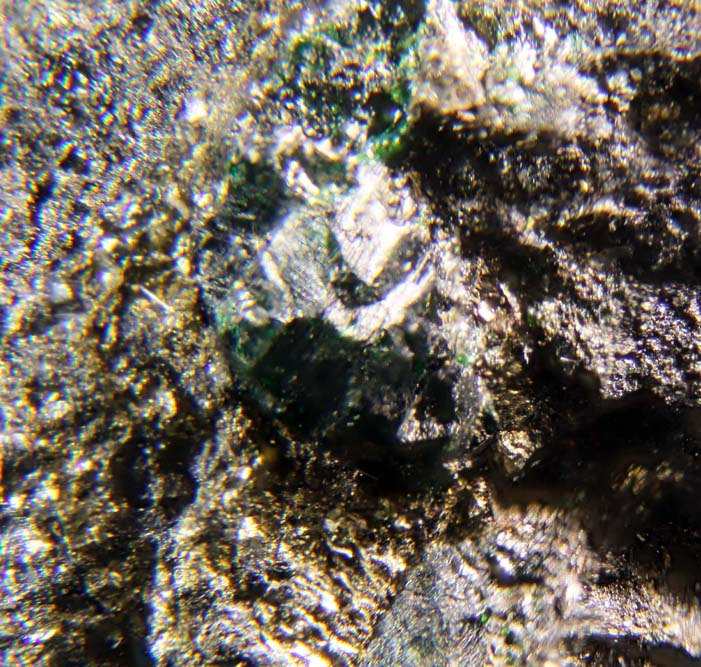
- Goldmanite from Slovakia

General
- Category: Nesosilicates, garnet
- Formula: Ca_{3}(V^{3+},Al,Fe^{3+})_{2}(SiO_{4})_{3}
- IMA symbol: Glm
- Strunz classification: 9.AD.25
- Dana classification: 51.4.3b.4
- Crystal system: Isometric
- Crystal class: Hexoctahedral (m3̅m); H-M symbol: (4/m 3̅ 2/m)
- Space group: Ia3̅d
- Unit cell: a = 12.01 Å V = 1,732.32 Å^{3}; Z = 8

Identification
- Color: Green, brownish–green
- Crystal habit: Dodecahedral crystals and anhedral grains
- Cleavage: None
- Mohs scale hardness: 6–7
- Luster: Vitreous
- Streak: White
- Diaphaneity: Transparent to sub-opaque
- Specific gravity: 3.74 – 3.77 (measured)
- Optical properties: Isotropic, may show weak anisotropism
- Refractive index: n = 1.821
- Common impurities: Cr, Mn, Mg

Goldmanite is a green or greenish-brown silicate mineral of the garnet group with a chemical formula of Ca_{3}(V^{3+},Al,Fe^{3+})_{2}(SiO_{4})_{3}.

== Discovery ==
It was first described in 1964 for an occurrence in the Laguna District, Cibola County, New Mexico and is named after Marcus Isaac Goldman (1881–1965), an American petrologist. The type locality, South Laguna (or Sandy) mine area, was in vanadium rich clay within a metamorphosed uranium-vanadium deposit in sandstone. While studying these deposits, it was noted that garnet in relatively unmineralized sandstone is colorless, whereas garnet in dark well-mineralized rock, containing abundant vanadium clay and uranium deposits was deep green or brownish green. To confirm the green color was due to vanadium, two samples of garnet were separated from dark ore, analyzed, and found to be rich in vanadium. The South Laguna mine area was studied in 1955 and 1956 as part of an investigation of the geology and uranium deposits of the Laguna district by the USGS.

== Occurrence ==
In addition to the type location in the Sandy mine in New Mexico, it has been reported from Coat-an-Noz, Cotes-du-Nord, France; in drill core from the North Sea; from Klatovy, Czech Republic; Ishimskaya Luka, northern Kazakhstan; the Slyudyanka complex, Sayan Mountains, near Lake Baikal region of Russia and the Yamoto mine, Kagoshima Prefecture, Japan. One of the world's biggest goldmanite deposits can be found in the Pezinok District, Slovakia. It is also found in the metalliferious black shales of the Korean Peninsula.

== Composition ==
Goldmanite is composed of calcium (24.79%), aluminium (3.34%), vanadium (12.6%), iron (2.3%), silicon (17.37%), and oxygen (39.59%). Its chemical formula is Ca_{3}(V^{3+},Al,Fe^{3+})_{2}(SiO_{4})_{3}.

== Properties ==
The approximate density (3.74±.03) of goldmanite was determined by finding the density of diluted Clerici solution in which small fragments remained suspended. Because of fine grain size, more accurate determination of density was not attempted. The calculated density (3.737) agrees with the approximate value. The index of refraction was found by immersion to be 1.821±.001, using sodium light and adjusting for small temperature changes. Like so many calcium garnets, goldmanite was found to be weakly anisotropic. The cell edge of goldmanite is 12.011 Å, as determined by x-ray powder diffraction analysis.
