= Gore Mountain (New York) =

Mountain in New York, United States

- Location within New York Location within the United States

Highest point
- Elevation: 3563+ ft (1086+ m)
- Prominence: 1,850 ft (560 m)
- Listing: New York County High Points 7th
- Coordinates: 43°40′35″N 74°02′06″W

Geography
- Location: North Creek, Warren County, New York, U.S.
- Parent range: Adirondack Mountains
- Topo map: USGS Thirteenth Lake

Gore Mountain is a mountain located near the village of North Creek in Warren County, New York, of which its peak is the highest point. Gore is flanked to the north by South Mountain, and to the southwest by Height of Land Mountain. The mountain is the site of the Gore Mountain ski resort, and the Gore Mountain Fire Observation Station which was built in 1918.

== History ==
Gore mountain gets its name from the word "gore", a tract of land, typically triangular, characteristically arising from survey lines that do not close. The mountain remained unsurveyed during early settlement of the Adirondack Mountain region because it was considered valueless to early farmers and loggers. It was considered too high and steep for farming and horse drawn logging. It remained a "gore" and the name stuck as Gore Mountain.

=== Fire tower ===
In August 1909, the first fire lookout tower was an 18-foot-tall (5.5 m) wooden tower constructed by the Forest, Fish and Game Commission. In 1918, the Civilian Conservation Corps replaced it with a 60-foot-tall (18 m) Aermotor LS40 tower. In October 1919, a hurricane caused the tower to fall down, as well as the tower on Hadley Mountain. The tower was rebuilt and was opened for the 1920 fire lookout season. The fire tower ceased fire lookout operations at the end of the 1988 season, and was officially closed in early 1989. The tower still remains but is closed to the public and is used as a communications relay tower.

== Watershed ==
Gore Mountain stands within the watershed of the Hudson River which drains into New York Harbor. The south end of Gore Mtn. drains into Black Mountain Brook, thence into Chatiemac Brook, North Creek, and the Hudson River. The southeast slopes of Gore Mtn. drains into Straight Brook, thence into North Creek. The northeast slopes of Gore Mtn. drains into Roaring Brook, thence into North Creek. The north west and west slopes of Gore Mtn. drain into the headwaters of the East Branch of the Sacandaga River, thence into Hudson River.

== Garnet mining ==
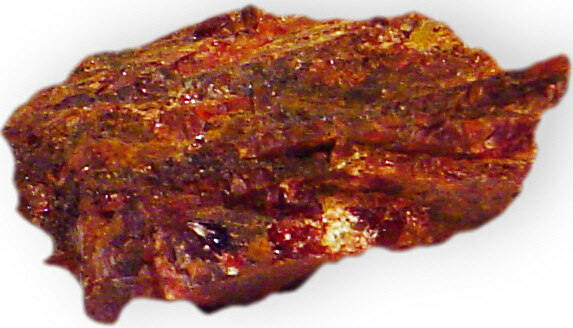
Garnet (pyrope) aggregate from the Barton mines

In 1878, Henry Hudson Barton began mining garnet at Gore Mountain for use as sandpaper abrasives, later purchasing the mountain and founding Barton Mines. The company relocated its mining operation to nearby Ruby Mountain in 1982. The mine operated until the early 1980s. The rock that contains these garnets, referred to as the Gore Mountain Garnet unit, is a garnet amphibolite. The largest garnet crystals in the world are found at Gore Mountain, ranging from 30 centimetres (12 in) to 1 metre (3 ft 3 in) in diameter.

== See also ==
- List of mountains in New York
