= Palenzonaite =

Rare vanadinate mineral

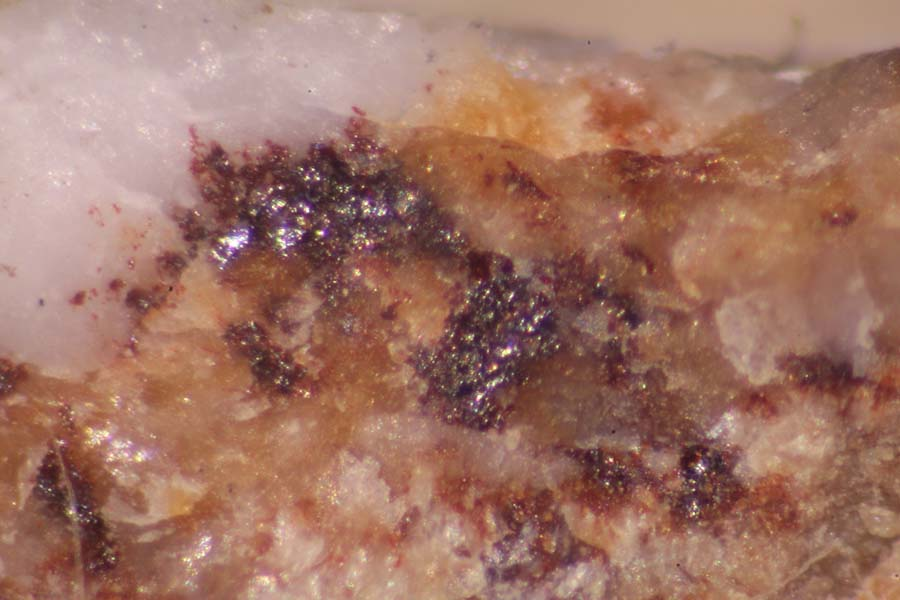

General
- Category: Vanadate minerals, garnet supergroup, berzeliite group
- Formula: (NaCa_{2})Mn^{2+}_{2}(VO_{4})_{3}
- IMA symbol: Plz
- Strunz classification: 8.AC.25
- Crystal system: Isometric
- Crystal class: m3m (4/m 3 2/m) - Hexoctahedral
- Space group: Ia3d (space group 230)
- Unit cell: 1,969.11 Å^{3}

Identification
- Colour: Dark red
- Cleavage: None observed
- Fracture: Irregular/uneven, sub-conchoidal
- Tenacity: Brittle
- Mohs scale hardness: 5 - 5½
- Luster: Adamantine, sub-adamantine, greasy
- Streak: Brownish red
- Specific gravity: 3.63
- Density: 3.63 g/cm3 (Measured) 3.78 g/cm^{3} (Calculated)
- Refractive index: n = 1.965
- Birefringence: Isotropic minerals have no birefringence
- Pleochroism: Non-pleochroic
- Ultraviolet fluorescence: Not fluorescent
- Solubility: Soluble in strong acids
- Alters to: 32 : Ba/Mn/Pb/Zn deposits, including metamorphic deposits

Palenzonaite is a rare vanadate mineral which is a member of the berzeliite group and is related to garnet. It was discovered in 1987 by Andrea Palenzona, Professor of Chemistry at the University of Genoa. He discovered palenzonaite at Molinello mine in Val Graveglia, Liguria Italy.

Palenzonaite is part of a small mineral family (with schaferite, berzeliite, manganberzeliite). The (As,V,P,Si)O_{4} tetrahedra in these garnets are isolated, not polymerized chains or sheets. Their mean Z–O distance follows the expected trend with ionic radius (shorter for Si^{4+}, longer for As^{5+}/V^{5+}). Palenzonaite shows up as a rare secondary mineral in Mn-rich, low-grade metamorphic deposits.

== See also ==
- List of minerals recognized by the International Mineralogical Association
