= Calderite =

Mineral in the garnet group

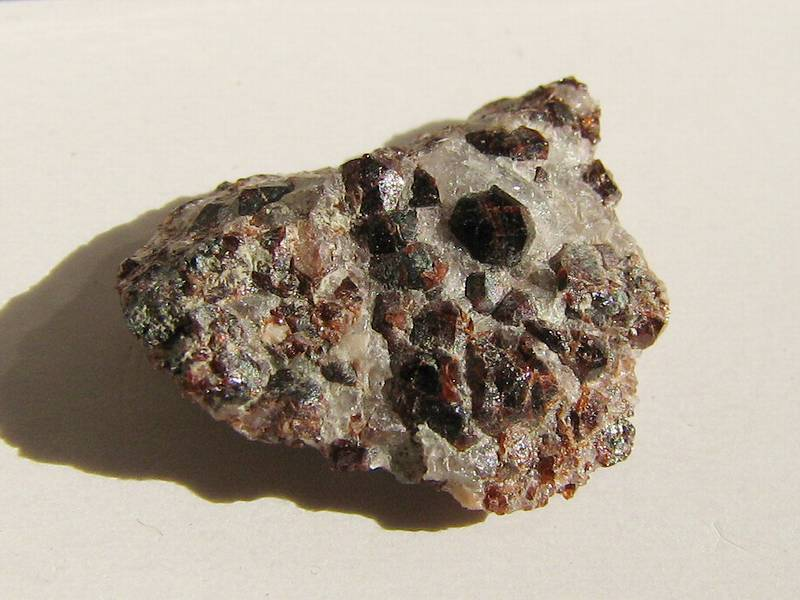
- Calderite crystals on matrix from Sunndal Municipality Norway

General
- Category: Silicate mineral
- Formula: (Mn^{2+}Ca)_{3}(Fe^{3+}Al)_{2}(SiO_{4})_{3}
- IMA symbol: Cdr
- Strunz classification: 9.AD.25 (10 ed); 8/A.08–40 (8 ed)
- Dana classification: 51.4.3a.6
- Crystal system: Cubic
- Crystal class: Hexoctahedral (m3̅m); H-M symbol: (4/m 3̅ 2/m)
- Space group: Ia3̅d
- Unit cell: a = 11.819 Å; Z = 8

Identification
- Color: brownish red to brownish yellow
- Cleavage: None
- Mohs scale hardness: 6.5–7.5
- Luster: Vitreous
- Streak: white
- Diaphaneity: transparent to translucent
- Specific gravity: 3.756
- Optical properties: Isotropic
- Refractive index: n = 1.872

Calderite is a mineral in the garnet group with the chemical formula (Mn^{2+}, Ca)_{3}(Fe^{3+}, Al)_{2}(SiO_{4})_{3}.

It is dark reddish brown to dark yellowish in color and generally granular massive in form.

It was named for geologist James Calder who worked on the geology of India. The name was first applied to a rock in manganese deposits in Katkamsandi, Hazaribagh district, Bihar and at Netra, Balaghat district, Madhya Pradesh, India. later transferred to its predominant mineral. In 1909 it was described as a mineral from Otjosondu, Otjozondjupa Region, Namibia.
