= Spessartine =

Nesosilicate, manganese aluminium garnet species

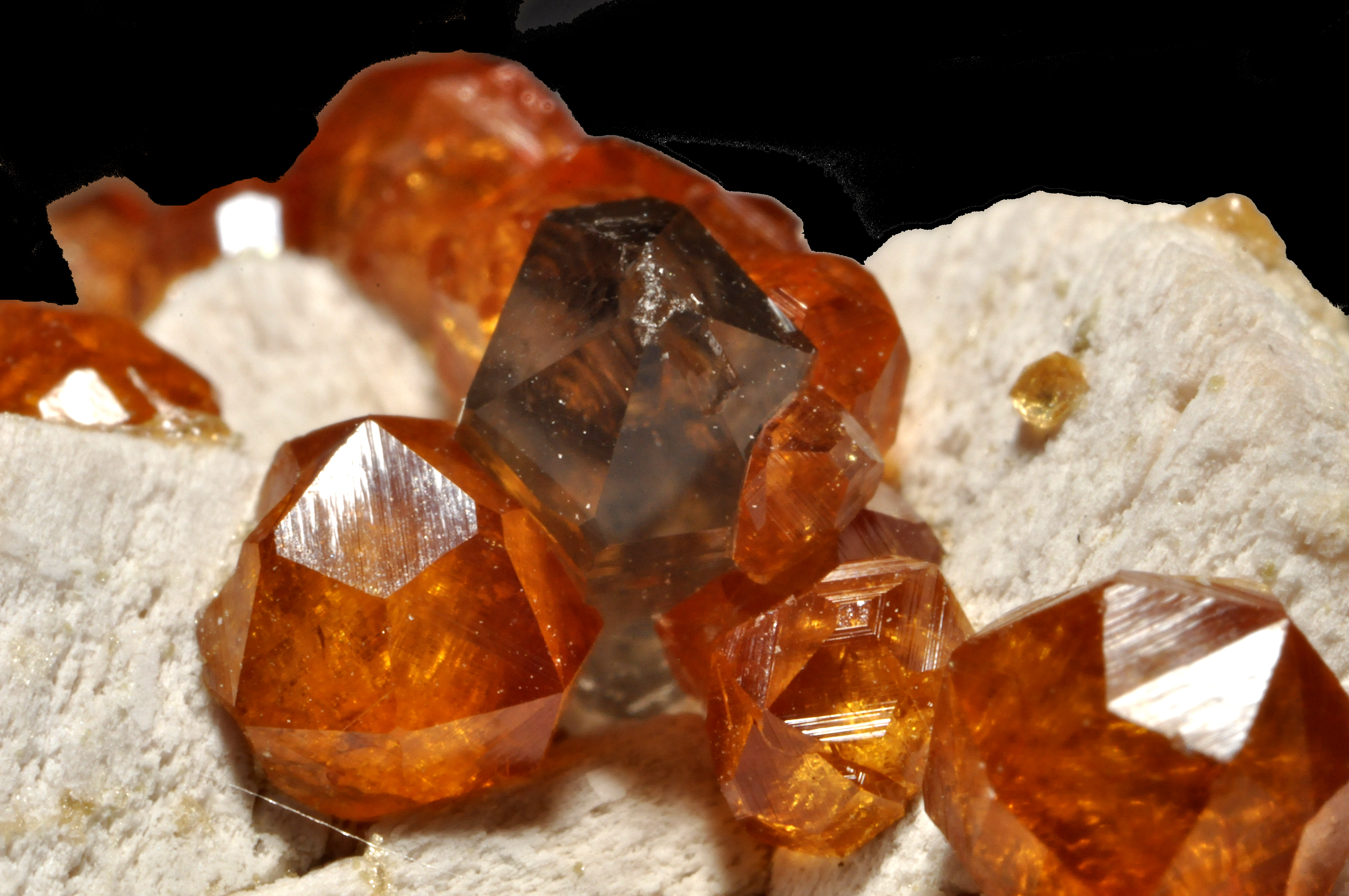
- Spessartine crystals

General
- Category: Nesosilicate; Garnet group
- Formula: Mn^{2+}_{3}Al_{2}(SiO_{4})_{3}
- IMA symbol: Sps
- Strunz classification: 9.AD.25
- Crystal system: Isometric
- Crystal class: Hexoctahedral (m3̅m); H-M symbol: (4/m 3̅ 2/m)
- Space group: Ia3d
- Unit cell: a = 11.63 Å; Z = 8

Identification
- Color: Yellow through red
- Crystal habit: Massive to crystalline
- Cleavage: None
- Fracture: Sub-conchoidal
- Tenacity: Brittle
- Mohs scale hardness: 6.5 – 7.5
- Luster: Vitreous
- Streak: White
- Diaphaneity: Transparent to translucent
- Specific gravity: 4.19 calculated, 4.12 – 4.32 measured
- Optical properties: Isotropic, often anomalous double refractive
- Refractive index: 1.800
- Birefringence: none
- Dispersion: Weak
- Absorption spectra: Bands at 410, 420, 430 nm (or merging to form cutoff below 430 nm; also bands at 460, 480, 520 nm. Possible weak bands at 504 or 573 nm

Spessartine is a nesosilicate, manganese aluminium garnet species, Mn^{2+}_{3}Al_{2}(SiO_{4})_{3}. This mineral is sometimes mistakenly referred to as spessartite.

Spessartine's name is a derivative of Spessart in Bavaria, Germany, the type locality of the mineral. It occurs most often in granite pegmatite and allied rock types and in certain low-grade metamorphic phyllites. Sources include Australia, Myanmar, India, Afghanistan, Israel, Madagascar, Namibia, Nigeria, Mozambique, Tanzania and the United States. Spessartine of an orange-yellow has been called Mandarin garnet and is found in Madagascar. Violet-red spessartines are found in rhyolites in Colorado and Maine. In Madagascar, spessartines are exploited either in their bedrock or in alluvium. The orange garnets result from sodium-rich pegmatites. Spessartines are found in bedrock in the highlands in the Sahatany valley. Those in alluvium are generally found in southern Madagascar or in the Maevatanana region.

Spessartine forms a solid solution series with the garnet species almandine. Well-formed crystals from this series, varying in color from very dark-red to bright yellow-orange, were found in Latinka, Rhodope Mountains, Kardzhali Province, Bulgaria. Spessartine, like the other garnets, always occurs as a blend with other species. Gems with high spessartine content tend toward a light orange hue, while almandine prevalence induces red or brownish hues.

== Images ==
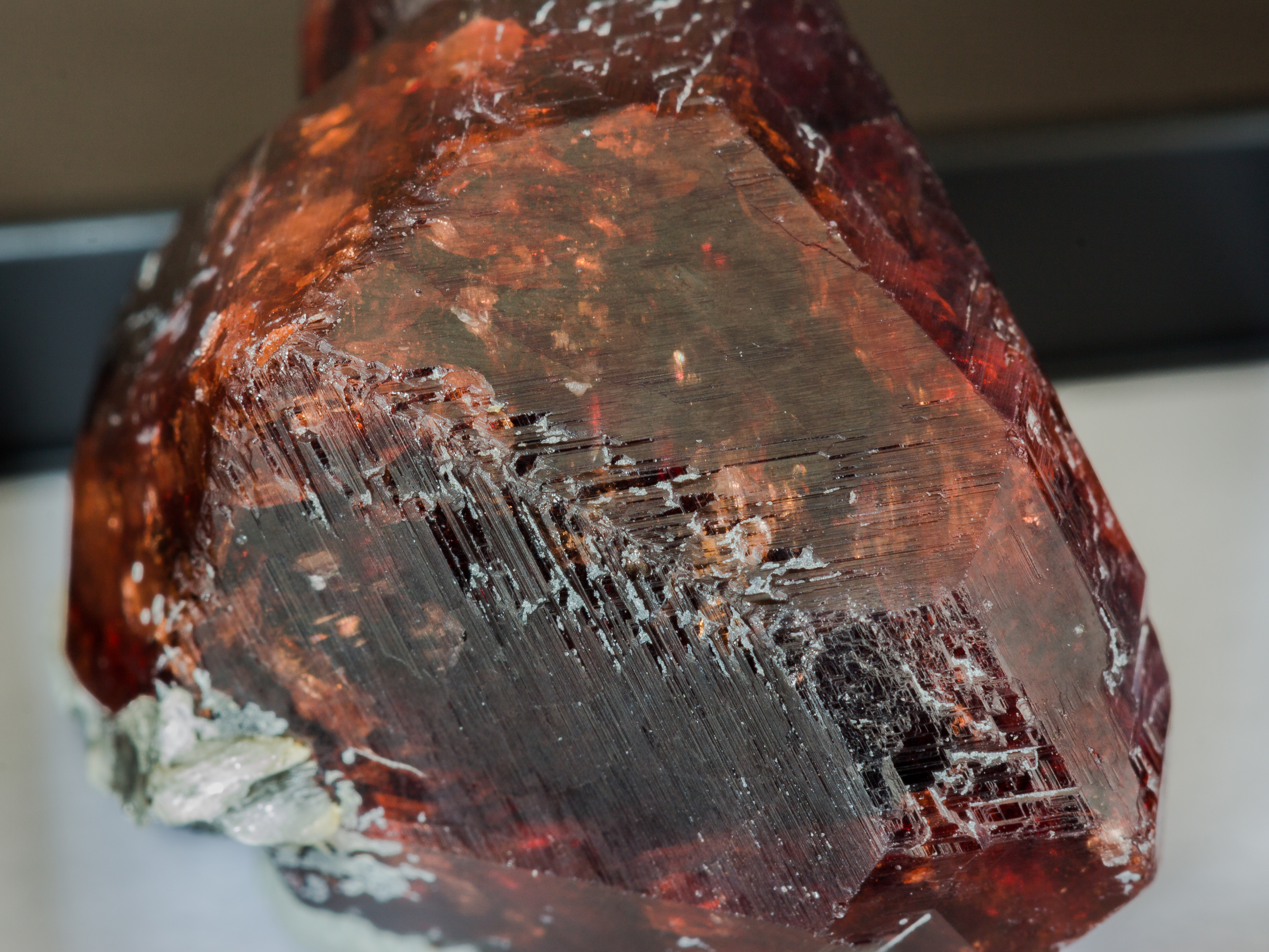
Spessartine crystal – Pakistan

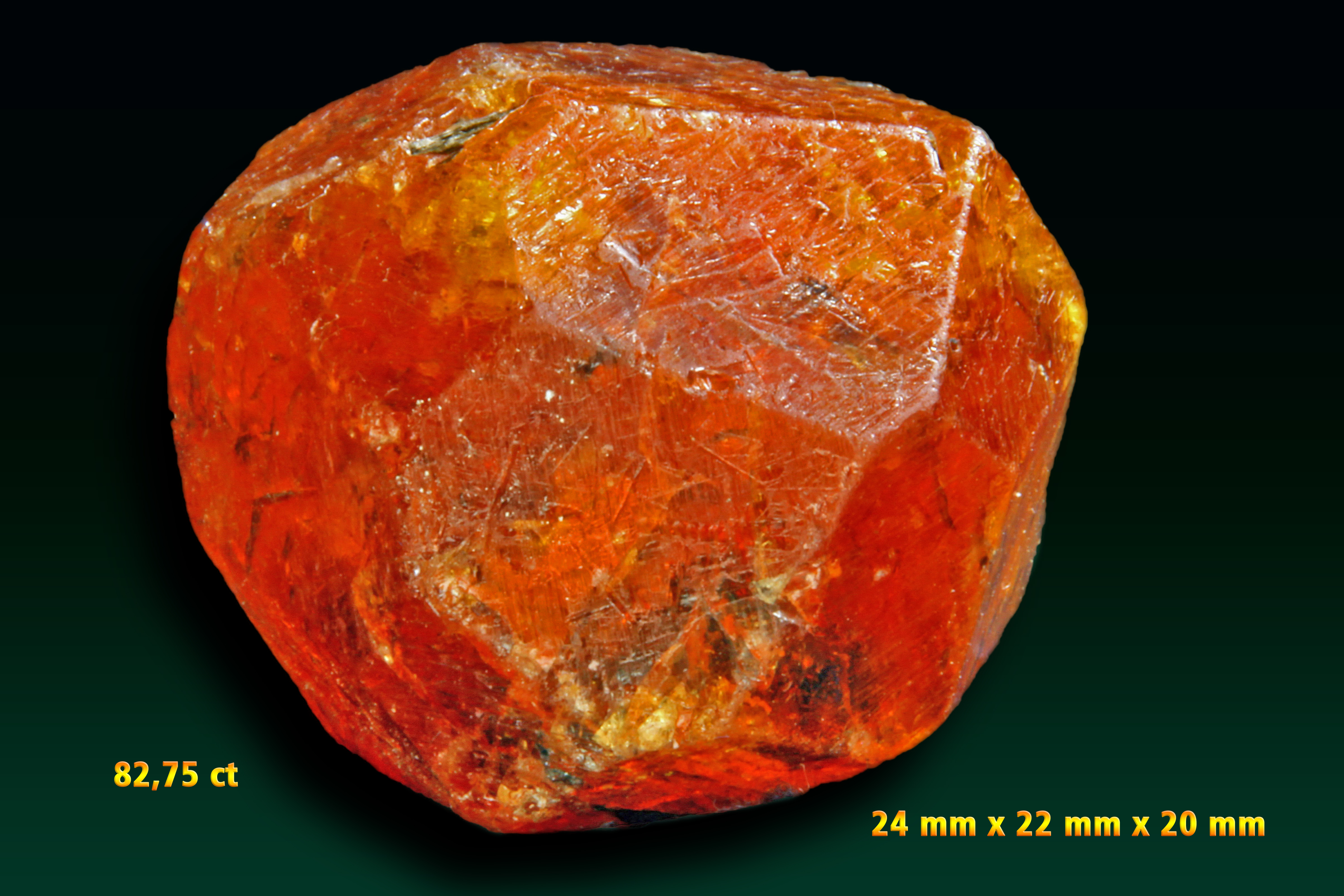
Garnet spessartine – Nani, Loliondo, Ngorongoro, Arusha Region, Tanzania

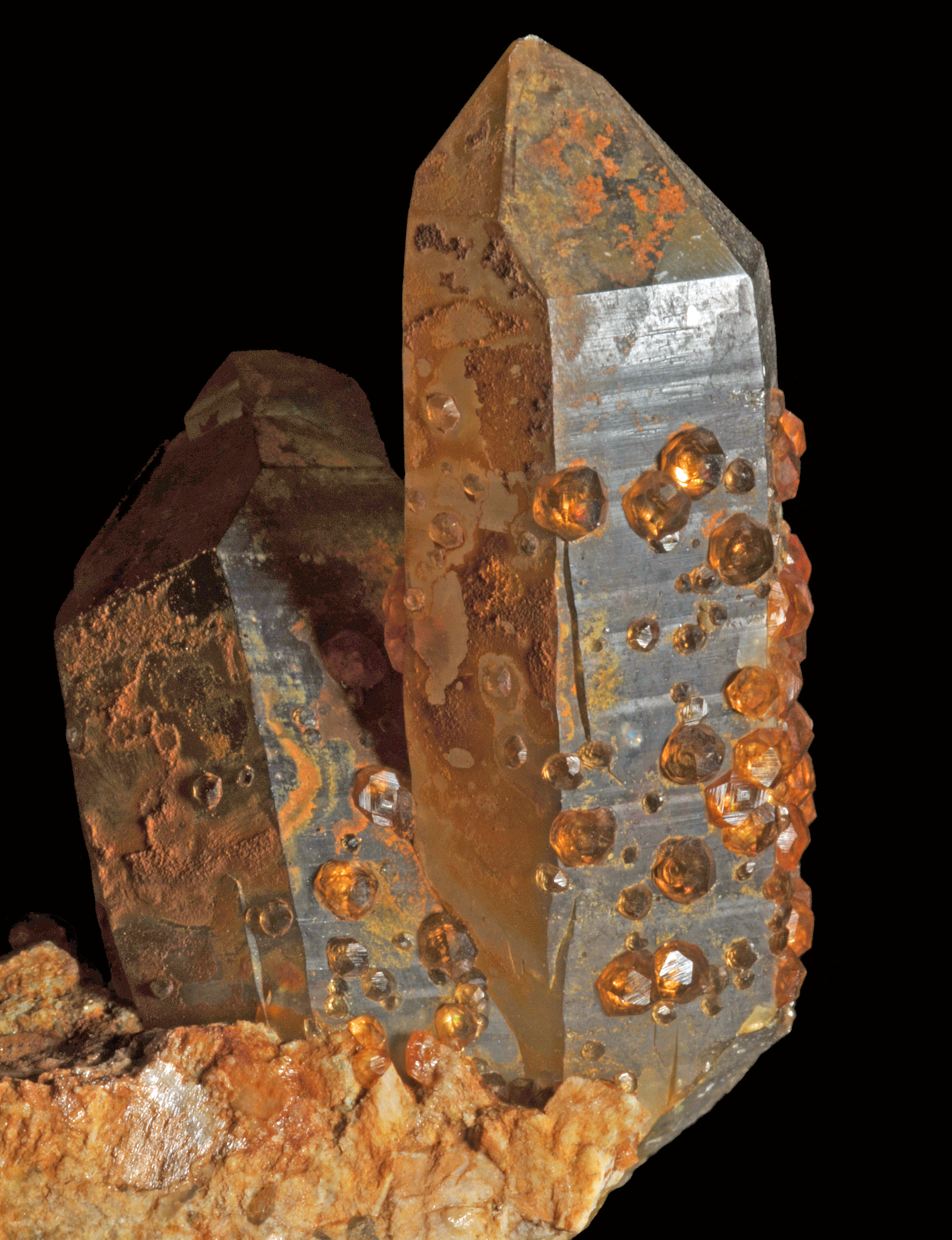
Spessartine on smoky quartz – Wushan Spessartine Mine, Tongbei, Fujian, China

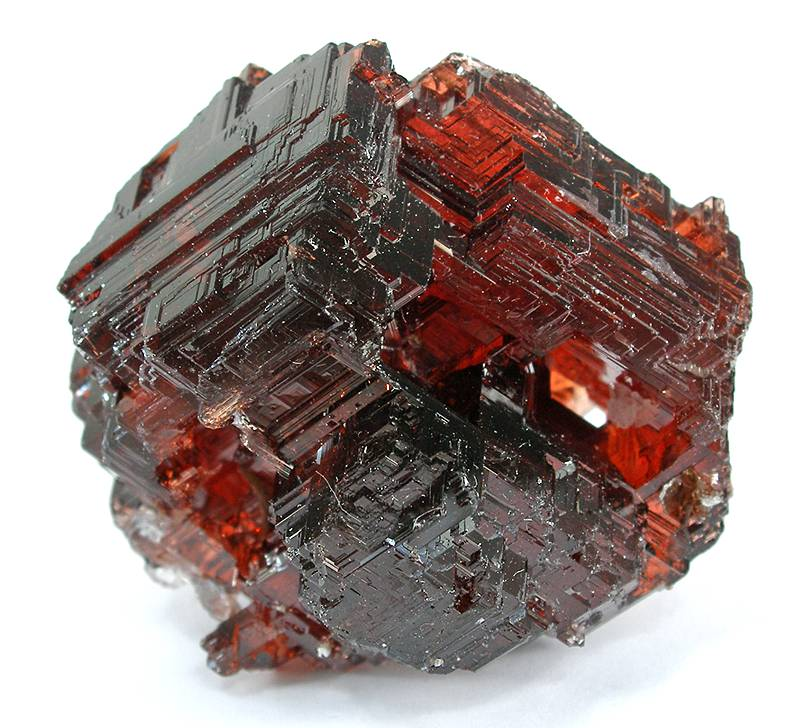
Reddish-orange spessartine – Navegadora Mine, Minas Gerais, Brazil

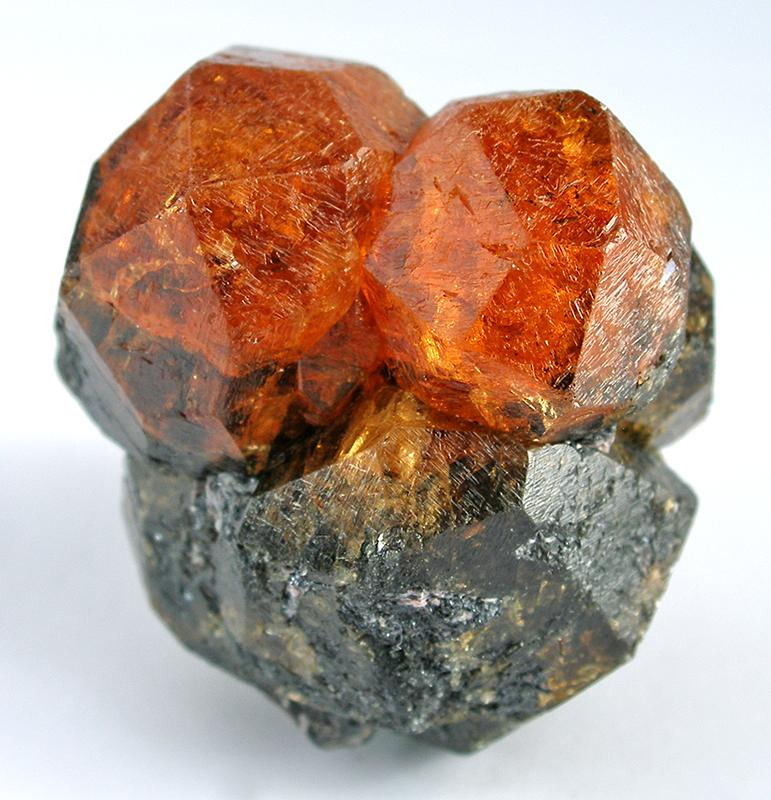
Two "frog-eyes" of 1.8 cm each perched atop a matrix

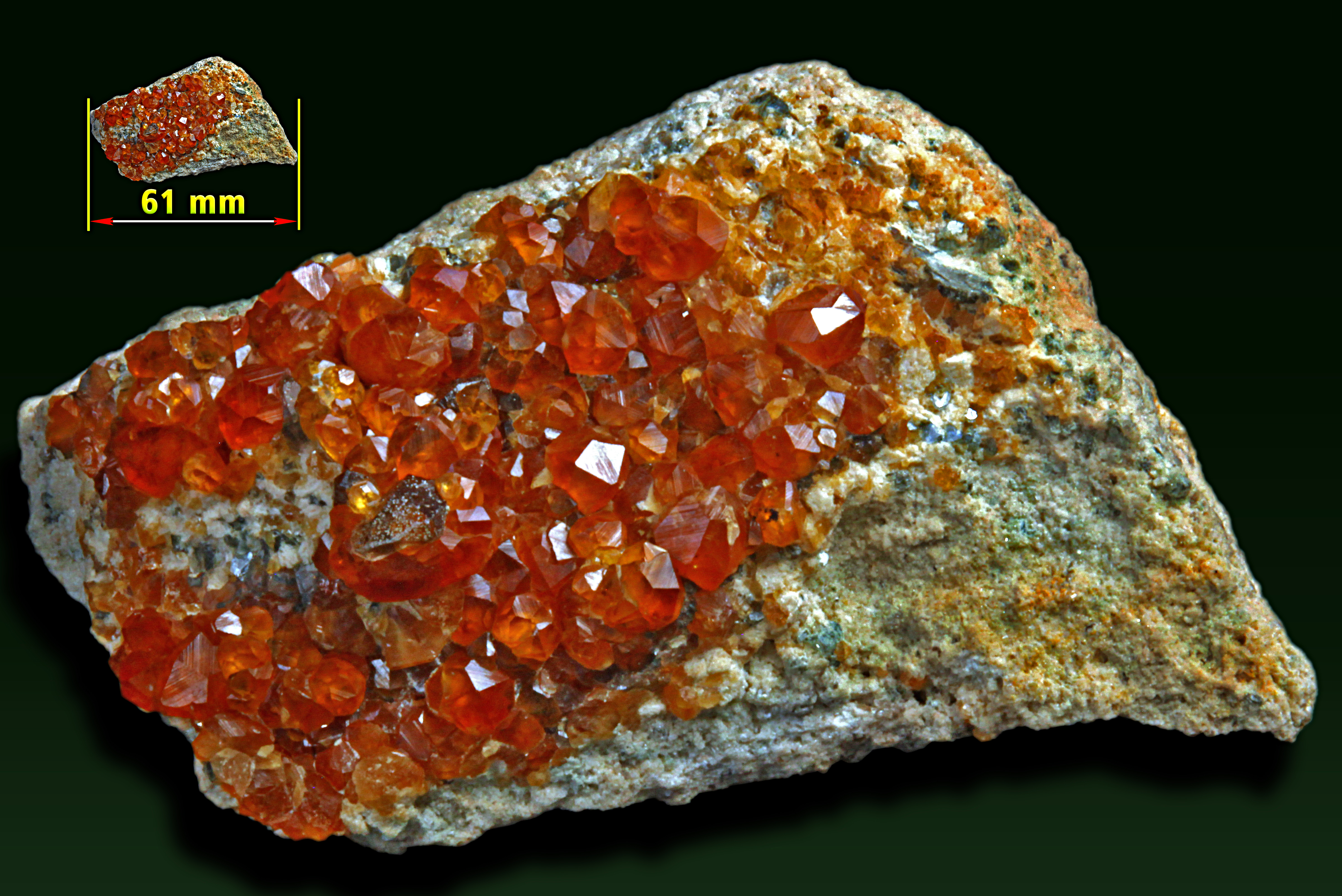
Spessartine garnet on feldspar – Tongbei Yun-xiao, Fujian, China.

== See also ==
- Andradite
- Gemstone
- Grossular
- Mineral collecting
- Pyrope
- Tsavorite
- Uvarovite
