= Schäferite =

Rare vanadate mineral

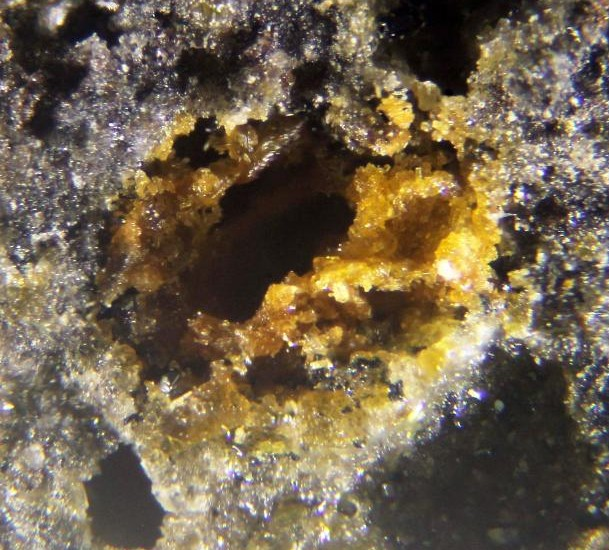
- Orange micro crystals of Schäferite

General
- Category: Phosphate mineral Berzeliite group Garnet structural group
- Formula: Ca_{2}NaMg_{2}[VO_{4}]_{3}
- IMA symbol: Sfr
- Strunz classification: 8.AC.25
- Crystal system: Cubic
- Crystal class: Hexoctahedral (m3̅m); H-M symbol: (4/m 3̅ 2/m)
- Space group: Ia3d
- Unit cell: a = 12.427 Å, Z = 8

Identification
- Formula mass: 496.57 g/mol
- Color: Red, orange-red
- Crystal habit: Octahedral crystals
- Cleavage: None
- Fracture: Conchoidal
- Mohs scale hardness: 5
- Luster: Vitreous
- Streak: Yellow
- Diaphaneity: Transparent
- Optical properties: Isotropic
- Refractive index: n = 1.96

Schäferite is a rare vanadate mineral with chemical formula Ca_{2}NaMg_{2}[VO_{4}]_{3}. Schäferite is isometric, which means that it has three axes of equal length and 90° angles between the axes. Schäferite is isotropic, meaning that the velocity of light is the same no matter which direction the light passes through.

It was named after Helmut Schäfer (born 1931) who discovered it in a quarry on the Bellerberg Volcano in Germany. It is found only in the Eifel Mountains volcanic area near Mayen, Laacher See district of Germany. It occurs within a xenolith in a leucite tephrite. It is the magnesium analogue of palenzonaite and is a member of the garnet structural group.
