= Garnet =

Mineral, semi-precious stone

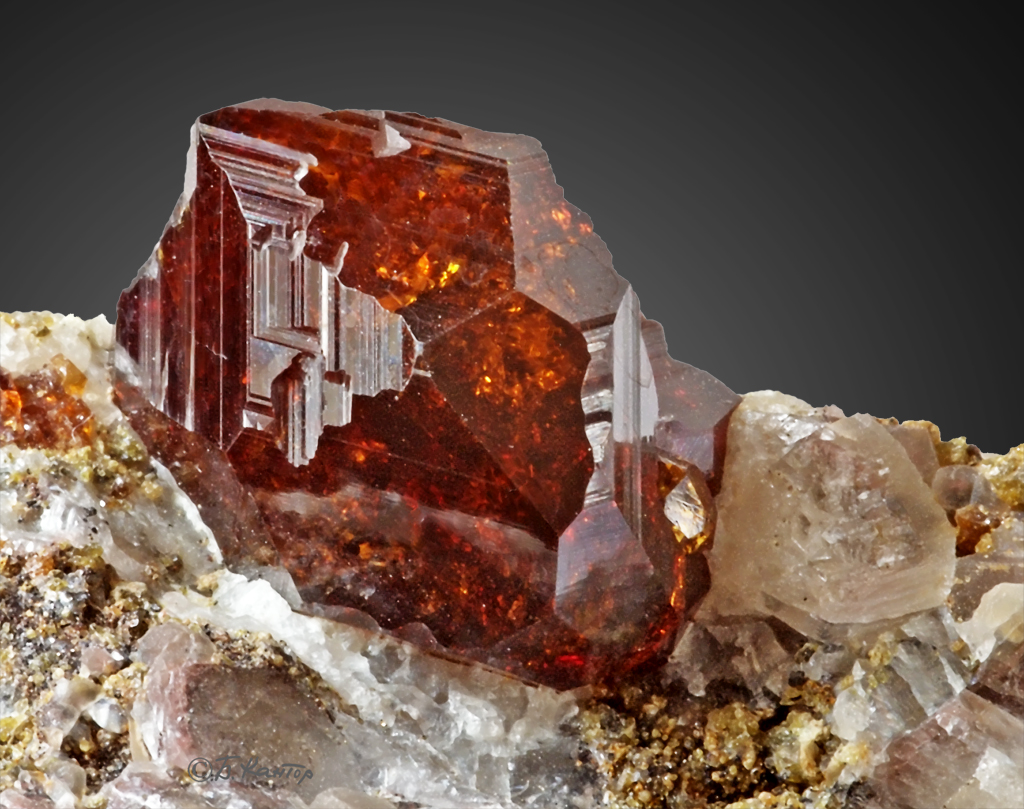

General
- Category: Nesosilicate
- Formula: The general formula X_{3}Y_{2}(SiO_{4})_{3}
- IMA symbol: Grt
- Crystal system: Isometric
- Crystal class: $4/m\bar{3} 2/m$
- Space group: Ia-3d

Identification
- Color: virtually all colors, blue is rare
- Crystal habit: Rhombic dodecahedron or cubic
- Cleavage: Indistinct
- Fracture: conchoidal to uneven
- Mohs scale hardness: 6.5–7.5
- Luster: vitreous to resinous
- Streak: White
- Diaphaneity: Can form with any diaphaneity, translucent is common
- Specific gravity: 3.1–4.3
- Polish luster: vitreous to subadamantine
- Optical properties: Single refractive, often anomalous double refractive
- Refractive index: 1.72–1.94
- Birefringence: None
- Pleochroism: None
- Ultraviolet fluorescence: variable
- Other characteristics: variable magnetic attraction

Major varieties
- Pyrope: Mg_{3}Al_{2}Si_{3}O_{12}
- Almandine: Fe_{3}Al_{2}Si_{3}O_{12}
- Spessartine: Mn_{3}Al_{2}Si_{3}O_{12}
- Andradite: Ca_{3}Fe_{2}Si_{3}O_{12}
- Grossular: Ca_{3}Al_{2}Si_{3}O_{12}
- Uvarovite: Ca_{3}Cr_{2}Si_{3}O_{12}

Garnets ( /ˈɡɑːrnɪt/) are a group of silicate minerals that have been used since the Bronze Age as gemstones and abrasives.

Garnet minerals, while sharing similar physical and crystallographic properties, exhibit a wide range of chemical compositions, defining distinct species. These species fall into two primary solid solution series: the pyralspite series (pyrope, almandine, spessartine), with the general formula [Mg,Fe,Mn]_{3}Al_{2}(SiO_{4})_{3}; and the ugrandite series (uvarovite, grossular, andradite), with the general formula Ca_{3}[Cr,Al,Fe]_{2}(SiO_{4})_{3}. Notable varieties of grossular include hessonite and tsavorite.

Although garnets are often associated with metamorphism, they can also occur in volcanic rocks on rare occasions.

== Etymology ==
The word "garnet" comes from the 14th-century Middle English word gernet, meaning dark red. It is borrowed from Old French grenate from Latin granatus, from granum (grain, seed). This is possibly a reference to mela granatum or even pomum granatum ('pomegranate', Punica granatum), a plant whose fruits contain abundant and vivid red seed covers (arils), which are similar in shape, size, and color to some garnet crystals. Hessonite garnet is also named gomed in Indian literature and is one of the nine jewels in Vedic astrology that comprise the Navaratna.

== Physical properties ==
=== Properties ===
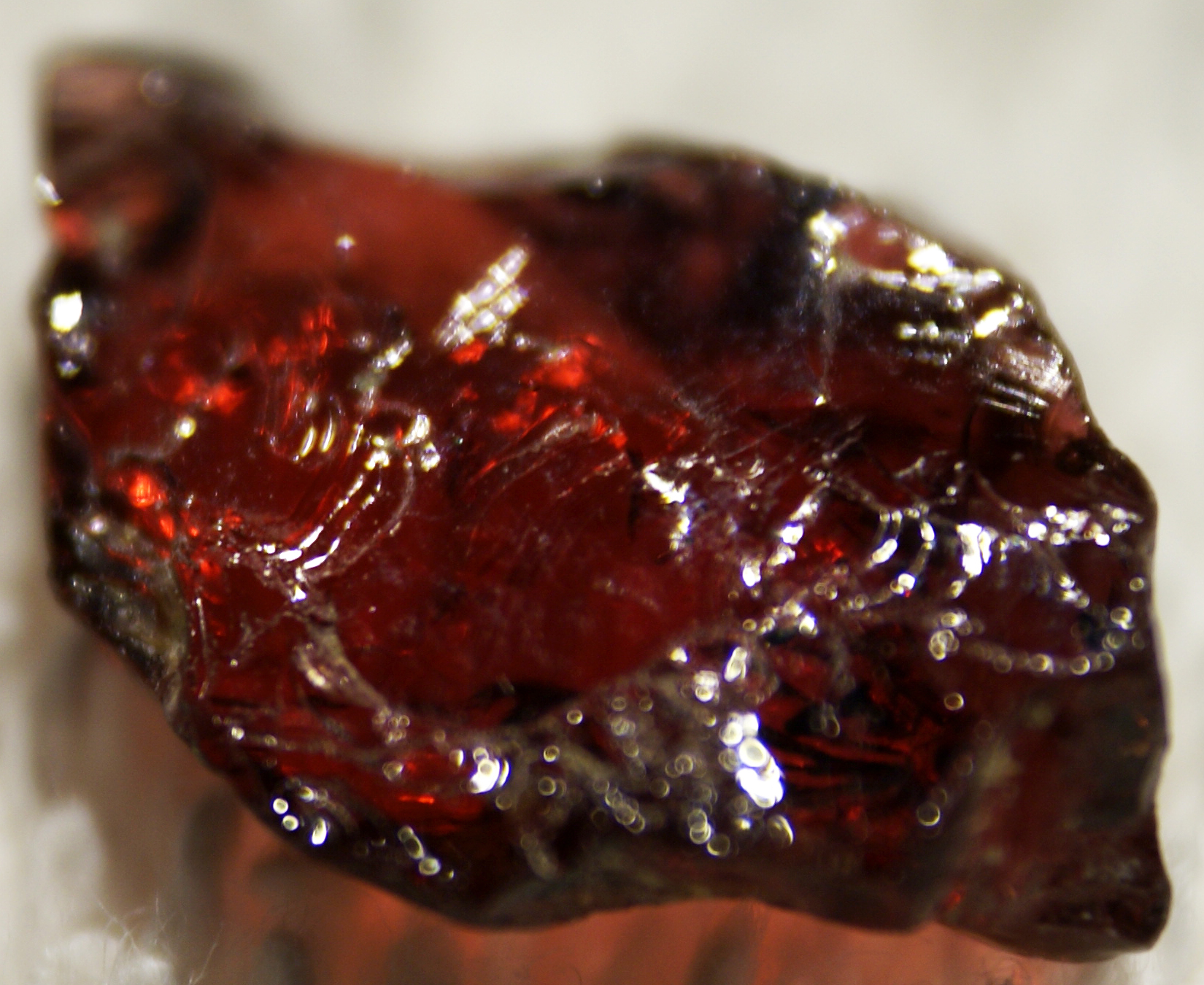
A sample showing the deep red color garnet can exhibit.

Garnet species are found in every color, with reddish shades most common. Blue garnets are the rarest and were first reported in the 1990s.

Garnet species' light transmission properties can range from the gemstone-quality transparent specimens to the opaque varieties used for industrial purposes as abrasives. The mineral's lustre is categorized as vitreous (glass-like) or resinous (amber-like).

=== Crystal structure ===
Garnets are nesosilicates having the general formula X_{3}Y_{2}(SiO_{4})_{3}. The X site is usually occupied by divalent cations (Ca, Mg, Fe, Mn)^{2+} and the Y site by trivalent cations (Al, Fe, Cr)^{3+} in an octahedral/tetrahedral framework with [SiO_{4}]^{4−} occupying the tetrahedra. Garnets are most often found in the dodecahedral crystal habit, but are also commonly found in the trapezohedron habit as well as the hexoctahedral habit. They crystallize in the cubic system, having three axes that are all of equal length and perpendicular to one another but are never actually cubic because, despite being isometric, the {100} and {111} families of planes are depleted. Garnets do not have any cleavage planes, so when they fracture under stress, sharp, irregular (conchoidal) pieces are formed.

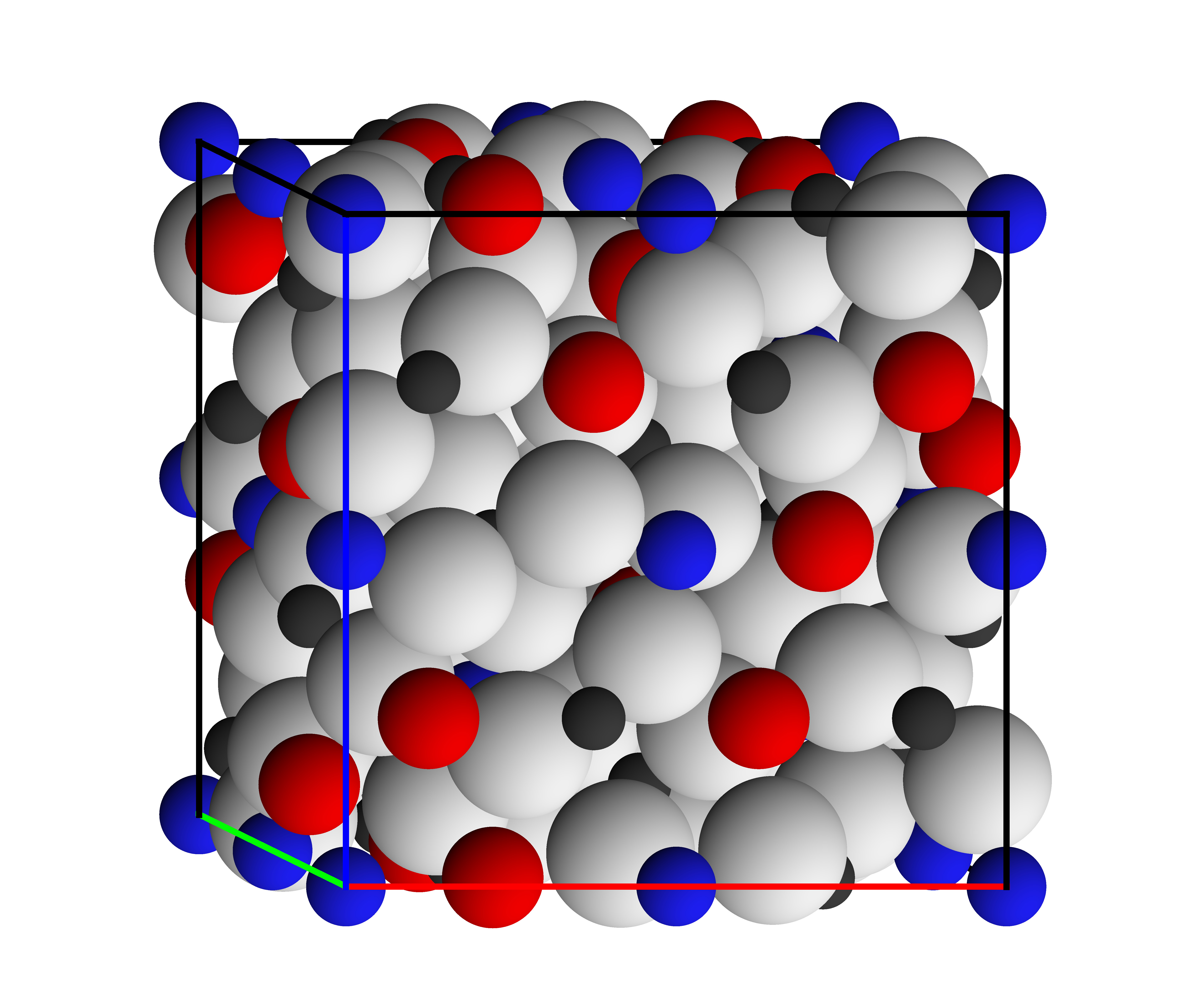
Crystal structure of pyrope garnet: White spheres are oxygen; black is silicon; blue is aluminium; and red is magnesium.

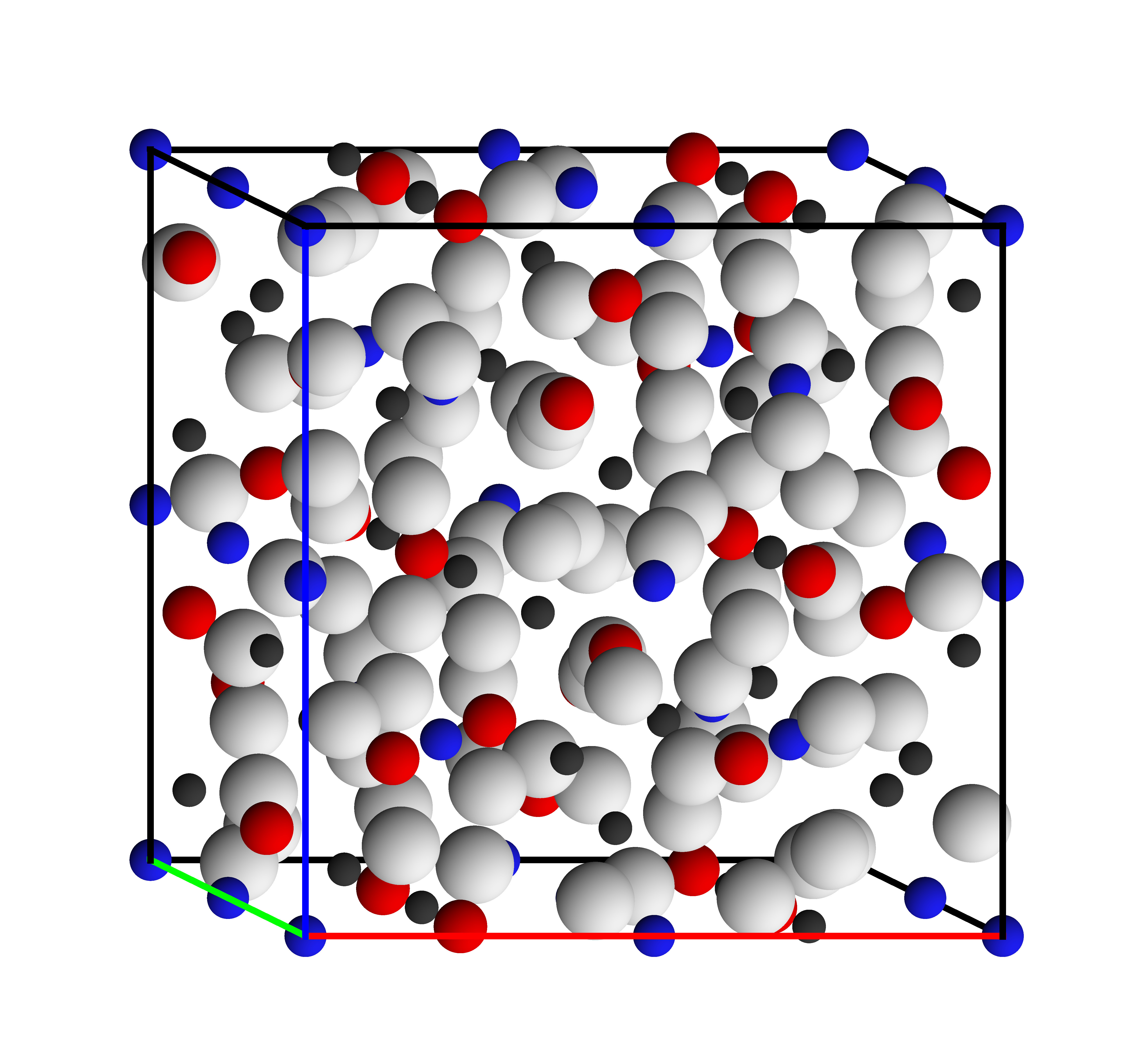
Same view, with ion sizes reduced to better show all ions

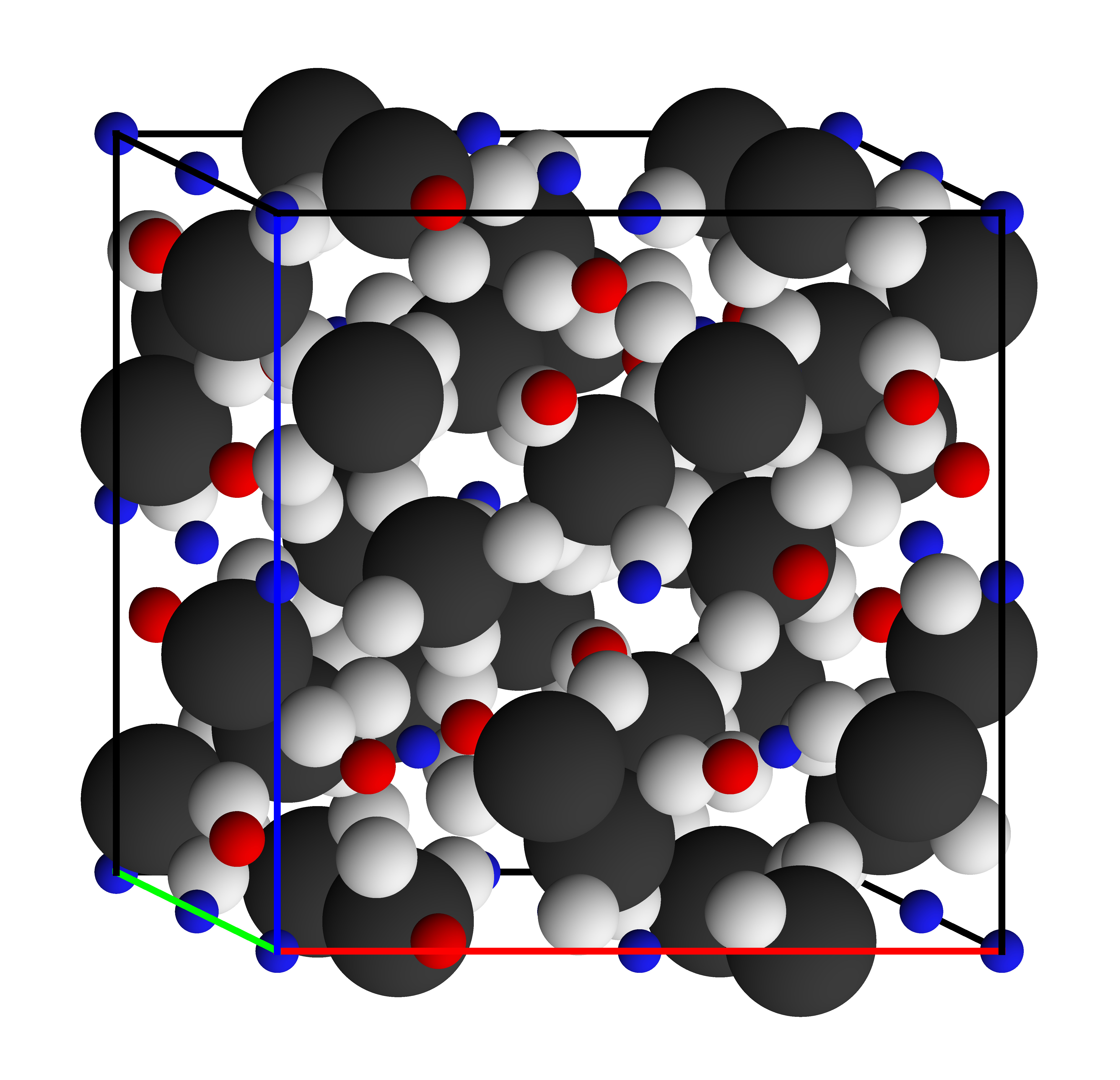
Silicon ion size exaggerated to emphasize silica tetrahedra

=== Hardness ===
Because the chemical composition of garnet varies, the atomic bonds in some species are stronger than in others. As a result, this mineral group shows a range of hardness on the Mohs scale of about 6.0 to 7.5. The harder species like almandine are often used for abrasive purposes.

=== Magnetics used in garnet series identification ===
For gem identification purposes, a pick-up response to a strong neodymium magnet separates garnet from all other natural transparent gemstones commonly used in the jewelry trade. Magnetic susceptibility measurements in conjunction with refractive index can be used to distinguish garnet species and varieties, and determine the composition of garnets in terms of percentages of end-member species within an individual gem.

== Garnet group end member species ==
=== Pyralspite garnets – aluminium in Y site ===
- Almandine: Fe_{3}Al_{2}(SiO_{4})_{3}
- Pyrope: Mg_{3}Al_{2}(SiO_{4})_{3}
- Spessartine: Mn_{3}Al_{2}(SiO_{4})_{3}

==== Almandine ====
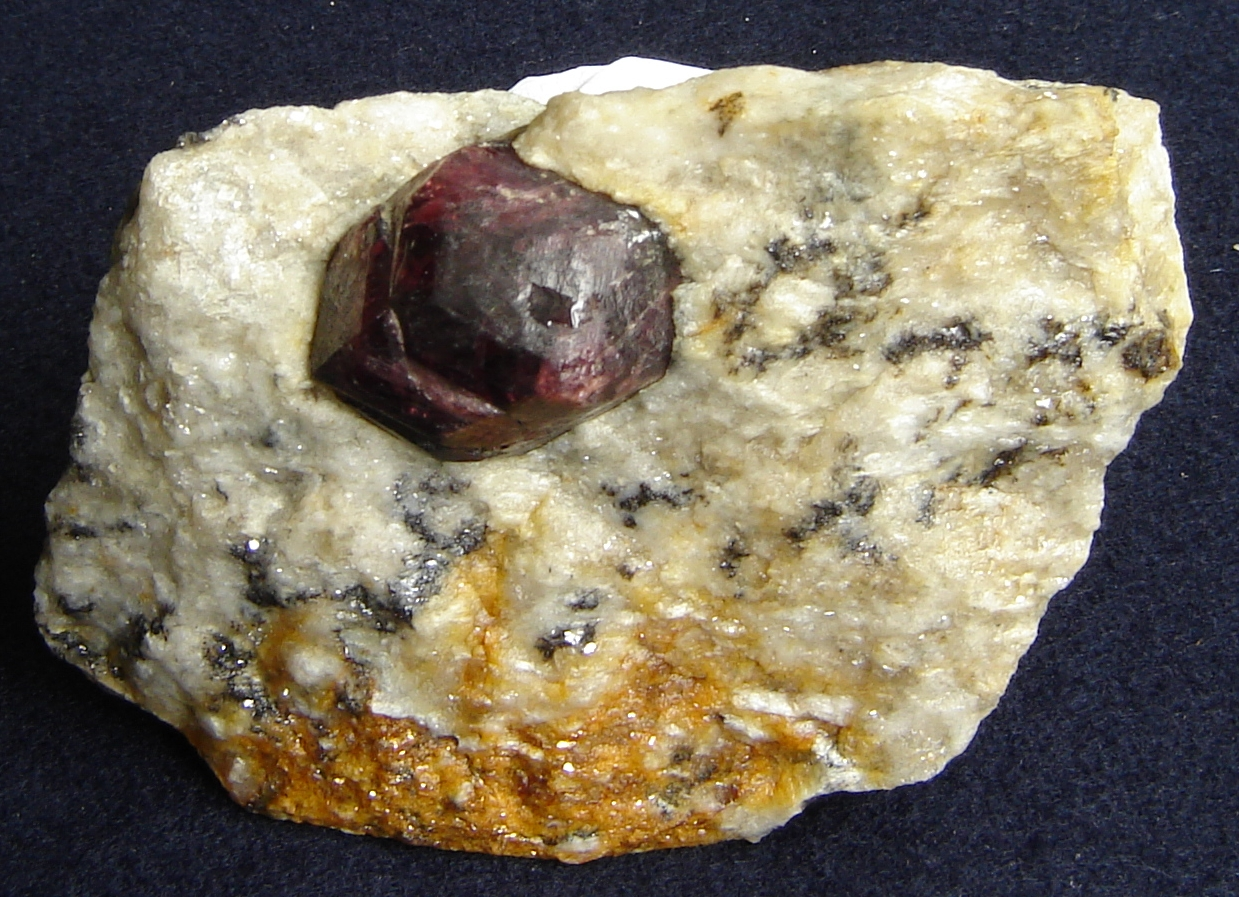
Almandine in metamorphic rock

Almandine, sometimes incorrectly called almandite, is the modern gem known as carbuncle (though originally almost any red gemstone was known by this name). The term "carbuncle" is derived from the Latin meaning "live coal" or burning charcoal. The name "almandine" is a corruption of Alabanda, a region in Asia Minor where these stones were cut in ancient times. Chemically, almandine is an iron-aluminium garnet with the formula Fe_{3}Al_{2}(SiO_{4})_{3}; the deep red transparent stones are often called precious garnet and are used as gemstones (being the most common of the gem garnets). Almandine occurs in metamorphic rocks like mica schists, associated with minerals such as staurolite, kyanite, andalusite, and others. Almandine has nicknames of Oriental garnet, almandine ruby, and carbuncle.

==== Pyrope ====
Pyrope (from the Greek pyrōpós meaning "firelike") is red in color and chemically an aluminium silicate with the formula Mg_{3}Al_{2}(SiO_{4})_{3}, though the magnesium can be replaced in part by calcium and ferrous iron. The color of pyrope varies from deep red to black. Pyrope and spessartine gemstones have been recovered from the Sloan diamondiferous kimberlites in Colorado, from the Bishop Conglomerate and in a Tertiary age lamprophyre at Cedar Mountain in Wyoming.

A variety of pyrope from Macon County, North Carolina, is a violet-red shade and has been called "rhodolite", Greek for rose. In chemical composition, it may be considered as essentially an isomorphous mixture of pyrope and almandine, in the proportion of two parts pyrope to one part almandine. Pyrope has tradenames some of which are misnomers: Cape ruby, Arizona ruby, California ruby, Rocky Mountain ruby, and Bohemian ruby from the Czech Republic.

Pyrope is an indicator mineral for high-pressure rocks. Mantle-derived rocks (peridotites and eclogites) commonly contain a pyrope variety.

==== Spessartine ====
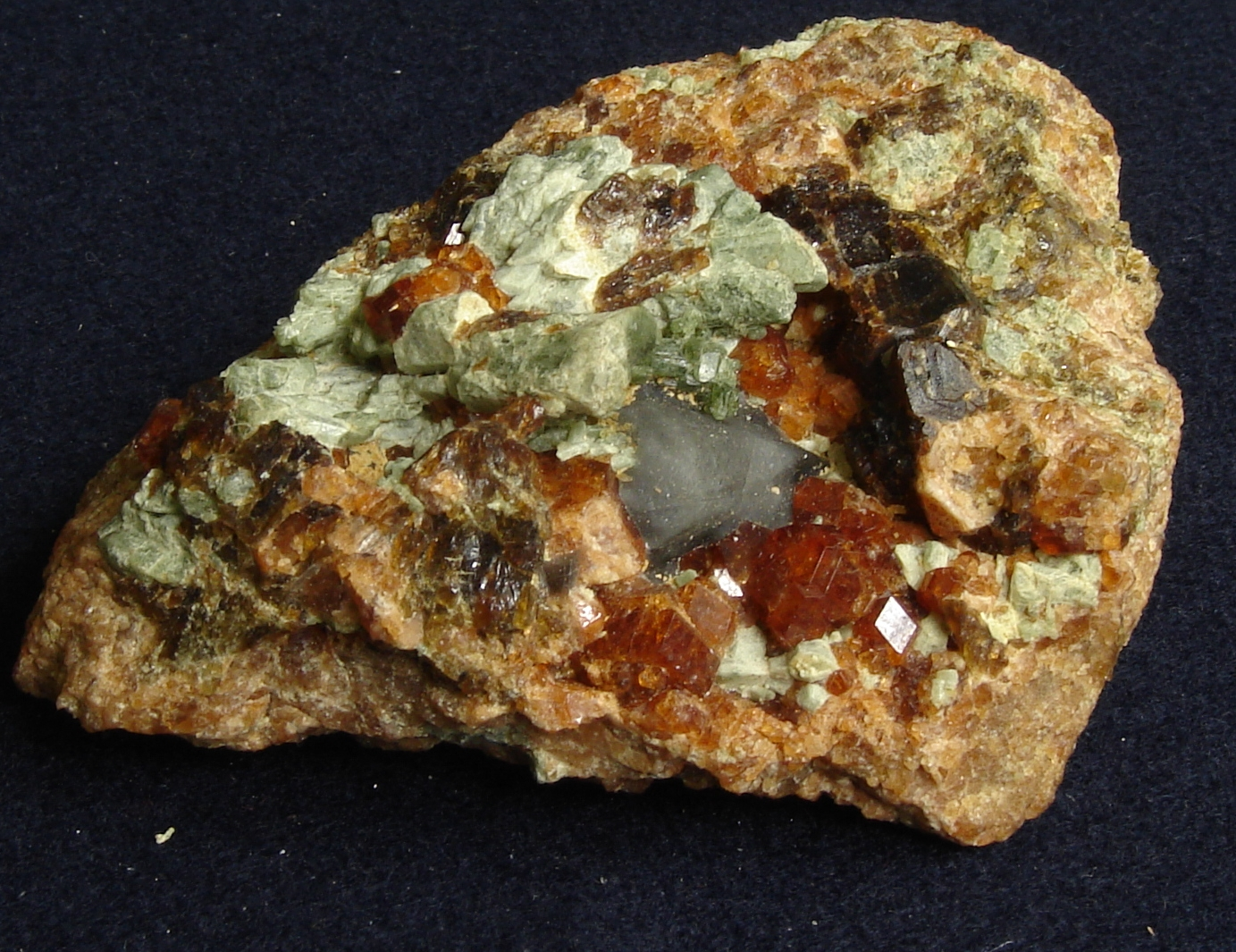
Spessartine (the reddish mineral)

Spessartine or spessartite is manganese aluminium garnet, Mn_{3}Al_{2}(SiO_{4})_{3}. Its name is derived from Spessart in Bavaria. It occurs most often in skarns, granite pegmatite and allied rock types, and in certain low grade metamorphic phyllites. Spessartine of an orange-yellow is found in Madagascar. Violet-red spessartines are found in rhyolites in Colorado and Maine.

==== Pyrope–spessartine (blue garnet or color-change garnet) ====
Blue pyrope–spessartine garnets were discovered in the late 1990s in Bekily, Madagascar. This type has also been found in parts of the United States, Russia, Kenya, Tanzania, and Turkey. It changes color from blue-green to purple depending on the color temperature of viewing light, as a result of the relatively high amounts of vanadium (about 1 wt.% V_{2}O_{3}).

Other varieties of color-changing garnets exist. In daylight, their color ranges from shades of green, beige, brown, gray, and blue, but in incandescent light, they appear a reddish or purplish/pink color.

This is the rarest type of garnet. Because of its color-changing quality, this kind of garnet resembles alexandrite.

=== Ugrandite group – calcium in X site ===
- Andradite: Ca_{3}Fe_{2}(SiO_{4})_{3}
- Grossular: Ca_{3}Al_{2}(SiO_{4})_{3}
- Uvarovite: Ca_{3}Cr_{2}(SiO_{4})_{3}

==== Andradite ====
Andradite is a calcium-iron garnet, Ca_{3}Fe_{2}(SiO_{4})_{3}, is of variable composition and may be red, yellow, brown, green, or black. The recognized varieties are demantoid (green), melanite (black), and topazolite (yellow or green). The red-brown translucent variety of colophonite is recognized as a partially obsolete name. Andradite is found in skarns and in deep-seated igneous rocks like syenite as well as serpentines and greenschists. Demantoid is one of the most prized of garnet varieties.

==== Grossular ====
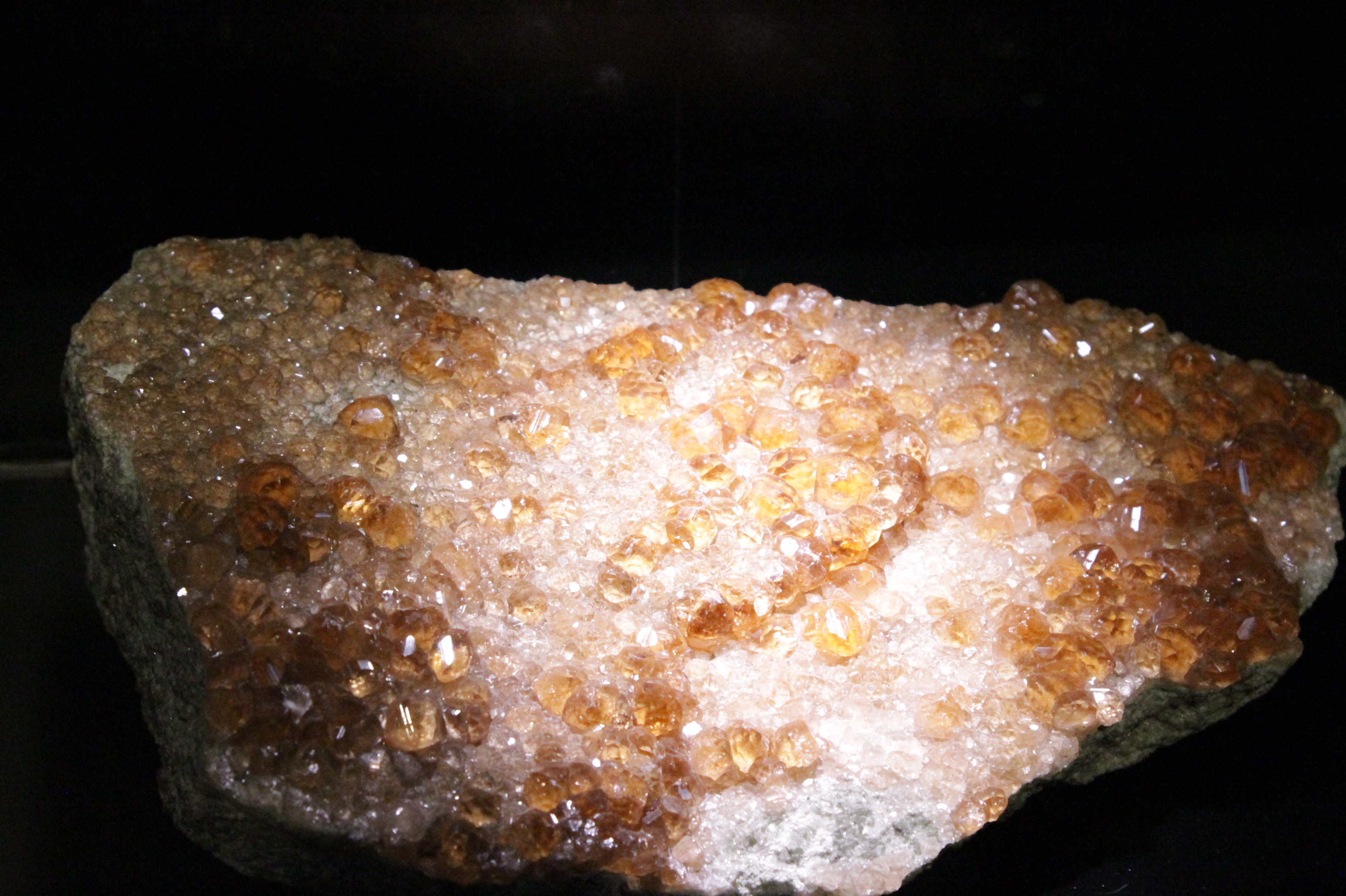
Grossular garnet from Quebec, collected by Dr John Hunter in the 18th century, Hunterian Museum, Glasgow

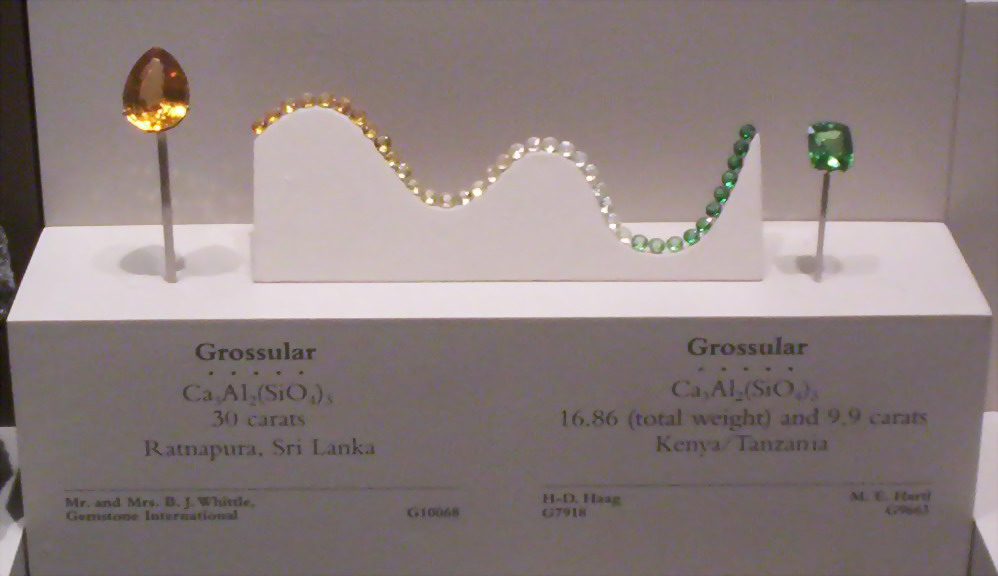
Grossular garnets on display at the U.S. National Museum of Natural History. The green gem at right is a type of grossular known as tsavorite.

Grossular is a calcium-aluminium garnet with the formula Ca_{3}Al_{2}(SiO_{4})_{3}, though the calcium may in part be replaced by ferrous iron and the aluminium by ferric iron. The name grossular is derived from the botanical former generic name for the gooseberry, Grossularia, in reference to the green garnet of this composition that is found in Siberia. Other shades include cinnamon brown (cinnamon stone variety), red, and yellow. Because of its inferior hardness to zircon, which the yellow crystals resemble, they have also been called hessonite from the Greek meaning inferior. Grossular is found in skarns, contact metamorphosed limestones with vesuvianite, diopside, wollastonite, and wernerite.

Grossular garnet from Kenya and Tanzania has been called tsavorite. Tsavorite was first described in the 1960s in the Tsavo area of Kenya, from which the gem takes its name.

==== Uvarovite ====
Uvarovite is a calcium chromium garnet with the formula Ca_{3}Cr_{2}(SiO_{4})_{3}. This is a rather rare garnet, bright green in color, usually found as small crystals associated with chromite in peridotite, serpentinite, and kimberlites. It is found in crystalline marbles and schists in the Ural Mountains of Russia and Outokumpu, Finland. Uvarovite is named for Count Uvarov, a Russian imperial statesman.

=== Less common species ===
- Calcium in X site
  - Goldmanite: Ca_{3}(V^{3+},Al,Fe^{3+})_{2}(SiO_{4})_{3}
  - Kimzeyite: Ca_{3}(Zr, Ti)_{2}[(Si,Al,Fe^{3+})O_{4}]_{3}
  - Morimotoite: Ca_{3}Ti^{4+}Fe^{2+}(SiO_{4})_{3}
  - Schorlomite: Ca_{3}Ti^{4+}_{2}(SiO_{4})(Fe^{3+}O_{4})_{2}
- Hydroxide bearing – calcium in X site
  - Hydrogrossular: Ca_{3}Al_{2}(SiO_{4})_{3−x}(OH)_{4x}
    - Hibschite: Ca_{3}Al_{2}(SiO_{4})_{3−x}(OH)_{4x} (where x is between 0.2 and 1.5)
    - Katoite: Ca_{3}Al_{2}(SiO_{4})_{3−x}(OH)_{4x} (where x is greater than 1.5)
- Magnesium or manganese in X site
  - Knorringite: Mg_{3}Cr_{2}(SiO_{4})_{3}
  - Majorite: Mg_{3}(Fe^{2+}Si)(SiO_{4})_{3}
  - Calderite: Mn_{3}Fe^{3+}_{2}(SiO_{4})_{3}

==== Knorringite ====
Knorringite is a magnesium-chromium garnet species with the formula Mg_{3}Cr_{2}(SiO_{4})_{3}. Pure endmember knorringite never occurs in nature. Pyrope rich in the knorringite component is only formed under high pressure and is often found in kimberlites. It is used as an indicator mineral in the search for diamonds.

== Garnet structural group ==
- Formula: X_{3}Z_{2}(TO_{4})_{3} (X = Ca, Fe, etc., Z = Al, Cr, etc., T = Si, As, V, Fe, Al)
  - All are cubic or strongly pseudocubic.

IMA/CNMNC Nickel-Strunz Mineral class	Mineral name	Formula	Crystal system	Point group	Space group
04 Oxide	Bitikleite-(SnAl)	Ca_{3}SnSb(AlO_{4})_{3}	isometric	m3̅m	Ia3̅d
04 Oxide	Bitikleite-(SnFe)	Ca_{3}(SnSb^{5+})(Fe^{3+}O_{4})_{3}	isometric	m3̅m	Ia3̅d
04 Oxide	Bitikleite-(ZrFe)	Ca_{3}SbZr(Fe^{3+}O_{4})_{3}	isometric	m3̅m	Ia3̅d
04 Tellurate	Yafsoanite	Ca_{3}Zn_{3}(Te^{6+}O_{6})_{2}	isometric	m3̅m or 432	Ia3̅d or I4_{1}32
08 Arsenate	Berzeliite	NaCa_{2}Mg_{2}(AsO_{4})_{3}	isometric	m3̅m	Ia3̅d
08 Vanadate	Palenzonaite	NaCa_{2}Mn^{2+}_{2}(VO_{4})_{3}	isometric	m3̅m	Ia3̅d
08 Vanadate	Schäferite	NaCa_{2}Mg_{2}(VO_{4})_{3}	isometric	m3̅m	Ia3̅d

- IMA/CNMNC – Nickel-Strunz – Mineral subclass: 09.A Nesosilicate
  - Nickel-Strunz classification: 09.AD.25

Mineral name	Formula	Crystal system	Point group	Space group
Almandine	Fe^{2+}_{3}Al_{2}(SiO_{4})_{3}	isometric	m3̅m	Ia3̅d
Andradite	Ca_{3}Fe^{3+}_{2}(SiO_{4})_{3}	isometric	m3̅m	Ia3̅d
Calderite	Mn^{+2}_{3}Fe^{+3}_{2}(SiO_{4})_{3}	isometric	m3̅m	Ia3̅d
Goldmanite	Ca_{3}V^{3+}_{2}(SiO_{4})_{3}	isometric	m3̅m	Ia3̅d
Grossular	Ca_{3}Al_{2}(SiO_{4})_{3}	isometric	m3̅m	Ia3̅d
Henritermierite	Ca_{3}Mn^{3+}_{2}(SiO_{4})_{2}(OH)_{4}	tetragonal	4/mmm	I4_{1}/acd
Hibschite	Ca_{3}Al_{2}(SiO_{4})_{(3−x)}(OH)_{4x} (x= 0.2–1.5)	isometric	m3̅m	Ia3̅d
Katoite	Ca_{3}Al_{2}(SiO_{4})_{(3−x)}(OH)_{4x} (x= 1.5–3)	isometric	m3̅m	Ia3̅d
Kerimasite	Ca_{3}Zr_{2}(Fe^{+3}O_{4})_{2}(SiO_{4})	isometric	m3̅m	Ia3̅d
Kimzeyite	Ca_{3}Zr_{2}(Al^{+3}O_{4})_{2}(SiO_{4})	isometric	m3̅m	Ia3̅d
Knorringite	Mg_{3}Cr_{2}(SiO_{4})_{3}	isometric	m3̅m	Ia3̅d
Majorite	Mg_{3}(Fe^{2+}Si)(SiO_{4})_{3}	tetragonal	4/m or 4/mmm	I4_{1}/a or I4_{1}/acd
Menzerite-(Y)	Y_{2}CaMg_{2}(SiO_{4})_{3}	isometric	m3̅m	Ia3̅d
Momoiite	Mn^{2+}_{3}V^{3+}_{2}(SiO_{4})_{3}	isometric	m3̅m	Ia3̅d
Morimotoite	Ca_{3}(Fe^{2+}Ti^{4+})(SiO_{4})_{3}	isometric	m3̅m	Ia3̅d
Pyrope	Mg_{3}Al_{2}(SiO_{4})_{3}	isometric	m3̅m	Ia3̅d
Schorlomite	Ca_{3}Ti^{4+}_{2}(Fe^{3+}O_{4})_{2}(SiO_{4})	isometric	m3̅m	Ia3̅d
Spessartine	Mn^{2+}_{3}Al_{2}(SiO_{4})_{3}	isometric	m3̅m	Ia3̅d
Toturite	Ca_{3}Sn_{2}(Fe^{3+}O_{4})_{2}(SiO_{4})	isometric	m3̅m	Ia3̅d
Uvarovite	Ca_{3}Cr_{2}(SiO_{4})_{3}	isometric	m3̅m	Ia3̅d

- References: Mindat.org; mineral name, chemical formula and space group (American Mineralogist Crystal Structure Database) of the IMA Database of Mineral Properties/ RRUFF Project, Univ. of Arizona, was preferred most of the time. Minor components in formulae have been left out to highlight the dominant chemical endmember that defines each species.

== Synthetic garnets ==
Synthetic garnets are also known as rare-earth garnets. The crystallographic structure of garnets has been expanded from the prototype to include chemicals with the general formula A_{3}B_{2}(CO_{4})_{3}. Besides silicon, a large number of elements have been put on the C site, including germanium, gallium, aluminium, vanadium and iron.

Yttrium aluminium garnet (YAG), Y_{3}Al_{2}(AlO_{4})_{3}, is used for synthetic gemstones. Due to its fairly high refractive index, YAG was used as a diamond simulant in the 1970s until the methods of producing the more advanced simulant cubic zirconia in commercial quantities were developed. When doped with neodymium (Nd^{3+}), erbium or gadolinium YAG may be used as the lasing medium in Nd:YAG lasers, Er:YAG lasers and Gd:YAG lasers respectively. These doped YAG lasers are used in medical procedures including laser skin resurfacing, dentistry, and ophthalmology.

Interesting magnetic properties arise when the appropriate elements are used. In yttrium iron garnet (YIG), Y_{3}Fe_{2}(FeO_{4})_{3}, the five iron(III) ions occupy two octahedral and three tetrahedral sites, with the yttrium(III) ions coordinated by eight oxygen ions in an irregular cube. The iron ions in the two coordination sites exhibit different spins, resulting in magnetic behavior. YIG is a ferrimagnetic material having a Curie temperature of 550 °K. Yttrium iron garnet can be made into YIG spheres, which serve as magnetically tunable filters and resonators for microwave frequencies.

Lutetium aluminium garnet (LuAG), Al_{5}Lu_{3}O_{12}, is an inorganic compound with a unique crystal structure primarily known for its use in high-efficiency laser devices. LuAG is also useful in the synthesis of transparent ceramics. LuAG is particularly favored over other crystals for its high density and thermal conductivity; it has a relatively small lattice constant in comparison to the other rare-earth garnets, which results in a higher density producing a crystal field with narrower linewidths and greater energy level splitting in absorption and emission.

Terbium gallium garnet (TGG), Tb_{3}Ga_{5}O_{12}, is a Faraday rotator material with excellent transparency properties and is very resistant to laser damage. TGG can be used in optical isolators for laser systems, in optical circulators for fiber optic systems, in optical modulators, and in current and magnetic field sensors.

Another example is gadolinium gallium garnet (GGG), Gd_{3}Ga_{2}(GaO_{4})_{3} which is synthesized for use as a substrate for liquid-phase epitaxy of magnetic garnet films for bubble memory and magneto-optical applications.

== Production ==
Garnet production

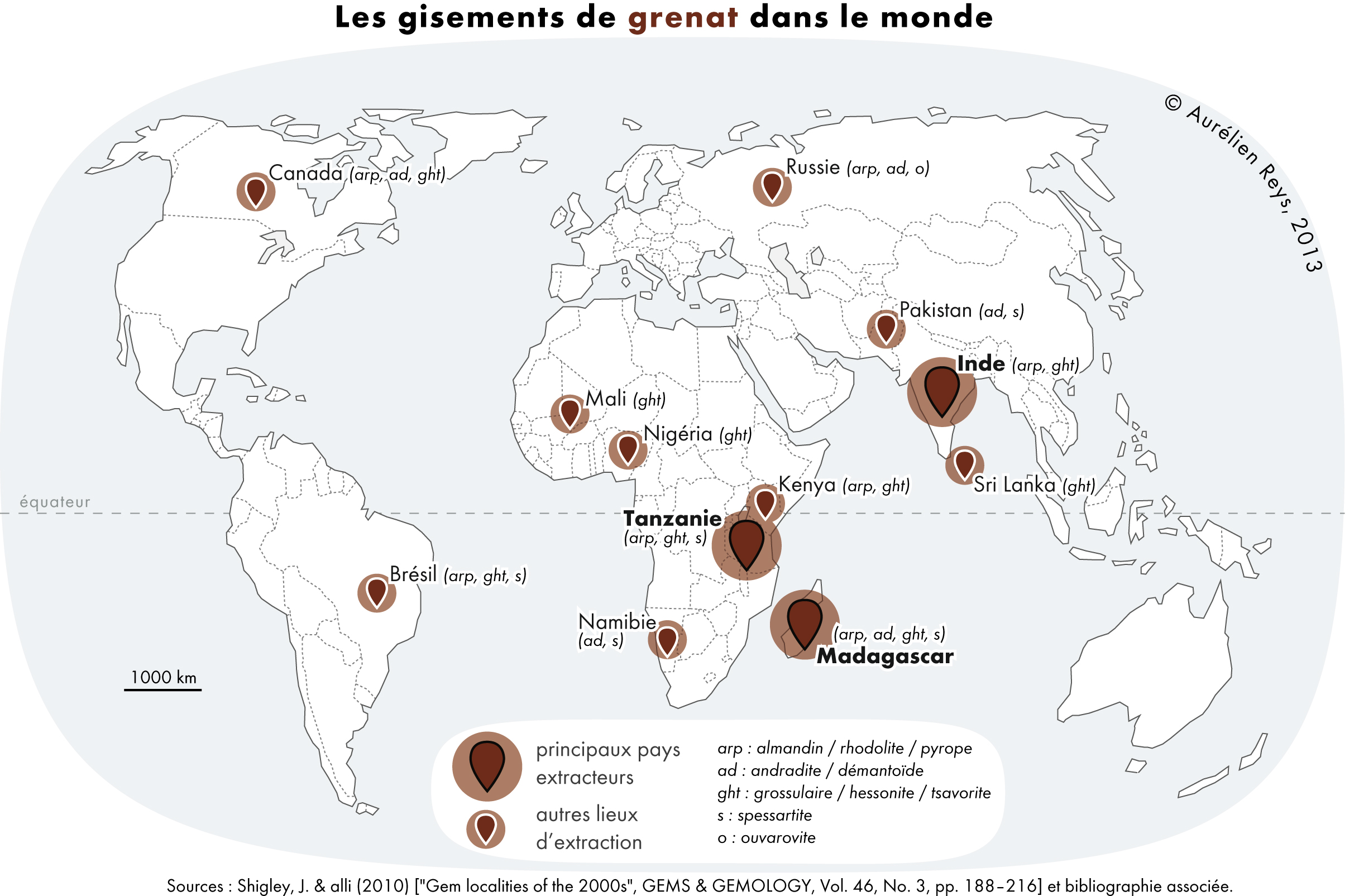
Main garnet producing countries

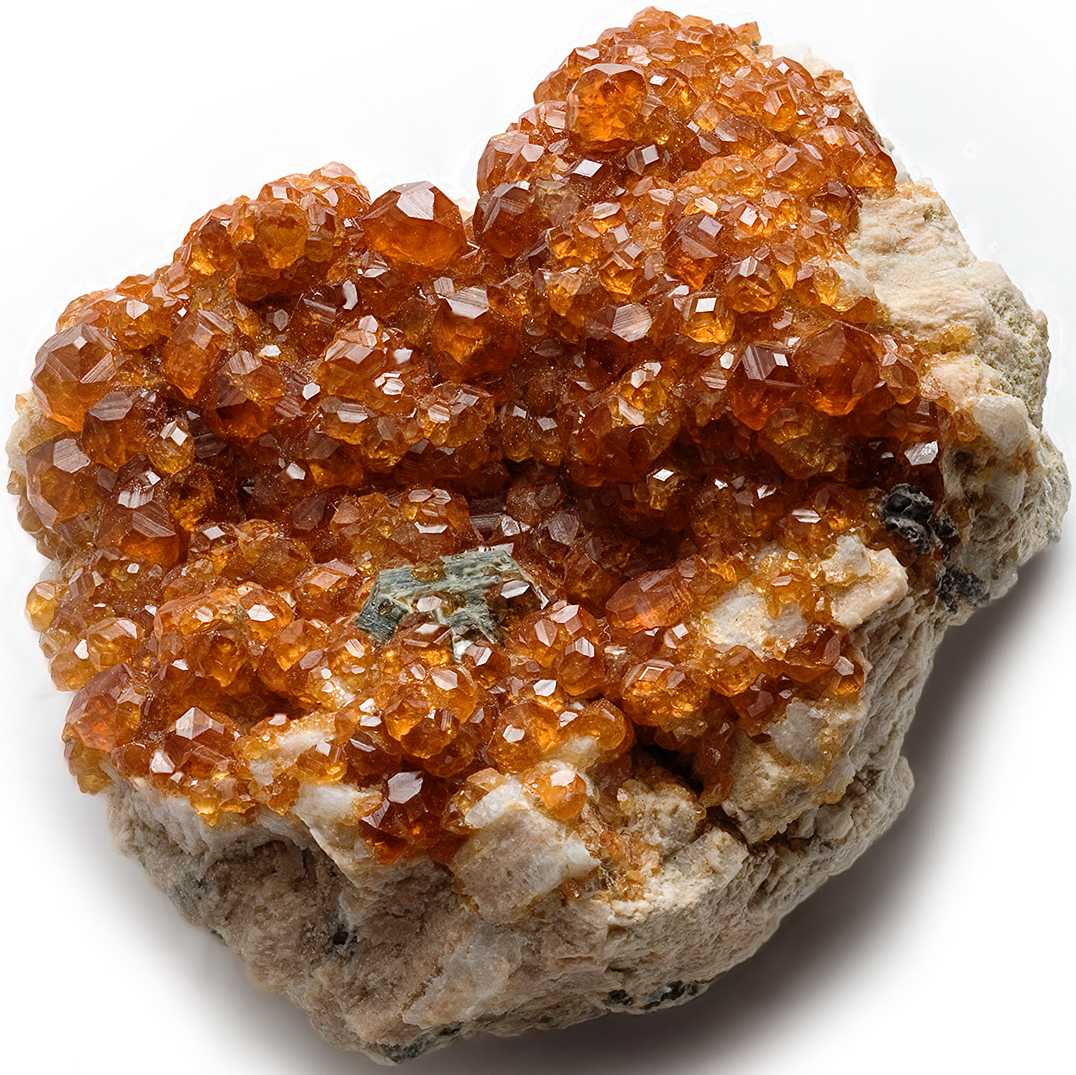
Garnet var. Spessartine, Putian City, Putian Prefecture, Fujian Province, China

The mineral garnet is commonly found in metamorphic and to a lesser extent, igneous rocks. Most natural garnets are compositionally zoned and contain inclusions. Its crystal lattice structure is stable at high pressures and temperatures and is thus found in green-schist facies metamorphic rocks including gneiss, hornblende schist, and mica schist. The composition that is stable at the pressure and temperature conditions of Earth's mantle is pyrope, which is often found in peridotites and kimberlites, as well as the serpentines that form from them. Garnets are unique in that they can record the pressures and temperatures of peak metamorphism and are used as geobarometers and geothermometers in the study of geothermobarometry which determines "P-T Paths", Pressure-Temperature Paths. Garnets are used as an index mineral in the delineation of isograds in metamorphic rocks. Compositional zoning and inclusions can mark the change from growth of the crystals at low temperatures to higher temperatures. Garnets that are not compositionally zoned more than likely experienced ultra high temperatures (above 700 °C) that led to diffusion of major elements within the crystal lattice, effectively homogenizing the crystal or they were never zoned. Garnets can also form metamorphic textures that can help interpret structural histories.

In addition to being used to devolve conditions of metamorphism, garnets can be used to date certain geologic events. Garnet has been developed as a U-Pb geochronometer, to date the age of crystallization as well as a thermochronometer in the (U-Th)/He system to date timing of cooling below a closure temperature.

Garnets can be chemically altered and most often alter to serpentine, talc, and chlorite.

=== Largest crystal ===
The open-pit Barton Garnet Mine, located at Gore Mountain in the Adirondack Mountains, yields the world's largest single crystals of garnet; diameters range from 5 to 35 cm and commonly average 10–18 cm.

Gore Mountain garnets are unique in many respects, and considerable effort has been made to determine the timing of garnet growth. The first dating was that of Basu et al. (1989), who used plagioclase-hornblende-garnet to produce a Sm/Nd isochron that yielded an age of 1059 ± 19 Ma. Mezger et al. (1992) conducted their own Sm/Nd investigation using hornblende and the drilled core of a 50 cm garnet to produce an isochron age of 1051 ± 4 Ma. Connelly (2006) utilized seven different fractions of a Gore Mountain garnet to obtain a Lu-Hf isochron age of 1046.6 ± 6 Ma. It is therefore concluded with confidence that the garnets formed at 1049 ± 5 Ma, the average of the three determinations. This is also the local age of peak metamorphism in the 1090–1040 Ma Ottawan phase of the Grenvillian orogeny and serves as a critical data point in ascertaining the evolution of the megacrystic garnet deposits.

== Uses ==
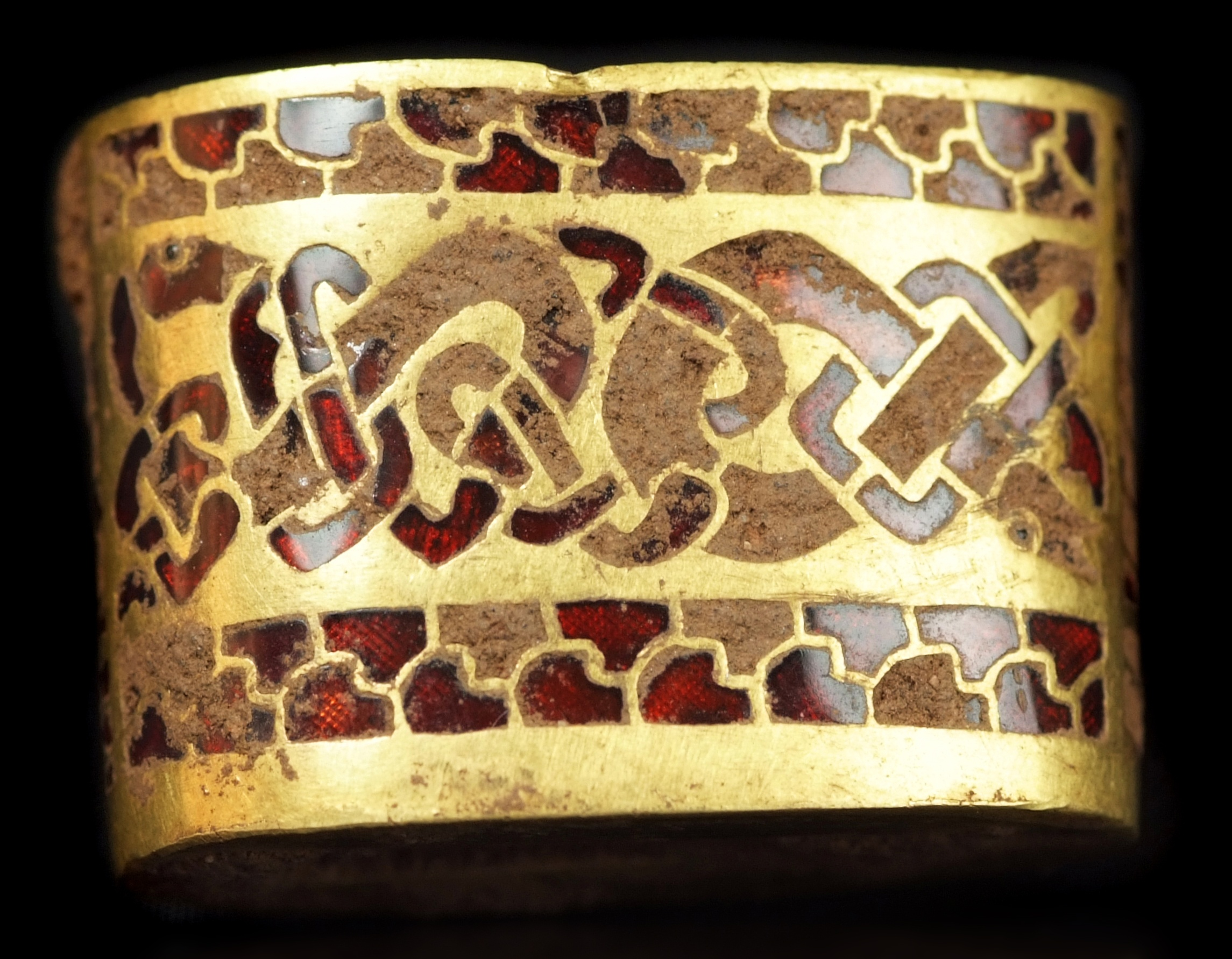
c. 7th century AD, Anglo-Saxon seax hilt fitting – gold with gemstone inlay of garnet cloisonné. From the Staffordshire Hoard, found in 2009, and not fully cleaned

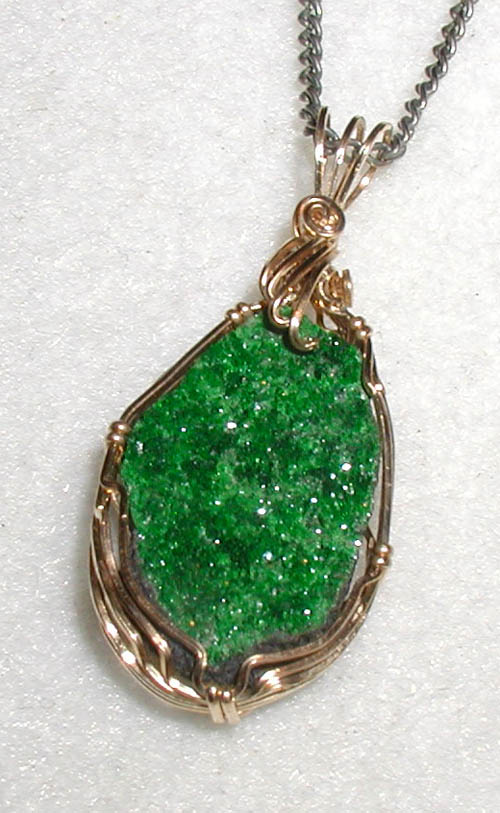
Pendant in uvarovite, a rare bright-green garnet

=== Gemstones ===
Red garnets were the most commonly used gemstones in the Late Antique Roman world, and the Migration Period art of the "barbarian" peoples who took over the territory of the Western Roman Empire. They were especially used inlaid in gold cells in the cloisonné technique, a style often just called garnet cloisonné, found from Anglo-Saxon England, as at Sutton Hoo, to the Black Sea. Thousands of Tamraparniyan gold, silver and red garnet shipments were made in the Old World, including to Rome, Greece, the Middle East, Serica and Anglo Saxons; recent findings such as the Staffordshire Hoard and the pendant of the Winfarthing Woman skeleton of Norfolk confirm an established gem trade route with South India and Tamraparni (ancient Sri Lanka), known from antiquity for its production of gemstones.

Pure crystals of garnet are still used as gemstones. The gemstone varieties occur in shades of green, red, yellow, and orange. In the United States it is known as the birthstone for January. It is also the birthstone of Aquarius and Capricorn in tropical astrology. The garnet family is one of the most complex in the gem world. It is not a single species, but is composed of multiple species and varieties.

Almandine garnet is the state mineral of Connecticut, star garnet is the state gemstone of Idaho, garnet is the state gemstone of New York, and grossular garnet is the state gemstone of Vermont.

=== Industrial uses ===
Garnet sand is a good abrasive, and a common replacement for silica sand in abrasive blasting operations. Alluvial garnet grains which are rounder are more suitable for such blasting treatments. Mixed with very high pressure water, garnet is used to cut steel and other materials in water jets. For water jet cutting, garnet extracted from hard rock is suitable since it is more angular in form, therefore more efficient in cutting.

Garnet paper is favored by cabinetmakers for finishing bare wood.

Garnet sand is also used for water filtration media.

As an abrasive, garnet can be broadly divided into two categories; blasting grade and water jet grade. The garnet, as it is mined and collected, is crushed to finer grains; all pieces which are larger than 60 mesh (250 micrometers) are normally used for sand blasting. The pieces between 60 mesh (250 micrometers) and 200 mesh (74 micrometers) are normally used for water jet cutting. The remaining garnet pieces that are finer than 200 mesh (74 micrometers) are used for glass polishing and lapping. Regardless of the application, the larger grain sizes are used for faster work and the smaller ones are used for finer finishes.

There are different kinds of abrasive garnets which can be divided based on their origin. The largest source of abrasive garnet today is garnet-rich beach sand which is quite abundant on Indian and Australian coasts and the main producers today are Australia and India.

This material is particularly popular due to its consistent supplies, huge quantities and clean material. The common problems with this material are the presence of ilmenite and chloride compounds. Since the material has been naturally crushed and ground on the beaches for past centuries, the material is normally available in fine sizes only. Most of the garnet at the Tuticorin beach in south India is 80 mesh, and ranges from 56 mesh to 100 mesh size.

River garnet is particularly abundant in Australia. The river sand garnet occurs as a placer deposit.

Rock garnet is perhaps the garnet type used for the longest period of time. This type of garnet is produced in America, China and western India. These crystals are crushed in mills and then purified by wind blowing, magnetic separation, sieving and, if required, washing. Being freshly crushed, this garnet has the sharpest edges and therefore performs far better than other kinds of garnet. Both the river and the beach garnet suffer from the tumbling effect of hundreds of thousands of years which rounds off the edges. Gore Mountain Garnet from Warren County, New York, USA, is a significant source of rock garnet for use as an industrial abrasive.

== See also ==
- Abrasive blasting
- Rhombic dodecahedron
