= Pyrope =

Mineral of the garnet group

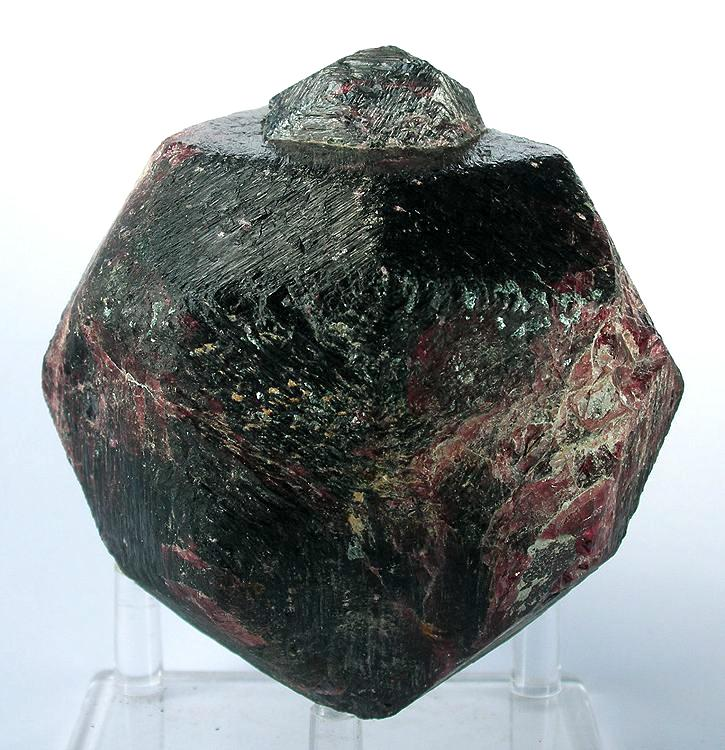

General
- Category: Nesosilicate
- Formula: Mg_{3}Al_{2}(SiO_{4})_{3}
- IMA symbol: Prp
- Strunz classification: 9.AD.25
- Crystal system: Cubic
- Crystal class: Hexoctahedral (m3̅m); H–M symbol: (4/m 3̅ 2/m)
- Space group: Ia3̅d

Identification
- Color: Blood red to black red, red, orange red, pink, some varieties are very dark, almost black, while others can take tones of purple to purple red, Some chromium-rich pyropes are thermochromic, becoming green when heated.
- Crystal habit: Euhedra typically display rhombic dodecahedral form, but trapezohedra are not uncommon, and hexoctahedra are seen in some rare samples. Massive and granular forms also occur.
- Cleavage: None
- Fracture: Conchoidal
- Mohs scale hardness: 7.0–7.5
- Luster: greasy to vitreous
- Streak: White
- Specific gravity: 3.78+0.09 −0.16
- Polish luster: vitreous
- Optical properties: Single refractive, often anomalous double refractive
- Refractive index: 1.74 normal, but ranges from 1.714 to over 1.742
- Birefringence: Isotropic, appears black in cross-polarized light
- Pleochroism: none
- Ultraviolet fluorescence: inert
- Absorption spectra: broad band at 564 nm with cutoff at 440 to 445 nm. Fine gem quality pyropes may show chromium lines in the red end of the spectrum
- Solubility: Insoluble in water, weakly soluble in HF
- Mineral association: Olivine, pyroxene, hornblende, biotite, diamond

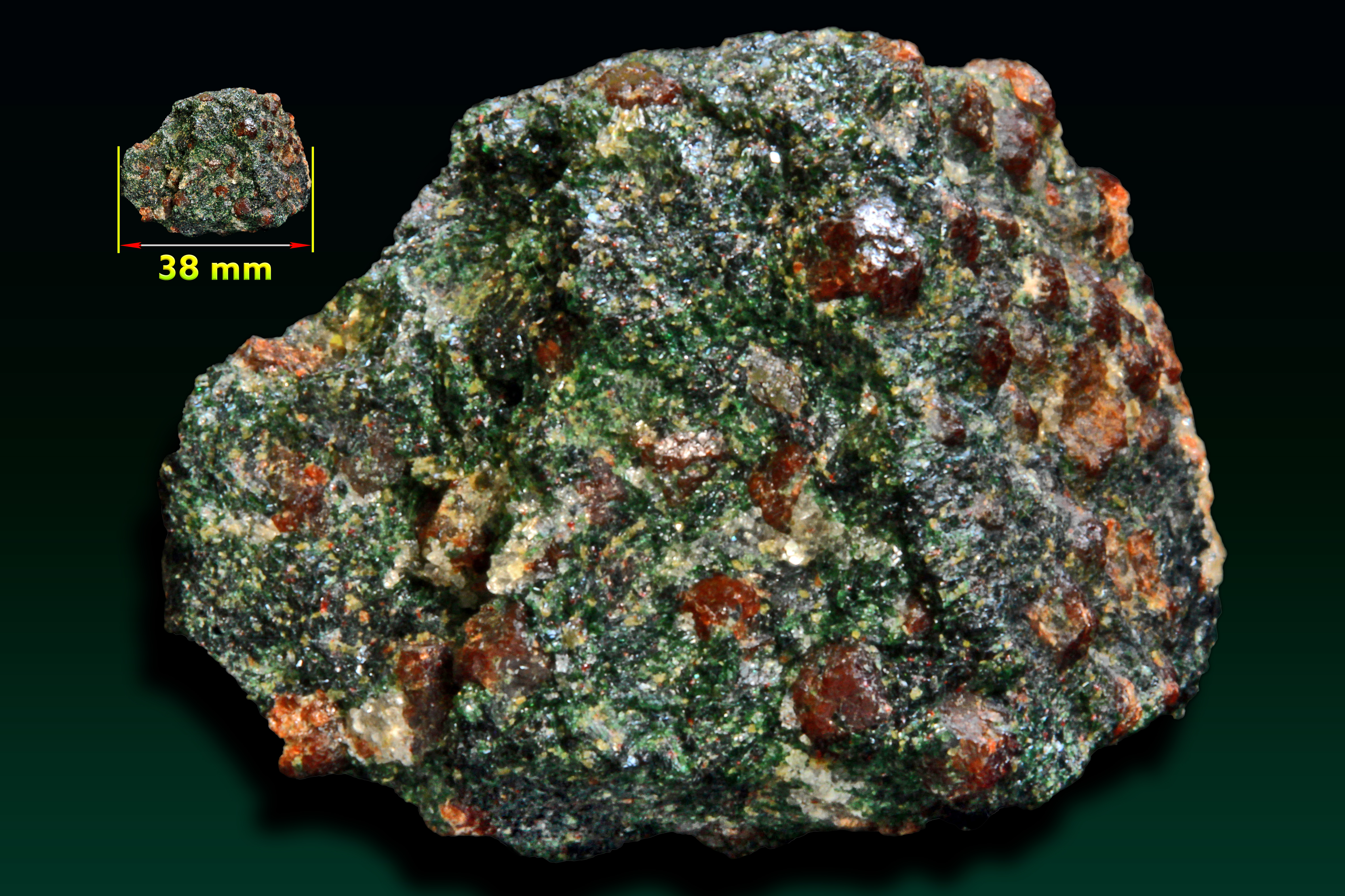
Pyrope garnet in eclogite - Shibino, Ural Mountains, Russia.

The mineral pyrope is a member of the garnet group. Pyrope is the only member of the garnet family to always display red colouration in natural samples, and it is from this characteristic that it gets its name: from the Greek words for fire and eye. Despite being less common than most garnets, it is a widely used gemstone with numerous alternative names, some of which are misnomers. Chrome pyrope, and Bohemian garnet are two alternative names, the usage of the latter being discouraged by the Gemological Institute of America. Misnomers include Colorado ruby, Arizona ruby, California ruby, Rocky Mountain ruby, Elie Ruby, Bohemian carbuncle, and Cape ruby.

== Composition ==
The composition of pure pyrope is Mg_{3}Al_{2}(SiO_{4})_{3}, although typically other elements are present in at least minor proportions—these other elements include Ca, Cr, Fe and Mn. Pyrope forms a solid solution series with almandine and spessartine, which are collectively known as the pyralspite garnets (pyrope, almandine, spessartine). Iron and manganese substitute for the magnesium in the pyrope structure. The resultant, mixed composition garnets are defined according to their pyrope-almandine ratio. The semi-precious stone rhodolite is a garnet of ~70% pyrope composition.

== Distribution ==
The origin of most pyrope is in ultramafic rocks, typically peridotite from the Earth's mantle: these mantle-derived peridotites can be attributed both to igneous and metamorphic processes. Pyrope also occurs in ultrahigh-pressure (UHP) metamorphic rocks, as in the Dora-Maira massif in the western Alps. In that massif, nearly pure pyrope occurs in crystals to almost 12 cm (5 in) in diameter; some of that pyrope has inclusions of coesite, and some has inclusions of enstatite and sapphirine.

Pyrope is common in peridotite xenoliths from kimberlite pipes, some of which are diamond-bearing. Pyrope found in association with diamond commonly has a Cr_{2}O_{3} content of 3–8%, which imparts a distinctive violet to deep purple coloration (often with a greenish tinge) and because of this is often used as a kimberlite indicator mineral in areas where erosive activity makes pinpointing the origin of the pipe difficult. These varieties are known as chrome-pyrope, or G9/G10 garnets.

== Mineral identification ==
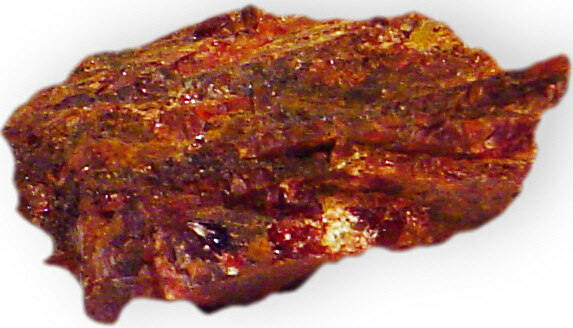
Pyrope aggregate.

In hand specimens, pyrope is very tricky to distinguish from almandine; however, it is likely to display fewer flaws and inclusions. Other distinguishing criteria are listed in the adjacent table. Care should be taken when using these properties as many of those listed have been determined from synthetically grown, pure-composition pyrope. Others, such as pyrope's high specific gravity, may be of little use when studying a small crystal embedded in a matrix of other silicate minerals. In these cases, mineral association with other mafic and ultramafic minerals may be the best indication that the garnet you are studying is pyrope.

In petrographic thin section, the most distinguishing features of pyrope are those shared with the other common garnets: high relief and isotropy. Garnets tend to be less strongly coloured than other silicate minerals in thin section, although pyrope may show a pale pinkish purple hue in plane-polarized light. The lack of cleavage, commonly euhedral crystal morphology, and mineral associations should also be used in identification of pyrope under the microscope.
