= Almandine =

Species of mineral belonging to the garnet group

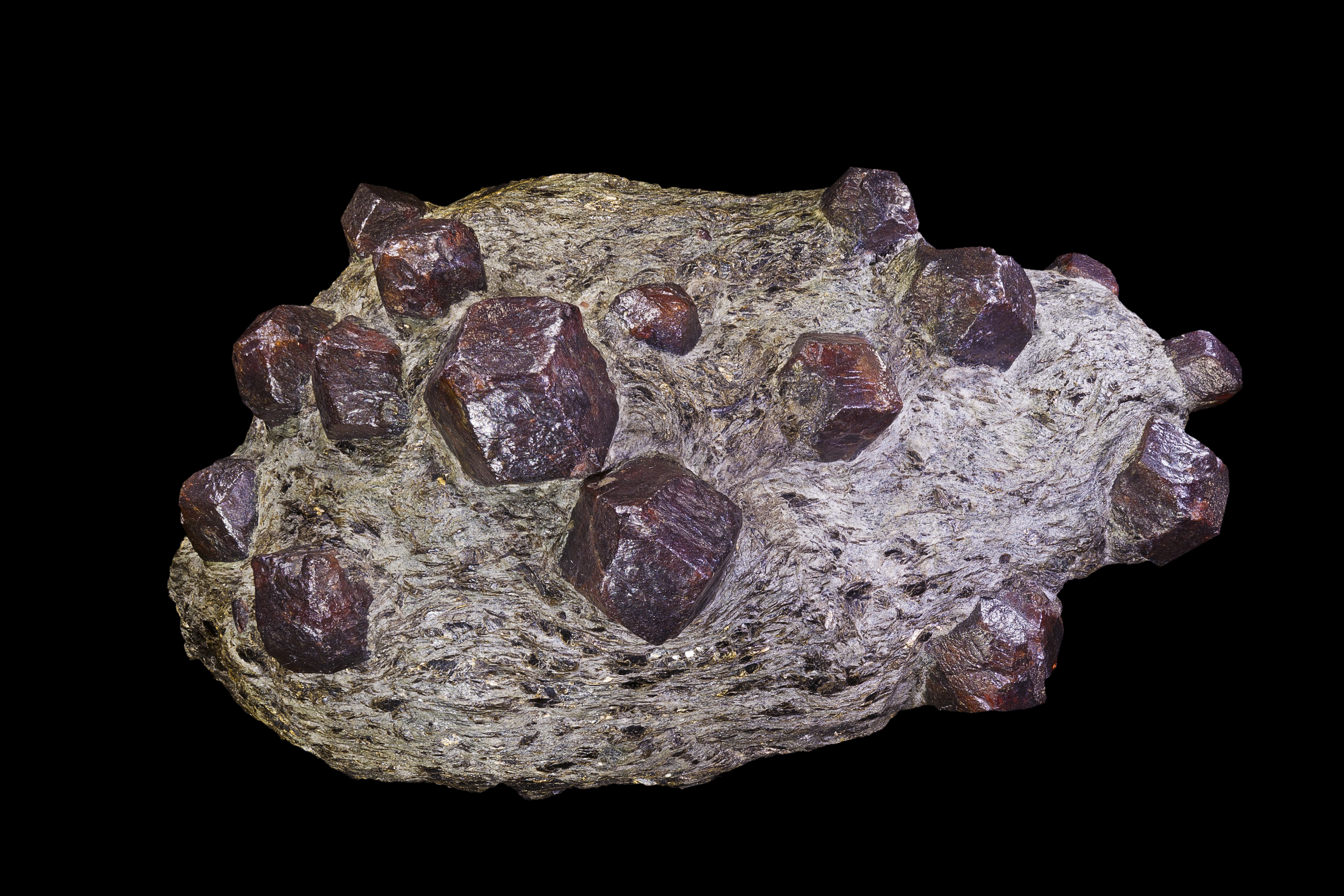

General
- Category: Nesosilicate
- Formula: Fe^{2+}_{3}Al_{2}Si_{3}O_{12}
- IMA symbol: Alm
- Strunz classification: 9.AD.25
- Crystal system: Cubic
- Crystal class: Hexoctahedral (m3̅m); H–M symbol: (4/m 3̅ 2/m)
- Space group: Ia3̅d

Identification
- Color: reddish orange to red, slightly purplish red to reddish purple and usually dark in tone
- Cleavage: none
- Fracture: conchoidal
- Mohs scale hardness: 7.0–7.5
- Luster: greasy to vitreous
- Streak: white
- Specific gravity: 4.05+0.25 −0.12
- Polish luster: vitreous to subadamantine
- Optical properties: Single refractive, and often anomalous double refractive
- Refractive index: 1.790±0.030
- Birefringence: none
- Pleochroism: none
- Dispersion: 0.024
- Ultraviolet fluorescence: inert
- Absorption spectra: usually at 504, 520, and 573 nm, may also have faint lines at 423, 460, 610 and 680–690 nm

Almandine (/ˈælməndɪn/), also known as almandite, is a mineral belonging to the garnet group. The name is a corruption of alabandicus, which is the name applied by Pliny the Elder to a stone found or worked at Alabanda, a town in Caria in Asia Minor. Almandine is an iron aluminium garnet, of deep red color, inclining to purple. It is frequently cut with a convex face, or en cabochon, and is then known as carbuncle. Viewed through the spectroscope in a strong light, it generally shows three characteristic absorption bands.

Almandine is one end-member of a mineral solid solution series, with the other end member being the garnet pyrope. The almandine crystal formula is: Fe_{3}Al_{2}(SiO_{4})_{3}. Magnesium substitutes for the iron with increasingly pyrope-rich composition.

Almandine, Fe^{2+}_{3}Al_{2}Si_{3}O_{12}, is the ferrous iron end member of the class of garnet minerals representing an important group of rock-forming silicates, which are the main constituents of the Earth's crust, upper mantle and transition zone. Almandine crystallizes in the cubic space group Ia3̅d, with unit-cell parameter a ≈ 11.512 Å at 100 K.

Almandine is antiferromagnetic with the Néel temperature of 7.5 K. It contains two equivalent magnetic sublattices.

== Occurrence ==
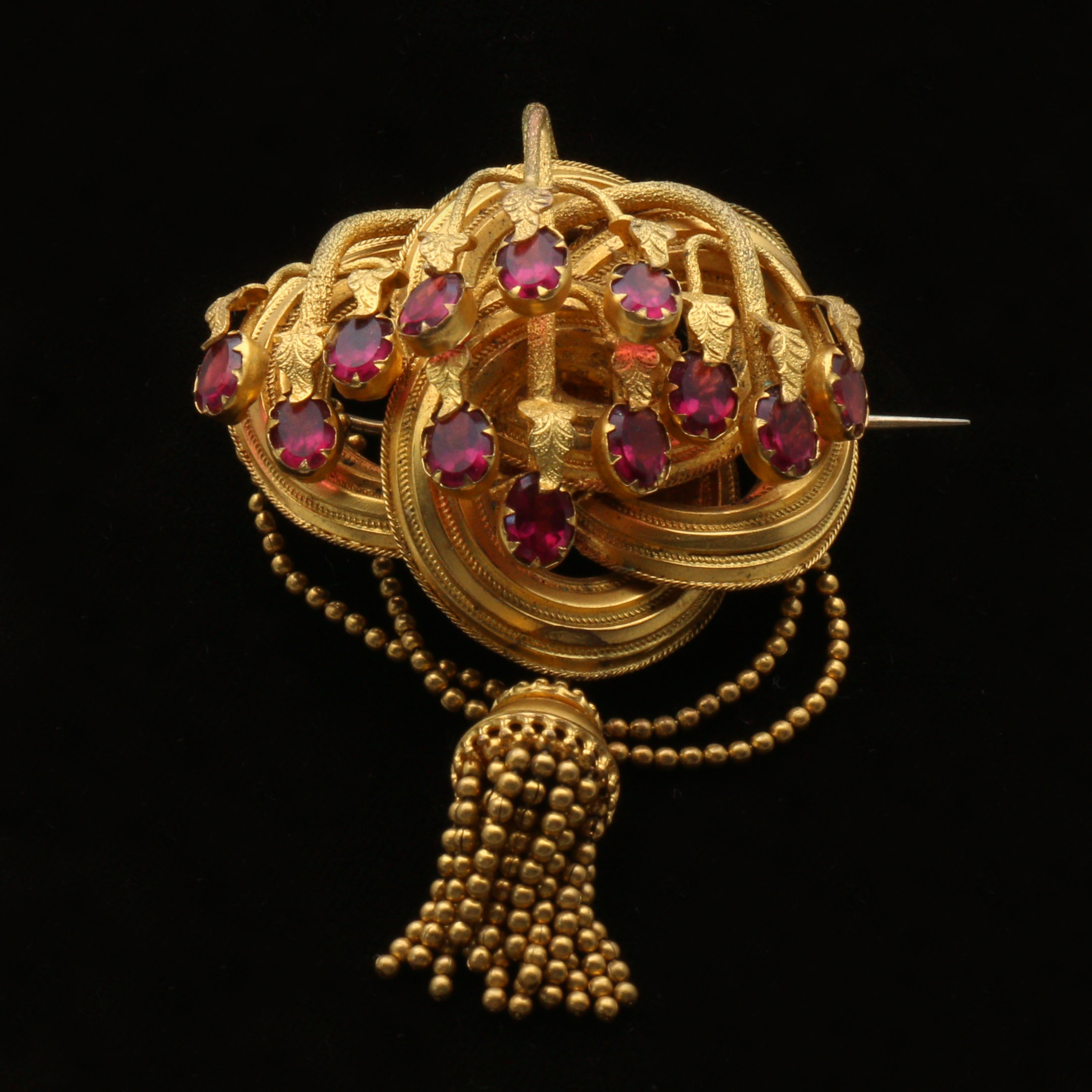
A 19th-century almandine garnet brooch

Almandine occurs rather abundantly in the gem gravels of Sri Lanka, whence it has sometimes been called "Ceylon ruby". When the color inclines to a violet tint, the stone is often called Syriam garnet, a name said to be taken from Syriam, an ancient town of Pegu (now part of Myanmar). Large deposits of fine almandine-garnets were found, some years ago, in the Northern Territory of Australia, and were at first taken for rubies and thus they were known in trade for some time afterwards as Australian rubies.

Almandine is widely distributed. Fine rhombic dodecahedra occur in the schistose rocks of the Zillertal, in Tyrol, and are sometimes cut and polished. An almandine in which the ferrous oxide is replaced partly by magnesia is found at a place once known as Luisenfeld (then German East Africa), now in Tanzania. In the United States there are many localities which yield almandine. Fine crystals of almandine embedded in mica-schist occur near Wrangell in Alaska. The coarse varieties of almandine are often crushed for use as an abrasive agent.

== Cultural significance ==
Connecticut has designated almandine garnet as its state gemstone. A crater on the asteroid 2867 Šteins was named after almandine on 9 May 2012.

== See also ==
- List of minerals
